= Bluck =

Bluck is a surname. Notable people with the surname include:

- Arthur Bluck (1864–1944), Bermudian judge and politician
- Brian Bluck (1935–2015), British geologist
- Duncan Bluck (1927–2015), British businessman
- John Bluck (born 1943), New Zealand Anglican bishop
- Judith Bluck (1936–2011), British artist
- Nigel Bluck (born 1971), New Zealand cinematographer

== See also ==
- Robert Blucke (1897–1988), Royal Air Force officer
- Stephen Blucke (c. 1752–after 1796), Black Loyalist
