= Demographics of Bermuda =

This is a demography of the population of Bermuda including population density, ethnicity, education level, health of the populace, economic status, religious affiliations and other aspects of the population, including changes in the demographic make-up of Bermuda over the centuries of its permanent settlement.

== Population ==
Census population and average annual growth rate
Year	Pop.	±% p.a.
1901	17,535	—
1911	18,994	+0.80%
1921	20,127	+0.58%
1931	27,789	+3.28%
1939	30,814	+1.30%
1950	37,403	+1.78%
1960	42,640	+1.32%
1970	52,976	+2.19%
1980	54,670	+0.32%
1990	58,460	+0.67%
2000	62,098	+0.61%
2010	64,319	+0.35%
2016	63,779	−0.14%

According to the 2016 census the de jure population was 63,779, compared to 64,319 in 2010 and 62,098 in 2000. The estimated mid-year population of 2021 is 64,185 (medium fertility scenario of the 2022 revision of the World Population Prospects).

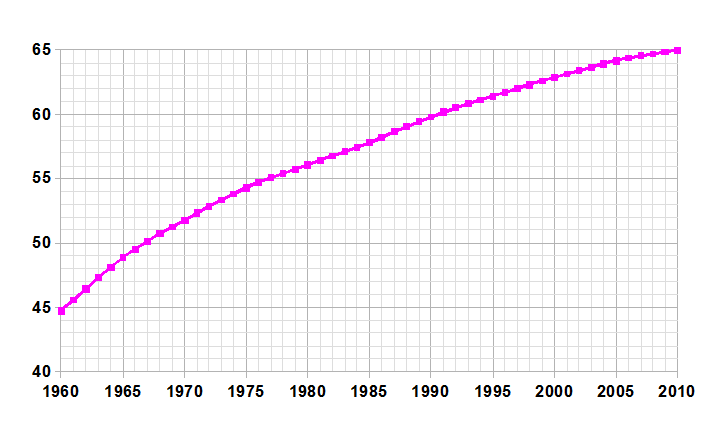
Demographics of Bermuda, Data of FAO, year 2005; Number of inhabitants in thousands.

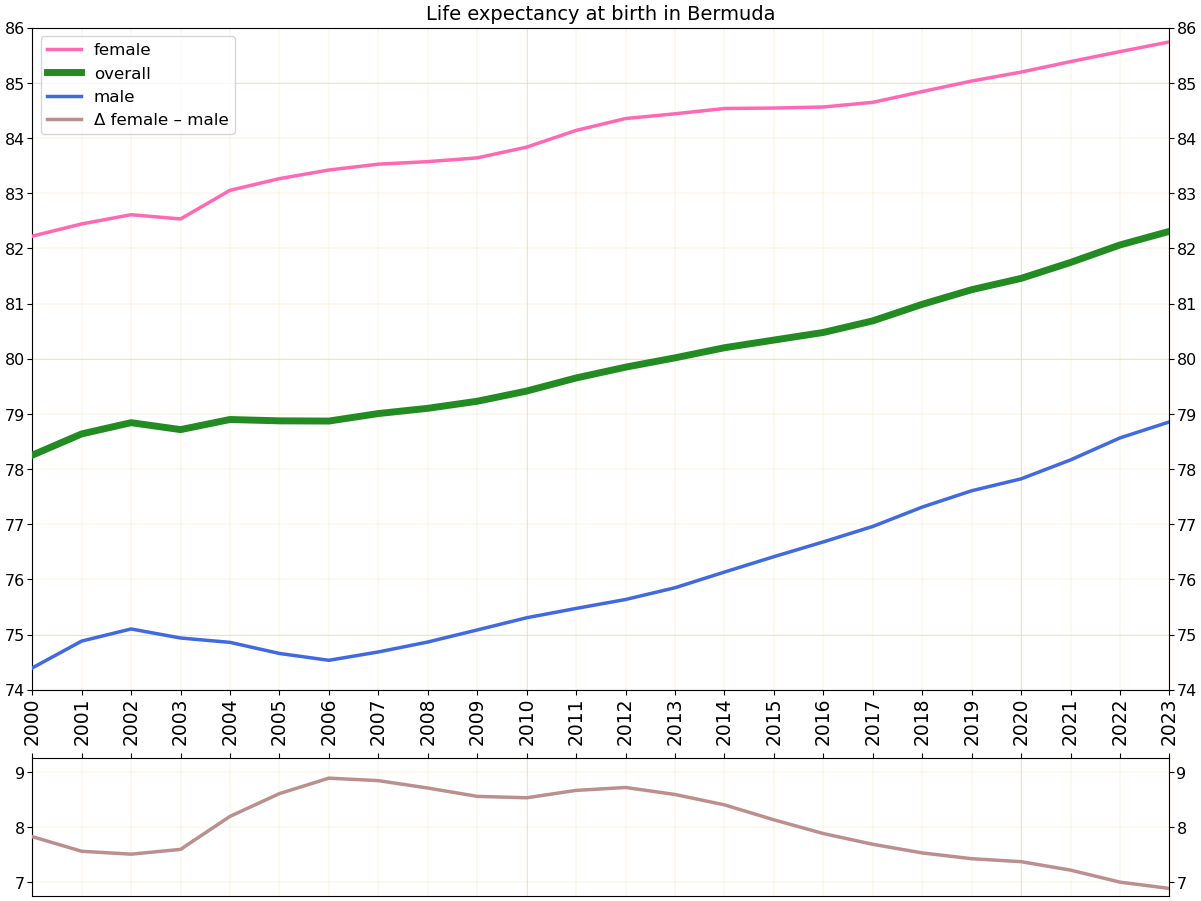
Life expectancy at birth in Bermuda

=== Structure of the population ===
Population by Sex and Age Group (Census 20.V.2016):

Age group	Male	Female	Total	%
Total	30 690	33 089	63 779	100
0–4	1 482	1 511	2 993	4.69
5–9	1 705	1 648	3 353	5.26
10–14	1 650	1 523	3 173	4.97
15–19	1 521	1 629	3 150	4.94
20–24	1 451	1 514	2 965	4.65
25–29	1 659	1 809	3 468	5.44
30–34	2 160	2 282	4 442	6.96
35–39	2 253	2 328	4 581	7.18
40–44	2 437	2 321	4 758	7.46
45–49	2 533	2 472	5 005	7.85
50–54	2 712	2 741	5 453	8.55
55–59	2 505	2 846	5 351	8 .39
60–64	2 045	2 338	4 383	6 .87
65–69	1 584	1 865	3 449	5 .41
70–74	1 208	1 477	2 685	4 .21
75–79	789	1 110	1 899	2 .98
80–84	631	846	1 477	2 .32
85-89	268	501	769	1.21
90-94	88	258	346	0.57
95-99	9	63	72	0.11
100+	0	7	7	0.01
Age group	Male	Female	Total	Percent
0–14	4 837	4 682	9 519	14.92
15–64	21 276	22 280	43 556	68.29
65+	4 577	6 127	10 704	16.78

Population Estimates by Sex and Age Group (01.VII.2021) (Based on the results of the 2016 Population Census.):

Age group	Male	Female	Total	%
Total	30 783	33 272	64 055	100
0–4	1 400	1 381	2 781	4.34
5–9	1 482	1 511	2 993	4.67
10–14	1 701	1 640	3 341	5.22
15–19	1 648	1 524	3 172	4.95
20–24	1 519	1 627	3 146	4.91
25–29	1 438	1 509	2 947	4.60
30–34	1 639	1 799	3 438	5.37
35–39	2 136	2 268	4 404	6.88
40–44	2 235	2 324	4 559	7.12
45–49	2 409	2 306	4 715	7.36
50–54	2 492	2 446	4 938	7.71
55–59	2 639	2 703	5 342	8.34
60–64	2 403	2 797	5 200	8.12
65-69	1 927	2 288	4 215	6.58
70-74	1 450	1 786	3 236	5.05
75-79	1 055	1 366	2 421	3.78
80-84	644	967	1 611	2.52
85+	566	1 030	1 596	2.49
Age group	Male	Female	Total	Percent
0–14	4 583	4 532	9 115	14.23
15–64	20 558	21 303	41 861	65.35
65+	5 642	7 437	13 079	20.42

== Vital statistics ==
	Average population (x 1000)	Live births	Deaths	Natural change	Crude birth rate (per 1000)	Crude death rate (per 1000)	Natural change (per 1000)	TFR
1934	29	842	303	539	28.7	10.3	18.4	
1935	30	727	278	449	24.3	9.3	15.0	
1936	30	748	300	448	24.7	9.9	14.8	
1937	31	728	329	399	23.7	10.7	13.0	
1938	31	769	332	437	24.7	10.7	14.1	
1939	32	729	308	421	23.1	9.8	13.4	
1940	32	739	314	425	23.2	9.9	13.4	
1941	32	765	400	365	23.7	12.4	11.3	
1942	33	827	394	433	25.3	12.0	13.2	
1943	33	920	308	612	27.8	9.3	18.5	
1944	34	879	337	542	26.1	10.0	16.1	
1945	34	886	337	549	25.9	9.9	16.1	
1946	35	878	348	530	25.3	10.0	15.3	
1947	35	1,042	341	701	29.6	9.7	19.9	
1948	36	914	311	603	25.5	8.7	16.8	
1949	37	929	330	599	25.5	9.0	16.4	
1950	37	1,138	352	786	30.7	9.5	21.2	
1951	38	1,046	375	671	27.7	9.9	17.8	
1952	38	1,095	316	779	28.4	8.2	20.2	
1953	39	1,026	333	693	26.1	8.5	17.6	
1954	40	1,102	308	794	27.5	7.7	19.8	
1955	41	1,052	337	715	25.7	8.2	17.5	
1956	41	1,153	334	819	27.8	8.0	19.7	
1957	42	1,087	354	733	25.8	8.4	17.4	
1958	43	1,059	359	700	24.6	8.3	16.3	
1959	44	1,182	374	808	27.0	8.5	18.4	
1960	45	1,208	363	845	27.3	8.2	19.1	
1961	46	1,183	310	873	26.6	7.0	19.7	
1962	46	1,185	334	851	26.6	7.5	19.1	
1963	47	1,215	333	882	26.7	7.3	19.4	
1964	48	1,173	363	810	25.2	7.8	17.4	
1965	49	1,117	358	759	23.5	7.5	16.0	
1966	50	1,004	355	649	20.7	7.3	13.4	
1967	50	980	328	652	19.8	6.6	13.2	
1968	51	984	404	580	19.5	8.0	11.5	
1969	51	934	369	565	18.2	7.2	11.0	
1970	52	1,062	385	677	20.3	7.4	12.9	
1971	52	1,119	428	691	21.3	8.2	13.2	
1972	53	1,008	388	620	19.2	7.4	11.8	
1973	53	919	366	553	17.4	6.9	10.5	
1974	54	894	349	545	16.9	6.6	10.3	
1975	54	837	398	439	15.8	7.5	8.3	
1976	55	856	384	472	16.0	7.2	8.8	
1977	55	809	375	434	15.1	7.0	8.1	
1978	55	745	374	371	13.9	7.0	6.9	
1979	55	791	358	433	14.7	6.7	8.0	
1980	54.870	807	397	410	14.9	7.3	7.6	
1981	55.231	777	457	320	14.3	8.4	5.9	
1982	55.667	805	379	426	14.7	6.9	7.8	
1983	56.194	913	398	515	16.5	7.2	9.3	
1984	56.652	840	396	444	15.1	7.1	8.0	
1985	57.145	914	421	493	16.3	7.5	8.8	
1986	57.619	889	415	474	15.3	7.1	8.1	
1987	58.460	899	438	461	15.3	7.5	7.9	
1988	58.731	935	399	536	15.8	6.8	9.1	
1989	59.066	912	462	450	15.3	7.8	7.6	
1990	59.588	895	445	450	15.0	7.4	7.5	
1991	58.460	901	452	449	15.0	7.5	7.5	
1992	58.731	909	462	447	15.0	7.6	7.4	
1993	59.090	821	480	341	13.5	7.9	5.6	
1994	59.550	851	462	389	13.9	7.6	6.4	
1995	59.942	839	423	416	13.7	6.9	6.8	
1996	60.317	833	414	419	13.5	6.7	6.8	
1997	60.678	849	437	412	13.7	7.0	6.6	
1998	61.210	825	505	320	13.2	8.1	5.1	
1999	61.360	828	427	401	13.2	6.8	6.4	
2000	62.310	838	473	365	13.3	7.5	5.8	2.11
2001	62.699	831	442	389	13.2	7.0	6.2	2.08
2002	63.125	830	404	426	13.1	6.4	6.7	2.08
2003	63.525	834	434	400	13.1	6.8	6.3	2.09
2004	63.955	831	406	425	13.0	6.4	6.6	2.07
2005	64.353	835	437	398	13.1	6.8	6.3	2.09
2006	64.693	798	461	337	12.5	7.2	5.3	2.01
2007	65.084	859	468	391	13.4	7.3	6.1	2.14
2008	65.462	821	443	378	12.8	6.9	5.9	2.03
2009	65.811	819	470	349	12.7	7.3	5.4	2.02
2010	64.444	769	475	294	12.0	7.4	4.6	1.82
2011	64.685	670	429	241	10.6	6.8	3.8	1.65
2012	64.911	648	422	226	10.4	6.8	3.6	1.59
2013	65.091	648	471	177	10.5	7.6	2.9	1.59
2014	65.185	574	478	96	9.3	7.8	1.5	1.42
2015	65.290	583	478	105	8.9	7.3	1.6	1.45
2016	63.826	591	492	91	9.1	7.5	1.6	1.439
2017	63.921	576	481	97	9.2	7.5	1.7	1.400
2018	63.916	530	533	−3	8.3	8.3	0.0	1.346
2019	63.906	525	535	−10	8.2	8.4	−0.2	1.348
2020	63.881	541	566	−25	8.4	8.8	−0.4	1.413
2021	63.648	494	727	−233	7.7	11.3	−3.6	1.321
2022	63.542	479	585	−106	7.5	9.1	−1.6	1.300
2023	63.356	436	622	-186	6.8	9.7	-2.9	1.222
2024		425	602	-177				

== Ethnic groups ==
Ethnic groups of Bermuda (2016)
Ethnic groups	percent
Black	52.3%
White	30.5%
Mixed	9.1%
Asian	4.1%
Other	4.0%
Unspecified	0.1%

=== Historical ===
Year	Population	White	% W	Black	% B
1698	5,862	N/A	61.7	N/A	38.3
1723	8,425	N/A	56.6	N/A	43.4
1731	7,601	N/A	57.3	N/A	42.7
1749	9,270	N/A	57.1	N/A	42.9
1756	11,271	N/A	56.5	N/A	43.5
1764	11,009	N/A	52.8	N/A	47.2
1771	11,155	N/A	55.0	N/A	45.1

=== Current ===
As noted above, only in recent years have Bermudians been given the option to define themselves by more than one race on census returns (and birth registrations), with the 2000 Census giving respondents the options of black, white, Asian, black and white, black and other, white and other, other, and not stated. For a variety of reasons, most Bermudians have continued to identify themselves by a single racial group.

=== One race ===
The 2016 Census results reported roughly 91% of the population self-identifying as only one racial group which was slightly lower than the 2010 Census. The largest group reported Black alone, which decreased slightly from 54% in 2010 to 52% in 2016. The White population remained constant at about 31% of the total population in 2016. The remaining 8% of the 2016 population who reported one race consisted of persons reporting Asian only (4%), and those reporting an other race from the ones listed (4%). The proportions of these respective racial groups were similar to what they were in 2010.

=== More than one race ===
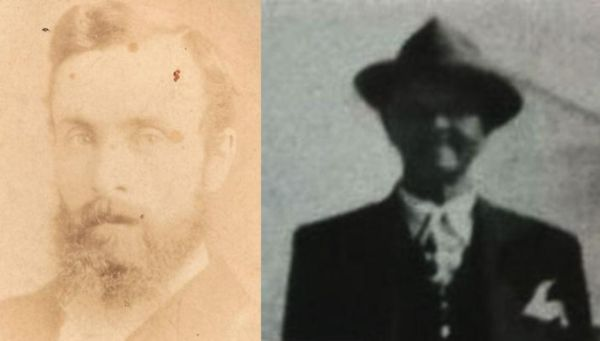
Oliver Constantine Lambert and Osmond Charles Fanshaw Talbot, forebears of the Talbot Brothers. All the six members of the band (in its final line-up) were grandsons of Lambert, via two of his daughters. Five were the sons of Talbot.

Nine percent of the population reported belonging to more than one race in 2016, up from 8% in 2010. The black and white category was the most common, representing 39% of the number reporting multi-racial groups and 4% of the total population of Bermuda. The proportion of 'black and other' increased from 2% to 3% of the total population, making up 35% of the people identifying as mixed race. The remainder were of 'white and other' mixed descent, and remained unchanged at 2% of the total population. The changing racial composition of Bermuda's population is consequence of immigration and an increase of interracial marriage.

== Languages ==
The predominant language on Bermuda is Bermudian English. It exhibits characteristics of British, West Indian, and American English. Perhaps most interesting is its closeness to acrolectal English compared to varieties in the West Indies.

British English spellings and conventions are used in print media and formal written communications.

Portuguese is also spoken in Bermuda; this is owing to immigration from Portugal, particularly from the Azores, as well as from Madeira and the Cape Verde Islands.

== Religion ==
Religion of Bermuda (2010)
Religion	percent
Protestant	46.2%
None	23.7%
Anglican	15.8%
Roman Catholic	14.5%
Other Christian	9.1%
African Methodist Episcopal	8.6%
Seventh-day Adventist	6.7%
Other	3.9%
Pentecostal	3.5%
Other Protestant	2.0%
Methodist	2.7%
Presbyterian	2.09%
Jehovah's Witness	1.3%
Church of God	1.6%
Baptist	1.2%
Brethren	1.0%
Salvation Army	1.1%
Islam	1%

During the intercensal period, the distribution of persons across the various religious affiliations shifted but remained generally widespread. All religious groups experienced declines in their followings with the exception of Roman Catholics, Seventh-Day Adventists and non-denominational groups. Nearly one fifth or 20% of the population claimed no religious affiliation in 2010 compared with a 14% share in 2000. Although the number of Roman Catholics increased to 9,340 persons, its share remained constant at 15% compared to 2000. Over the ten-year period, nondenominational congregations increased a strong 33% while the Seventh-Day Adventist following rose 6%.

Religion in Bermuda (2010)
1. Protestant (46.2%)
2. Roman Catholic (14.5%)
3. Other Christian (9.10%)
4. Unaffiliated (17.8%)
5. Other religion (12.4%)

== Historical census statistics ==
The population of Bermuda on 1 January 1699 was 5,862, including 3,615 white (with 724 men able to bear arms) and 2,247 coloured (with 529 men able to bear arms).

The population of Bermuda on 17 April 1721 was listed as 8,364, composed of: "Totals:—Men on the Muster roll, 1,078; men otherwise, 91; Women, 1,596; boys, 1,072; girls, 1,013. Blacks; Men, 817, women 965; boys 880; girls, 852."

The population of Bermuda in 1727 was 8,347, and included 4,470 white (910 men; 1,261 boys; 1,168 women; 1,131 girls) and 3,877 coloured (787 men; 1,158 boys; 945 women; 987 girls).

The population of Bermuda in 1783 was 10,381, and included 5,462 white (1,076 males under 15; 1,325 males over 15; 3,061 females) and 4,919 coloured (1,153 males under 15; 1,193 males over 15; 2,573 females).

By 18 November 1811, the permanent population of Bermuda was 10,180, including 5,425 coloured and 4,755 white:

== Robert Kennedy's population figures, 1812 ==
A return of the white and coloured population of the Bermuda Islands this 18th day of November 1811 (Source: Robert Kennedy, (Colonial) Secretary's Office, 4 February 1812)
Whites					Enslaved Coloured					Free Coloured					Whites		Enslaved Coloured		Free Coloured		Whites	Enslaved Coloured	Free Coloured	White and Coloured Population
Males under 16	Males above 16	Females under 16	Females above 16	Absent	Males under 16	Males above 16	Females under 16	Females above 16	Absent	Males under 16	Males above 16	Females under 16	Females above 16	Absent	Males	Females	Males	Females	Males	Females	Total male and female	Total male and female	Total male and female	Grand Total
699	893	745	2,137	361	961	1,082	1,012	1,408	673	76	69	105	190	17	1,728	2,883	2,225	2,480	151	295	4,755	4,974	451	10,180

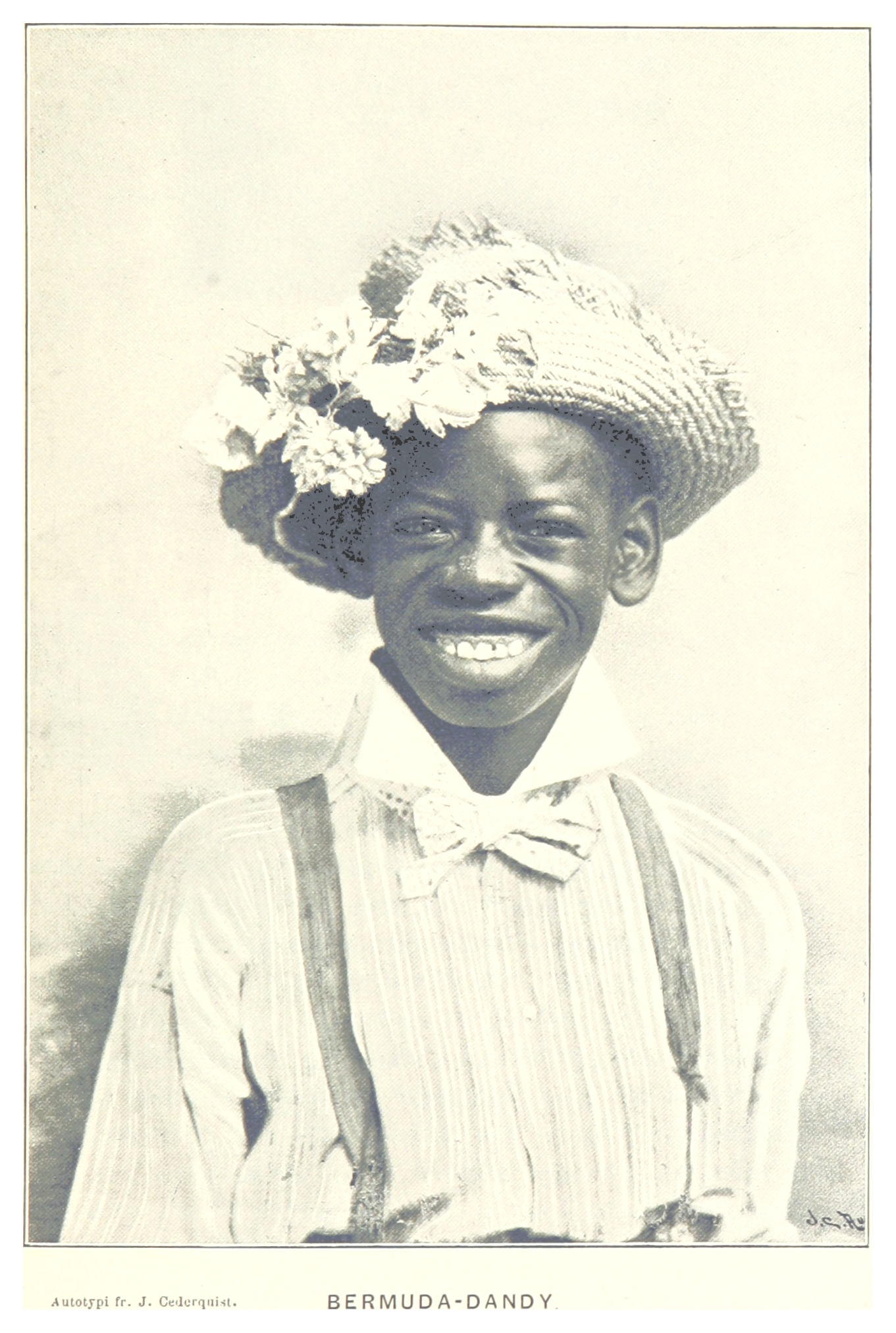
Dandy on Bermuda, 1895

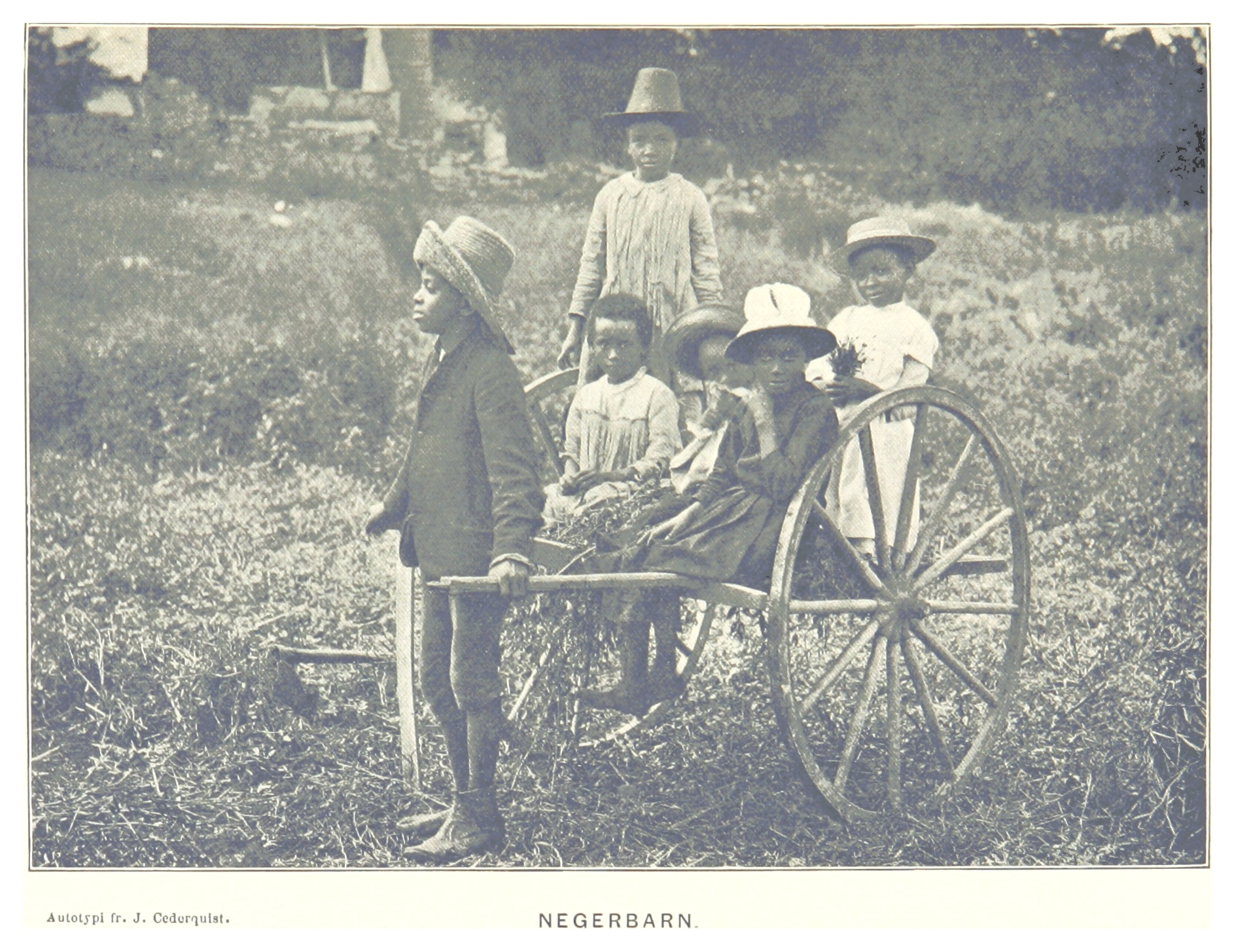
Black children on Bermuda, 1895

By 1831, the permanent population of Bermuda' (not including the thousands of Royal Navy sailors and marines or British Army and Board of Ordnance soldiers based in Bermuda, or the 1,500 convicts shipped from Britain and Ireland to labour at the Royal Naval Dockyard) was 11,250, including 7,330 white and free coloured, and 3,920 enslaved (coloured).

== 1843 census ==
Population of Bermuda (Census of 1843)
	White		Coloured		
Parish	Males	Females	Males	Females	TOTAL
St. George's	260	375	394	578	1,607
Hamilton	152	209	303	327	991
Smith's	81	122	113	126	442
Devonshire	120	208	173	224	729
Pembroke	422	572	444	641	2,079
Paget	176	276	189	231	867
Warwick	170	267	201	256	895
Southampton	125	232	231	300	888
Sandys	213	354	414	451	1,432
GRAND TOTAL					9,930

Population of Bermuda (Census of 1851)
	White		Coloured		
Parish	Males	Females	Males	Females	TOTAL
St. George's	365	436	431	659	1,891
Hamilton	177	200	330	387	1,094
Smith's	103	135	128	148	514
Devonshire	129	217	208	230	784
Pembroke	431	606	495	703	2,235
Paget	195	293	233	347	1,038
Warwick	180	270	241	283	983
Southampton	145	218	246	308	917
Sandys	231	329	520	556	1,636
GRAND TOTAL					11,092

== 1861–1939 Censuses ==
Population of Bermuda (data from Censuses 1871–1939)
	Coloured			Portuguese			White (* Includes Portuguese)					
Year	Females	Males	Subtotal	Females	Males	Subtotal	Females	Males	Subtotal	All Females	All Males	TOTAL
1861	3,875	2,951	6,826	–	–	–	2,666*	1,958*	4,624*	6,541	4,909	11,450
1871	4,112	3,284	7,376	–	–	–	2,607*	2,118*	4,725*	6,719	5,402	12,101
1891	5,026	4,297	9,323	–	–	–	2,951*	2,739*	5,690*	7,977	7,036	15,013
1911	6,408	5,895	12,303	–	–	–	3,516*	3,175*	6,691*	9,924	9,070	
1931			16,436	–	–	–			11,353*			27,789 gross
1939 Emergency	9,894	9,424	19,318	1,101	1,521	2,622	4,606	4,253	8,859	15,601	15,213	30,814 excluding regular forces and HMD establishment 35,423 gross

== Terminology ==
The term coloured was generally used in preference to black, with anyone who was of wholly European ancestry (at least Northern European) defined as white, leaving everyone else as coloured. This included the multi-racial descendants of the previous minority demographic groups (Black, Irish and Native American) that had quickly blended together, along with some part of the White Anglo-Saxon Protestant majority, as well as the occasional Jew, Persian, East Asian or other non-White and non-Black Bermudian.

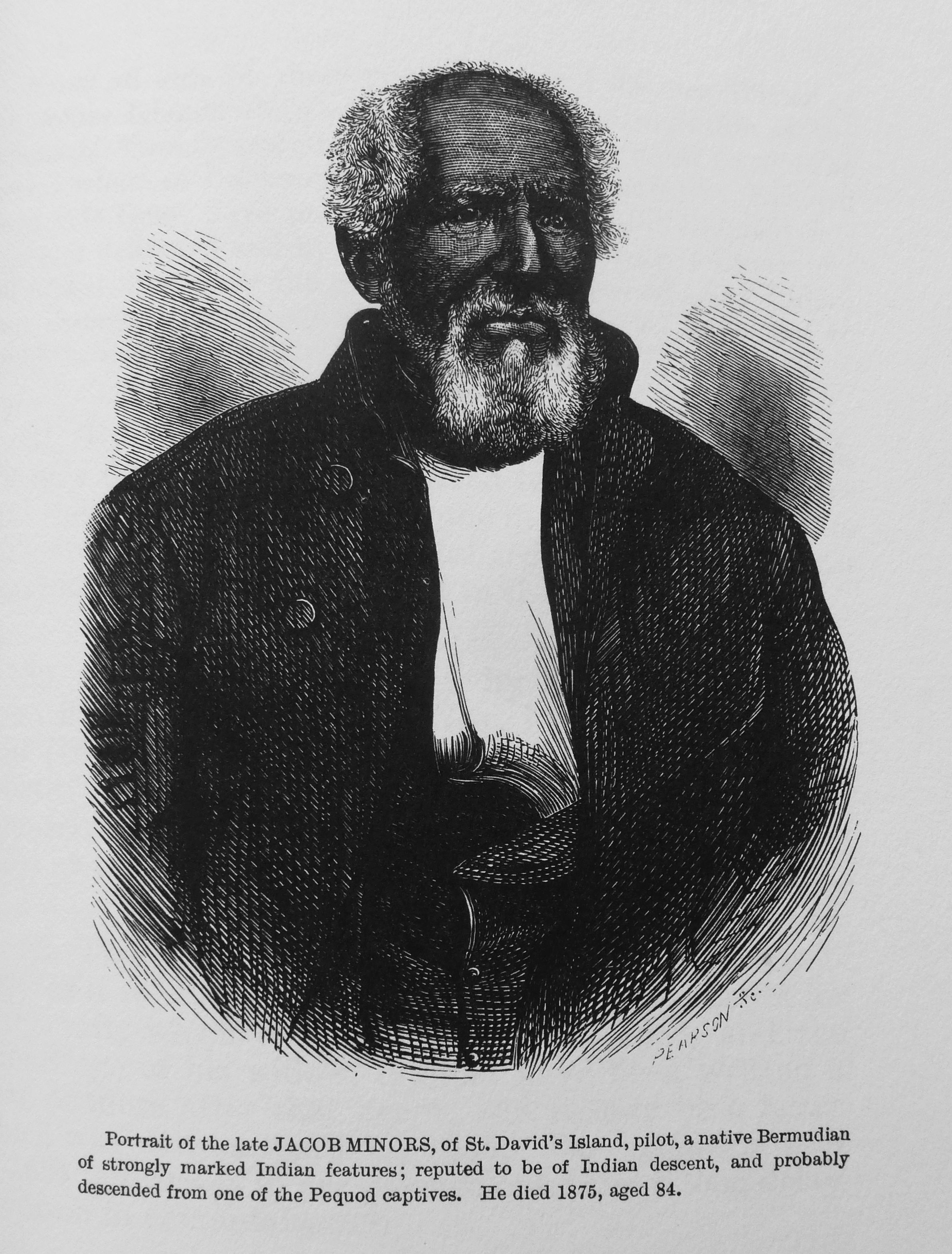
Jacob Minors (1791–1875) of St. David's Island, St. George's Parish, Bermuda

It was largely by this method (mixed-race Bermudians being added to the number of Blacks, rather than added to the number of Whites or being defined as a separate demographic group) that Coloured (subsequently redefined after the 1960s as Black) Bermudians came to outnumber White Bermudians by the end of the 18th century, despite starting off at a numerical disadvantage, and despite low Black immigration prior to the latter 19th century. The scale of White relative to Black emigration in the 17th and 18th centuries also doubtlessly played a factor. Roughly 10,000 Bermudians are estimated to have emigrated, primarily to the North American continental colonies (particularly: Virginia; Carolina Colony, which later became South Carolina and North Carolina; Georgia; and Florida) before United States independence in 1783. This included white Bermudians from every level of society, but particularly poorer, landless ones as Bermuda's high birth rate produced population growth that could not be sustained without emigration. Many free black Bermudians also emigrated, but this was less likely to be voluntary given that they would be leaving families behind and generally faced poorer prospects outside of Bermuda (although white fear of the growing number of blacks did result in free blacks being coerced to emigrate, though how many did is not recorded). Enslaved coloured Bermudians also preferred not to emigrate, but had little choice when slaveholders emigrated with them.

From the 1840s, immigration from Portuguese Atlantic islands saw Bermudians generally divided into coloured, white, and Portuguese.

== History ==
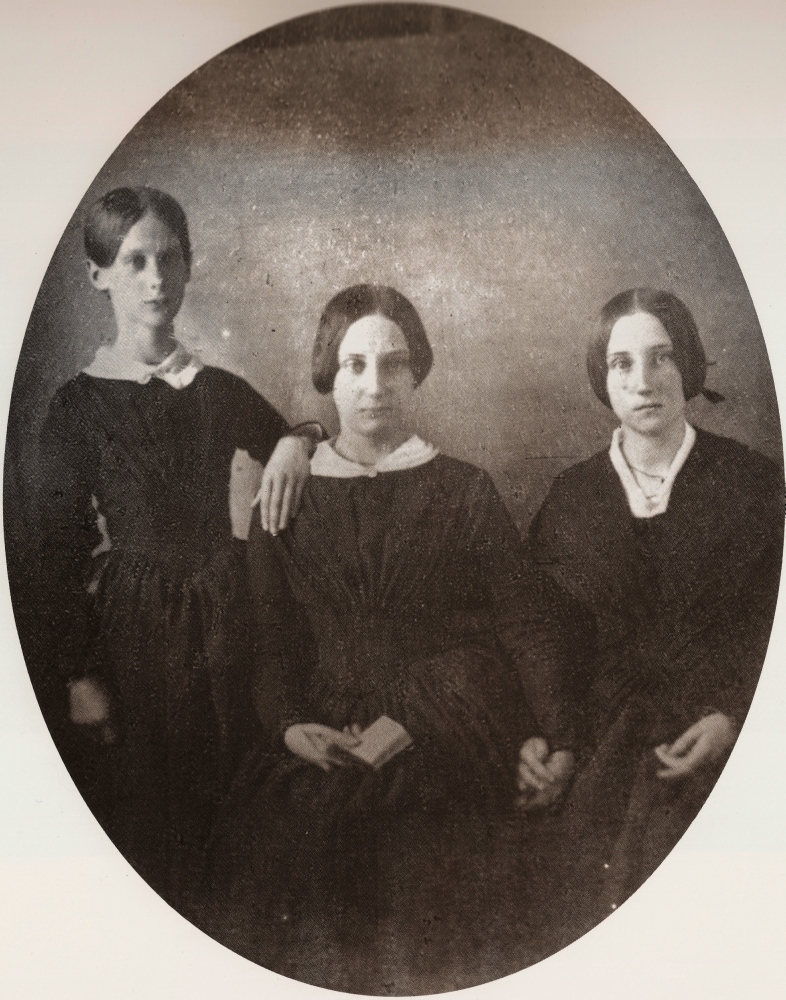
Bermudian sisters Rosalie, Helen and Ellesif Darrell in 1846

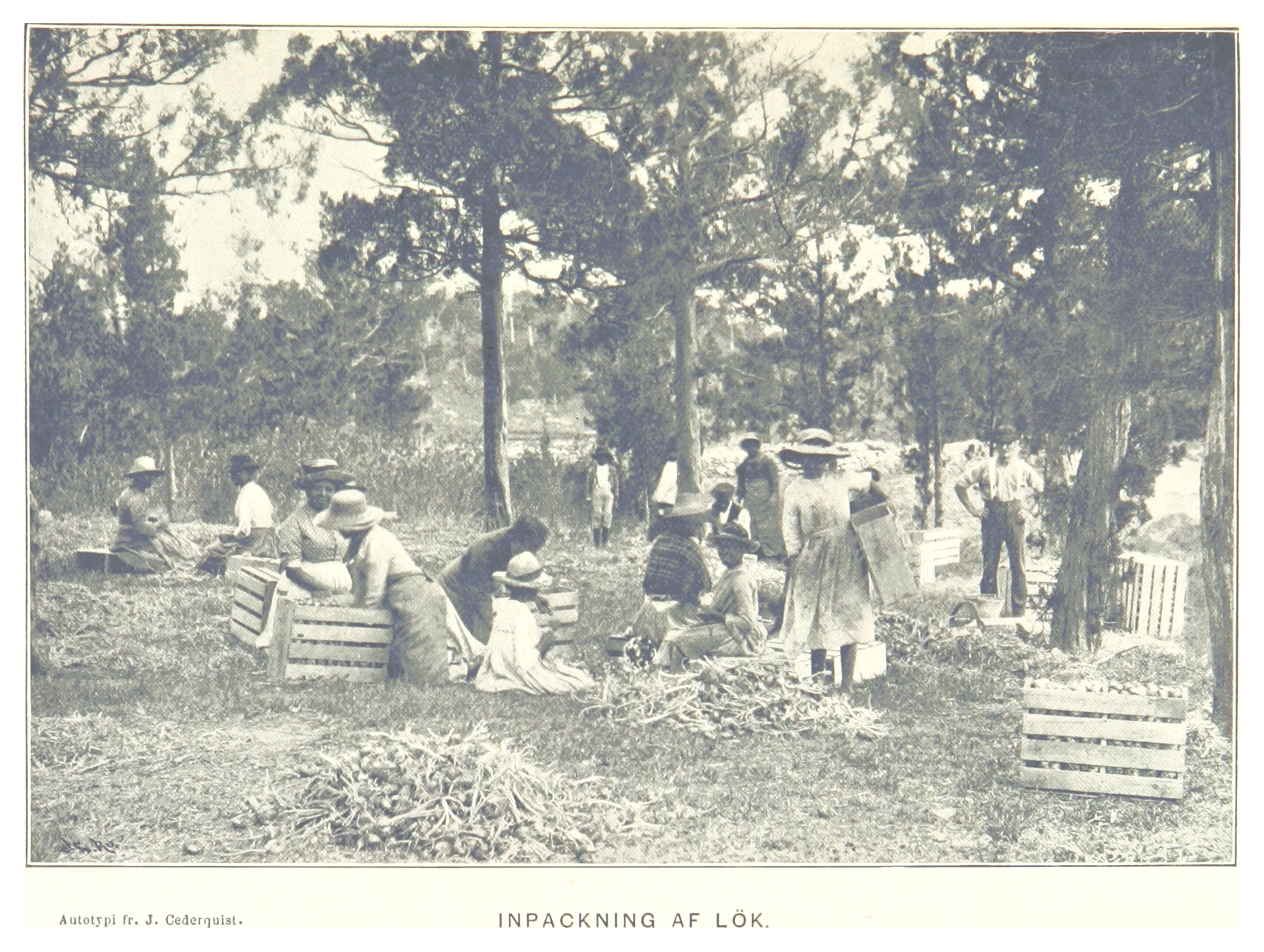
Black labourers packing onions on Bermuda, 1895. As such work was stigmatised amongst Bermudians, much of it was carried out by families brought in from Portuguese Atlantic islands, the British West Indies, and even from Baltic countries

From settlement until the 19th century, the largest demographic group remained what in the United States is referred to as white-Anglo (or white Anglo-Saxon Protestant). The reason Black slaves did not quickly come to outnumber Whites, as was the case in continental and West Indian colonies at that time (such as Carolina Colony and Barbados), was that Bermuda's 17th-century agricultural industry continued to rely on indentured servants, mostly from England, until 1684, thanks to it remaining a company colony (with poor would-be settlers contracting to provide a fixed number of years' labour in exchange for the cost of transport). Spanish-speaking Blacks began to immigrate in numbers from the West Indies as indentured servants in the mid-17th century, but White fears at their growing numbers led to their terms of indenture being raised from seven years, as with Whites, to 99 years. Throughout the next two centuries, frequent efforts were made to lower the Black population.

Free Blacks, who were the majority of Black Bermudians in the 17th century, were threatened with enslavement as an attempt to encourage their emigration, and slave owners were encouraged to export enslaved Blacks whenever a war loomed, as they were portrayed as unnecessary bellies to feed during times of shortage (even before abandoning agriculture for maritime activities in 1684, Bermuda had become reliant on food imports).

In addition to free and enslaved Blacks, 17th-century Bermuda had large minorities of Irish indentured servants and Native American slaves, as well as a smaller number of Scots, all forced to leave their homelands and shipped to Bermuda. Native Americans sold into chattel slavery in Bermuda were brought from various parts of North America, including Mexico, but most particularly from the Algonquian areas of the Atlantic seaboard, from which natives were subjected to genocide by the English; most famously following the Pequot War and Metacomet's War. The Irish and Scots are usually described as prisoners-of-war, which was certainly true of the Scots. The Irish shipped to Bermuda following the Cromwellian conquest of Ireland included both prisoners-of-war and civilians of either sex ethnically cleansed from lands slated for resettlement by Protestants from Britain, including Cromwell's soldiers who were to be paid with Irish land. In Bermuda they were sold into indentured servitude. The Scots and the Irish were ostracised by the white English population, who were particularly fearful of the Irish, who plotted rebellions with Black slaves, and intermarried with the Blacks and Native Americans. The majority white-Anglo population, or at least its elites, became alarmed very early at the increasing numbers of Irish and non-whites, most of whom were presumed to be clinging to Catholicism (recusancy was a crime in Bermuda, as it was in England).

Despite the banning of the importation of any more Irish after they were perceived to be the leaders of a foiled 1661 uprising intended to be carried out in concert with black slaves, the passing of a law against miscegenation in 1663, the first of a succession of attempts to force free blacks to emigrate in 1656 (in response to an uprising by enslaved blacks), and frequent encouragement of the owners of black slaves to export them, by the 18th century the merging of the various minority groups, along with some of the white-Anglos, had resulted in a new demographic group, "coloured" (which term, in Bermuda, referred to anyone not wholly of European ancestry) Bermudians, who gained a slight majority by the 19th century.

Enslaved Black Bermudians, by comparison, had little choice but to go where they were taken, and more affluent white Bermudians who settled on the continent or elsewhere often brought slaves with them, as was the case with Denmark Vesey (born in the West Indies, who was enslaved for years to a Bermudian who then resettled with him in South Carolina). Given the choice, enslaved black Bermudians consequently generally chose not to emigrate, even when it would have meant freedom. Abandoning their families in Bermuda was too great a step. Enslaved adult black Bermudian men, like white Bermudian men, were generally sailors and or shipwrights, and hired themselves out as did free men, or were hired out, with their earnings usually divided between themselves and the slave masters, who used the enslaved man's family bonds to Bermuda to control him; allowing slaves to carry out a small degree of control over their economic life and to accumulate meager savings also worked to discourage slaves from escaping overseas, where they might find freedom, but also likely face poverty and social exclusion.

By example, in 1828 the ship Lavinia stopped in Bermuda on a voyage from Trinidad to Belfast, Ireland, and signed on twelve enslaved Bermudian sailors as crew. On reaching Belfast, where slavery was illegal, in September, eleven of the enslaved Bermudians were brought before a magistrate with members of the Anti-Slavery Society in attendance after a member of the Society of Friends had reported their presence (the twelfth, Thomas Albouy, failed to appear as he was on watch duty aboard the Lavinia and unwilling to abandon his post). Each man was asked individually whether he wished to remain in Ireland as a free man. Their replies were:

- Benjamin Alick (written Alik): "I wish to go back to my family and friends"
- Richard Place: "I wish to return to my mother"
- Francis Ramio: "I wish to return to my wife"
- Joseph Varman: wished to return
- James Lambert: wished to return
- Thomas Williams: wished to return to his wife and child
- Joshua Edwards: wished to remain free in Ireland
- Robert Edwards: wished to remain free in Ireland
- Joseph Rollin: wished to remain free in Ireland
- John Stowe (written Stow): "I wish to go back to my family"
- George Bassett: "I am much obliged to the gentlemen for their offer of freedom, but I wish to return to my friends"

The Royal Gazette, on 13 December 1926, quoted a contemporary Irish newspaper as having described the enslaved Bermudians as they spoke English very well, and were stout, healthy men, clean and well dressed. They told the magistrate that in Bermuda their employment was not arduous, they did very little work on the Sabbath day, and they all attended a place of worship. They were usually hired out by their masters, who got two-thirds of their wage and they got the other third. They knew before they left Bermuda that they might be freed in Great Britain, but they had no complaint to make of their condition and, when they spoke of returning to their families, they indicated "the finest emotions and susceptibilities of affection".

Other contributing factors to the changing ratio of the coloured to white population during the 17th and 18th centuries included the greater mortality of Whites from disease in the late 17th century, and patriarchal property laws that transferred a woman's property to her husband upon her marriage. This, combined with the shortage of white males due to the steady outflow of marriageable white sailors from Bermuda who settled abroad or were lost at sea, resulted in a sizeable contingent of aging and childless white unwed women for which Bermuda was noted well into the 20th century.

Considerable written material (letters, official reports, petitions, et cetera, and, from 1783, the content of Bermudian newspapers) that survives in archives and museums gives insight into the social, economic and political life of Bermuda between its settlement in the 17th century and the mid-19th century. Most of the Bermudians mentioned by name in these documents, however, tend to have been the more prominent white males. The views expressed about Bermudians, certainly in official correspondence from governors, naval and military officers, and other representatives of the imperial government, were often negative, resulting from the antagonistic relationship with Bermuda's native elites, whose economic interests often were not aligned with imperial interests (this was not necessarily always the case for poorer whites and free or enslaved coloured Bermudians). After the American War of Independence, there was deep distrust of Bermuda's local government and the merchant class that dominated it due to the prominent Bermudians who had schemed with the continental rebels, supplying them with ships and gunpowder, and continuing to trade with them in violation of the law. Although it was observed that enslaved coloured Bermudians were generally less likely to revolt than slaves in other colonies, the experience of various slave revolts in other British colonies during the preceding decades and the then ongoing uprising of slaves in Saint Domingue (now Haiti) during the French Revolution, the facts of which it was believed that well-travelled enslaved Bermudian sailors were particularly well-acquainted with and would be inspired by, combined with the relative freedom of movement and association of Bermuda's slaves, meant they were seen as a potential threat by officers of the British Government. As it was also perceived that slaves were not vital to the colony as slave-ownership was common among less well-to-do white households in which much of the work performed by slaves should, and elsewhere would, have been carried out by the more common class of whites themselves (this may have been true of household slaves, who acted as servants and tended small adjacent plots of vegetables grown for the subsistence of the household, which was virtually the only agriculture carried out in Bermuda between 1684 and the 1840s, but most able-bodied enslaved men were actually engaged in maritime activities that were essential to Bermuda's economic survival), it was also felt that the threat of a slave revolt was an unnecessary one.

This was not the only instance where the assumptions of officers of the British government, who were usually aristocrats or from the most privileged class of commoners, coloured their views of Bermudians and Bermudian society. A frequent comment made of Bermudians in the late 18th and early 19th century was that they were lazy or indolent. Most frequently cited in evidence of this was the apparent failure of Bermudians to fell the cedar forest cloaking the archipelago in order to adopt any manner of intensive agriculture. Numerous governors attempted to encourage agriculture, with little success due partly to the stigma in Bermuda against working the land. What was not obvious to many outside observers was Bermuda's shortage of wood, specifically Bermuda cedar, upon which its maritime economy relied. Bermuda's shipbuilders struggled not to exhaust this precious resource, and land-owning Bermudians counted cedars on their property as wealth which accrued interest over decades as the trees grew, and the remaining forest was consequently protected.

The voices of Bermudians themselves, at least of the poorer ones, the enslaved, and the women, were not generally recorded in the documents that were handed down by those generations.

Bermuda was a popular subject for playwrights, authors and poets in England during the early years of its colonisation, given the drama of its unintended settlement through the wreck of the Sea Venture and its being by far the more successful of the Virginia Company's two settlements until the 1620s. However, as Virginia developed and new colonies were established in the West Indies, Bermuda slipped from the view of writers and the public in England (nearly a century after its settlement, Bermuda, along with the rest of the Kingdom of England, united with the Kingdom of Scotland to become the Kingdom of Great Britain). Although rarely mentioned in histories or other reference books between the latter 17th century and the 19th century, Bermuda's designation as an Imperial fortress, Britain's primary naval and military base in the region of North America and the West Indies following US independence, and the emergence of the tourism industry in the latter 19th century, brought many erudite visitors and short-term residents, some already published authors, and more comprehensive ethnographic information on the people of Bermuda was included in many subsequently published recollections, travel guides, and magazine articles, such as the book BERMUDA; A COLONY, A FORTRESS AND A PRISON; OR, Eighteen Months in the Somers Islands, published anonymously (the author, Ferdinand Whittingham, was identified only as A FIELD OFFICER who had served in the Bermuda Garrison) in 1857, though the authors' observations often gave more reliable insight into the assumptions and nature of their own societies and classes.

In 1828, Purser Richard Otter of the Royal Navy published Sketches of Bermuda, or Somers' Islands, a description of Bermuda based on his own observations while serving there, assigned to the North America and West Indies Station. Of his reasons for writing the account, he wrote in the preface:

The obscurity in which the Bermuda's, or Somers' Islands, have remained in point of historical facts, since they were first peopled, and my fruitless endeavours to gain information respecting that Colony, on my appointment to a public situation there, four years ago, determined me to glean all I could during a residence of that period.

I am free to confess that I had many motives in collecting all I could on a place that at first sight interested me in no trifling degree.

The friendly hospitality of the men, the mild and gentle demeanour of the women, that needed not a frown to awe the libertine to respect them, the curiosity natural to a citizen of the world, the wish to become useful to my country, and last, though not least, a desire to make my researches as advantageous as possible to my numerous family, were irresistible inducements, first to collect all the materials I could, and now to trust my feelings and my fate to a generous public.

Of Bermuda's importance to the British Empire, he observed:

The possession of Bermuda, as the key of all our Western Colonies, is of the first importance to England, for if a foe of any maritime strength had possession of it, our trade would be exposed to much annoyance, if not total destruction.

Of the prevailing opinion of Bermudians as expressed by other Imperial government officials who had served there, and of his own opinion of Bermudians, he wrote:

It has become too much the fashion amongst the officers of the various branches of the public service to ridicule the Bermudians, after partaking of their hospitality, but the latter are not inferior in any particular to the people of the Mother country; the women are as chaste and as fair, and the men as clever, as friendly, and as hospitable too in proportion to their relative means. It is true, that owing to the relaxation consequent to a warm climate, added, to the expensiveness of apparel, the ladies do not find it convenient to be at home at all times to receive idle visitors, but at the Governor's parties, public balls, and amateur plays, they are neatly dressed, and each lady may claim the merit of being her own dressmaker. The men of business are shrewd and well-informed, many of them have acquired their knowledge of trade in America, the mode of that country being better suited to the limited traffic of Bermuda, than the broad scale upon which the mercandize of England is conducted.

The rich history of Bermudians and Bermuda, and the important roles they had played in almost every Imperial endeavour of England and Britain in the Americas and beyond during the 17th and 18th centuries, eluded Otter, who briefly summarised the first few years of settlement before recording:

The Archives of the Colony present nothing worthy of notice after this period, and tradition hands down no more than the quarrels between a long succession of Governors and the people.

And:

...when one of the first writers of the age declared, after several years residence at Bermuda, that its annals afforded nothing upon which a history could be founded, it would be great presumption in a man who has spent his life at sea to attempt swelling out those annals into a large volume.

On the subject of contemporary Bermudians, he wrote:

...the Bermudians have neither vinegar nor cayenne in their composition, and a stranger who does not meet kind treatment from them has to blame himself only...

...The population of Bermuda is between nine and ten thousand souls, (if negroes have souls, and one is apt to be of uncle Toby's opinion, that "it would be putting one sadly over the head of another if they had not,") something more than half of this number are whites of whom nearly two thirds are females. This may be accounted for in part from the men, who are of an enterprising spirit, being often obliged to risk their lives in crazy little vessels, badly manned and indifferently navigated, to the West Indies and different parts of America, in search of a field for industry in a commercial line, which their little Colony does not afford.

The attachment of the women does not die with their husbands; there are many instances where a lady, widowed in the prime of youth, rejects every offer of conjugal consolation, however advantageous, during the rest of her life.

The negro population of Bermuda (all natives) is distressing to their owners, as well as to the Colony in general, and the prohibition of sending them to the West India Islands falls heavily on them, inasmuch as the owners are obliged to have recourse to America for live stock, flour, India corn, and corn meal for their maintenance; added to which, the arrival of seven hundred convicts for the public works, threw back upon their (in several instances) helpless owners, many of this ill-fated race of our species.

Many of the females of Bermuda have no other property than a place to live in and a few slaves, left them by their deceased relatives. There being little field work, the black children being cherished as property, are brought up in the house of their mothers' owners, and become playmates to the owners' children; this creates an attachment that lasts through life.

An instance of this occurred not long ago. A lady complained to a magistrate of a negro man having struck a negress, (a fellow slave;) the case having been fully proved, the magistrate ordered the delinquent to be punished, when the mistress exclaimed in agony, "what! flog my poor Jem, who has been brought up from infancy with me," and fainted. The female slave joined her supplications to the silent but powerful eloquence of the mistress, and Jem of course had his punishment remitted.

He also wrote at length about the industry, economy and subsistence strategies of Bermuda, showing the usual attitude of Imperial officials to Bermudians perceived failure to clear forest to turn land over to commercial agriculture:

...Of the twelve thousand acres which Bermuda is said to contain, two thousand might be brought into cultivation if there was less veneration for cedar trees, and a trifling exertion made to drain or embank the marshes, whereas at present there are not two hundred acres disturbed by the spade or the plough; indeed there is but one plough in the Colony, and that belongs to an Englishman named Winsor, who has proved what could be made of ground apparently barren...

...The facility of receiving supplies from America, has too long made the Bermudians regardless of internal resources; and the produce of the soil, even with the quick succession and perpetual vegetation, will not keep pace with the active mind of a man accustomed from boyhood to the more quick returns of commercial speculations...

...Almost all the occupiers of land sow a small quantity of barley, but in getting in their harvest they seem to scorn the copying system; neither scythe nor sickle are in use, but an old woman (generally a black) is furnished with a basket, and a pair of scissors, of equal standing in the family with herself: thus equipped, she proceeds to cut off the ears of Barley, and in the course of time she has the satisfaction to see a whole rood of barley reduced to headless straw, which is soon converted into bonnets. Europeans are highly amused on witnessing, this novel mode of farming. Their method of preparing the barley is by boiling it into a thick jelly, which they call barley broth, having first deprived it of its husks in a mortar...

...The great variety and abundance of fish is considered by some the reverse of a blessing, as it draws off the attention of the lower orders from the cultivation of the soil. The better sort of people, and a few provident fishermen, have ponds which they stock in summer for winter supply, but the lower order of whites are the most miserable of the human creation. When they catch fish, they reserve as much as will sustain nature as long as the price of what they sell will produce rum enough to keep them in a state of intoxication, using neither bread nor vegetables; their wives and children live on the bounty of the ladies of their respective neighbourhoods, who are without exception kind-hearted and charitable. These fishermen live in hovels or old ruins, and are little encumbered with cloathing...

...Bermuda, until the restriction of trade in 1826, derived all its supplies of oxen and sheep from the United States of America, but since that period the Bermudians have in part imitated the mode used by the Americans in naturalizing British subjects, and without the process of rocking the ox in a cradle, naturalize them in droves by driving them over the boundary into our North American dominions, and thence shipping them for our insulated Colonies.

The American Farmer has no other mart for the disposal of his surplus produce but our Colonies in the Western Archipelago, hence the restriction in commerce must press more heavily on the American citizens than on our Colonists; but this mode of supply is attended with greater expence, inasmuch as the Americans are cheaper carriers than the English.

Bermuda produces fresh butter and milk sufficient to meet the demand for those articles, but they do not rear more cattle than what are merely necessary to keep up their stock, killing the calves when about two months old. Except with a few who can afford to enclose their grounds, the cattle of Bermuda are tethered on the pasture; even hogs and goats can range no farther than the length of their strings, the Bermudians being very jealous of trespassers. They rear but few sheep, there being scarcely any enclosure in the country capable of restraining the roving propensity of these animals. The country is very productive in the propagation of every species of domestic poultry except geese, which do not thrive here, although several have been introduced at various times from America. A few wild geese are sometimes driven thither in the winter gales...

...It is a mistaken notion that Bermuda cannot produce sufficient of all the necessaries of life to support its population, even with its redundancy of blacks, if proper exertions were made to cultivate the soil, but it may be repeated that with half its present number of negroes the Colony would be more prosperous...

Susette Harriet Lloyd travelled to Bermuda in company with the Church of England's Archdeacon of Bermuda Aubrey Spencer, Mrs Spencer, and Ella, Miss Parker, Major and Mrs Hutchison and their daughter, the Reverend Robert Whitehead, Lieutenant Thompson of the 74th Regiment of Foot, and Lieutenant Young, aboard HMS Wanderer, which was delivering a military detachment from England to the Bermuda Garrison. Lloyd's visit to Bermuda lasted two years, and her Sketches of Bermuda (a collection of letters she had written en route to, and during her stay in, Bermuda, and dedicated to Archdeacon Spencer) was published in 1835, immediately following the abolition of slavery in Bermuda and the remainder of the British Empire in 1834 (Bermuda elected to end slavery immediately, becoming the first colony to do so, though all other British colonies except for Antigua availed themselves of an allowance made by the Imperial government enabling them to phase slavery out gradually). Lloyd's book gives a rare contemporary account of Bermudian society immediately prior to the abolition of slavery.

Of white Bermudians, her observations included:

The last assertion, that 'the women are without colour,' I cannot treat as I do the remarks on birds and flowers, for you will expect something beyond a mere description of their persons. Like the plants, they languish in the summer, and when we landed, I saw but few whose cheek retained any tint of the rose; the children, in particular, struck me as having a sickly appearance. But this month of cool weather has already restored their bloom to many. They are tall and slender; though there are a few handsome brunettes, they are generally fair, with light hair and full blue eyes. I have seen some who are really lovely-but it is that evanescent loveliness which does not survive the first bloom of youth. The young girls, who at the age of fifteen or sixteen are just merging into the woman, have an air of charming simplicity-a certain naivete and winningness of manner, which is very pleasing to strangers. They are amiable and affectionate, exemplary in the discharge of the domestic duties, and extremely quiet and retiring; which surprised me, when I heard that, with but few exceptions, the young ladies receive their education in a boys' school. In several of the grammar-schools nearly a third are females, some of whom learn to construe Greek and Latin. As they are great sufferers under a system which prevents them from acquiring the more feminine accomplishments, I am glad to find that several ladies' seminaries are about to be established in Bermuda, which will call forth the talents they undoubtedly possess, and open a wider field for intellectual conversation. The gentlemen are very domestic, distinguished for their hospitality and attention to strangers, and for the uprightness and integrity which characterize their commercial transactions. Many of them have been called to offices of high trust in other colonies, as well as in the mother country.

She devoted more attention to the subject of black Bermudians, writing:

Some most Caliban looking negroes have just been dancing on the lawn; for in this season of general festivity, they are all permitted to indulge in the wildest mirth and revelry. The oldest among them participates with the child in the delights of their Gombey-a show which reminds me of the 'Jack-in-the-Green' scenes of our May-day chimney-sweepers. Here nature clothes them with their dusky livery, and they endeavour to heighten the effect by a plentiful bedaubing of red and yellow paints, scarlet cloth, flowers and ribbons. They completely besieged my room, which opens on the garden, so that I was forced to remain a close prisoner, and listen to their rude songs, which I should fancy must be very like the wild yelling scream that we read of in African travels. How much would the diffusion of true christian principles do for these poor people, by teaching them the real nature of rejoicing, and the folly of all these superstitious festivities.

The most famous Gombey parties are those of Hamilton and Hearne Bay; they were preceded by really tolerable bands, composed of negroes dressed in a neat white uniform with scarlet facings. These musicians are all self-taught, and play many favourite airs with great accuracy. This is the more surprising, since they do not know a single note in music. They learn and play every thing by ear, and certainly have great natural taste, and love for music.

When engaged about their work, or walking along the road, they generally beguile the time with a song; and in the evening you frequently hear the sounds of a flute or violin from a negro cottage. Many also possess the talent of extemporaneous composition, which they exercise in finding words for Di piacer and various Italian airs. Others content themselves with singing the last new song, and 'I'd be a butterfly,' and 'Oh, no, we never mention her,' are beginning to be general favourites.

There is a black woman here who ranks high as an improvisatrice; every passing event, every one who is so unfortunate as to incur her displeasure, is made the subject of her verse. A slave, an industrious man, to whom she does not bear a very friendly feeling, had the misfortune, a short time ago, to be robbed of a bag in which he had been hoarding some doubloons towards the purchase of his freedom. All pitied the poor fellow; when he one day came up to me in tears, saying that no one would credit his story since Piny had been making a song upon him, which had got all over Hamilton; and when he attempted to enquire after his doubloons, the negroes answered him by singing this song. These verses are of course very uncouth, but possess a great deal of wit.

A thoughtless gaiety of disposition characterises the negro; and it has perhaps been wisely bestowed to counterbalance the pressure of the religious and moral degradation under which he labours. In proportion as this is removed, will his mind be open to more serious impressions.

The islands of Bermuda were first colonized in the year 1612, and were soon afterwards supplied with Negroes, partly from the coast of Africa, and partly from the West Indies, which had been previously settled. The population of Bermuda consists of about 10,000 souls, of which the proportions of white and coloured are nearly equal.

The latter are mostly in a state of slavery, not above seven hundred and forty having been emancipated, or born free. Instances of manumission are not frequent, and it was only during a late session of the local legislature, that a law was passed which gave the slave a legal right to property that might purchase his emancipation.

It must be confessed that in these islands slavery wears the mildest aspect of which that pitiable condition is susceptible. The character of the Bermudians is kind and humane, and their slaves enjoy many secular advantages of which the poor in our own country are frequently destitute. To the enslaved Negro all the wants of nature are amply supplied. He is, under every contingency, clothed, fed, and attended in sickness, at his master's cost. The ancient laws of slavery, odious and merciless as they are, are never enforced against him, and instances of domestic or private cruelty are, I believe I may venture to assert, almost unknown. Indeed, in many houses the young Negro grows up with his master's children, and is considered as one of the family.

Still, however, after all these concessions, the coloured inhabitants of Bermuda are bondsmen, and have long suffered the two heaviest ills of bondage, a political incapacity to receive equal justice, and a spiritual privation of religious instruction and happiness.

The gleam of Christianity which penetrated the dreary dungeon of their African superstition, was at first so faint that it served rather to discover the gloom than to dispel the darkness which shrouded them; and having embraced the profession of the gospel, they adopted its name without receiving its influence in their heart. It is only within the last five or six years that any regular system has been adopted to give the coloured people instruction in schools connected with the church of England. This blessing is now imparted to nearly 1000 persons, in which number I do not include those who are educated in the schools under the dissenters, some of which are very flourishing.

As there are no plantations of sugar-cane, the negroes are employed in light agricultural labour, but principally as domestic servants. The entire wealth of many individuals often consists in two, three, twelve, or more of these slaves; and if the owner has no occasion for their services himself, he hires one out as a carpenter, another as a mason, house-servant, &c. They regularly bring their full wages to their master, who commonly allows them a small proportion of their earnings. The price of labour varies from a pistorine (tenpence sterling), to a dollar (four shillings sterling) per day.

In their spare hours they (I mean the mechanics) are permitted to work on their own account; and it is by no means unusual for slaves to work out their freedom.

A singular circumstance occurred a short time since. A slave, after having obtained his own freedom by his industry, went to his master to purchase his wife. When her owner offered to give him her deed of manumission, the man positively refused to have one drawn up: and thus the wife is literally her husband's slave. Surely, if slavery knew no other evil, the abuse of such a power as this would prove the iniquity of the system.

Some of the free negroes are industrious and respectable; every thing, as among us, of course, depends upon individual exertion. If the negro is inclined to work, there seems to be no reason why he should not be as successful as an English labourer. That slaves are frequently so little disposed to labour, is probably because they know that, whether they work or not, their master is bound to support them. The slothful are therefore not made to feel so sensibly the consequences of their idleness, while the upright and conscientious have only the very abstract motive of their master's interest to encourage them to diligence and fidelity:-altogether the system of slavery is a sad check upon active industry and persevering exertions; and I am convinced, that, even with a temporary loss, the slave-owners would ultimately be infinite gainers by the introduction of free labour, and the power of employing only such workmen and servants as should produce a given quantity of labour for fair and stipulated remuneration.

It is a great misfortune to a slave if he happens to be married to a free woman. His time is of course his master's, and yet he must find a house, food and clothing for his wife and family. There is a poor man here, a native North American Indian, who is in this situation, and his family are consequently in great poverty.

The price of a slave varies from 25l. (but these are of the very lowest class,) to 70l. and even 100l. currency. But there are some who are above all price, and whom their owners would not part with for any sum.

I know a slave, a religious and well-informed young man, who is a carpenter by trade, and being an excellent workman, can earn one dollar per day-that is, about 100l. currency, or 70l. sterling per annum. This sum he takes regularly to his owner. As it would of course enable him to maintain himself respectably, he is very anxious to be free, and has offered any sum that may be asked, but his master refuses to listen to any terms. As he has laboured faithfully many years, he naturally feels himself aggrieved; and yet such is the strength of his Christian principles, that he never speaks of his master but in terms of the highest respect. To such a character as this, who can doubt that emancipation would prove a blessing?

Several persons have given freedom to their slaves-oftenest I think to a female. But should the poor woman happen to marry a slave, she is in most cases a sufferer, as all her children are of course free, and dependent upon her for support.

I do not think that there are above three or four native Africans in Bermuda, the rest are born here. One of these Africans is a female, who has her face curiously slashed and tattooed; another, a man, who lives near us, and is one of the most good tempered, gay, and thoughtless beings in the world. He one day told me a long story of his having been carried off in a big ship while playing in a garden with his brothers and sisters. But I rather suspect there was some little romance about this. Having by chance seen my guitar, he now comes frequently and begs for some of my 'fiddle strings,' promising that in return he will play me the bravest tune at the gombeys. I had often remonstrated with him for not attending church; when he one afternoon made his appearance there, and told me very gravely the next morning that he had put the date into the little book which I had given him; that he would look at it every Sunday, and that when he died he would have it laid upon his heart and buried with him. 'And surely,' said he, 'if I can find legs to go every morning to Hamilton to get doubloons for my mistress, I may as well get a bit of good to my soul by going to church on Sundays.'

A Negro is the most loquacious being on earth-he seems to talk in spite of himself, and is a very child in the expression of his feelings.

Lloyd's negative comments on the dissenters reflected the Church of England's belated attempts to counter the inroads made by Methodists with coloured Bermudians. Although the Church of England is the established church, and as such was the only church originally permitted to operate in Bermuda, Presbyterians were permitted to have separate churches and to conduct their own services during the 18th century, and Methodists were permitted worship in the 19th century, despite initial steps taken by the Government to prevent this. The Wesleyan Methodists sought to include enslaved blacks resulting in 1800 in the passage of a law by the Parliament of Bermuda barring any but Church of England and Presbyterian ministers from preaching. In December 1800, the Methodist Reverend John Stephenson was incarcerated for six months for preaching to slaves. The Methodists also promoted education of slaves. The Church of England had generally been unwelcoming to slaves, and was never able to catch up to the Methodist's lead. In 1869, the African Methodist Episcopal Church was launched in Bermuda, and today the Anglican Church of Bermuda (as the Church of England in Bermuda was re-titled in 1978), though the largest denomination, has a disproportionately white membership. Stephenson was followed in 1808 by the Reverend Joshua Marsden. There were 136 members of the Society when Marsden left Bermuda in 1812. The Methodists were permitted to conduct baptisms and weddings, but not funerals for some time (the only civil cemeteries in Bermuda prior to the 20th century having all been attached to the churchyards of the nine Church of England parish churches and the Presbyterian Christ Church in Warwick), which were the remit of the established church.

The foundation stone of a Wesleyan Methodist Chapel was laid in St. George's Town on 8 June 1840, the local Society (by then numbering 37 class leaders, 489 Members, and 20 other communicants) having previously occupied a small, increasingly decrepit building that had been damaged beyond use in a storm in 1839. The inscription on the foundation stone included: Mr. James Dawson is the gratuitous Architect; Mr. Robert Lavis Brown, the Overseer. The Lot of Land on which the Chapel is built was purchased, 24 April 1839, from Miss Caroline Lewis, for Two hundred and fifty pounds currency. The names of the Trustees are, William Arthur Outerbridge, William Gibbons, Thomas Stowe Tuzo, Alfred Tucker Deane, James Richardson, Thomas Richardson, John Stephens, Samuel Rankin Higgs, Robert Lavis Brown, James Andrew Durnford, Thomas Argent Smith, John P. Outerbridge, and Benjamin Burchall. The African Methodist Episcopal Church (AME) First District website records that in the autumn of 1869, three farsighted Christian men—Benjamin Burchall of St. George's, William B. Jennings of Devonshire and Charles Roach Ratteray of Somerset—set in motion the wheels that brought African Methodism to Bermuda. The first AME church in Bermuda was erected in 1885 in Hamilton Parish, on the shore of Harrington Sound, and titled St. John African Methodist Episcopal Church (the congregation had begun previously as part of the British Methodist Episcopal Church of Canada). Although the Church of England (since 1978, titled the Anglican Church of Bermuda) remains the largest denomination in Bermuda (15.8%), the AME quickly flourished (accounting for 8.6% of the population today), overtaking the Wesleyan Methodists (2.7% today).

Among other observations of coloured Bermudians, Lloyd also recorded:

But notwithstanding all this good humour, the passions of the negro are violent, and his anger easily roused. A few evenings ago a fine and generous hearted youth, whose complexion may vie with the raven's wing, felt his honour mortally offended on being called a black nigger by a negro a few shades lighter than himself; he instantly seized a knife that was lying before him, and would have plunged it into the man's breast, had not some one providentially held back his arm. To be called a Black Nigger seems to be considered the very acme of insult, and, like the 'Dummer Junge' of the German students must be avenged.

Usage of the word "nigger" was generally avoided in Bermuda, where blacks and whites always lived in close quarters (and language was characterised by euphemisms), even by the most negrophobic whites, and, unlike the reclamation of the word by some blacks in the United States of America, it has not been adopted or made in any way acceptable today by Bermuda's blacks and remains the foulest and most unutterable racial slur. Lieutenant-Colonel John McMaster Milling, an avid fisherman who befriended coloured Bermudians who shared his passion, wrote of his period serving in Bermuda as a Lieutenant in the 2nd Battalion, The Bedfordshire Regiment, from 1910 to 1912:

...they are blacker still. But you mustn't say so! The word nigger is the highest insult. He's a coloured gentleman, and you must be very careful about it indeed. Thomas Atkins used to find this nicety of nomenclature of great inconvenience on first arrival. To him, with his easy-going tongue, and an aptness at the best of times to refer to a spade as a spade, everything connected with a black skin was automatically a nigger. It led at first to an odd fracas or two, but, like everything else in Nature, given time and a hopeful constitution, rectification came all in its own due course".

Later writers generally agreed on the subject of Bermuda's politely mannered society, generally understood to be a requirement in a small, tightly knit community which could not afford to allow tempers to be frayed.

As Christiana Rounds wrote in Harper's Magazine (re-published in an advertising pamphlet by A.L Mellen, the Proprietor of the Hamilton Hotel in 1876):

Those who plume themselves on their culture, and who regard all places except those in which they have resided as very benighted quarters, would, of course, look upon Bermuda as almost outside the limits of civilization. Closer acquaintance would dispel many of these delusions. A stranger would be impressed at once with the marked courtesy of the people. From the lowest to the highest one will receive the most polite attention. A simplicity almost Arcadian characterizes their manners, especially those of the women. Many who have led very circumscribed lives, who have never been away from Bermuda, possess an ease and grace which would do credit to habitues of society, arising apparently from perfect faith in others, and an earnest desire to add to their pleasure in every possible way. In matters of etiquette they are generally much more exact than Americans. The kindliness and formality aside — and they are not to be underrated — one would hardly derive much inspiration from the Bermudian, whose outlook is not a broad one. His life has not fostered extended views, and he is, perhaps, as little to be blamed for not possessing them as for being born in mid-ocean. They are a comfortable, well-to-do set of people, with here and there a family possessing ample means. As in England, property, especially real estate, remains in the same family for a long period. There is very little real suffering from poverty, though there are many poor people, who had rather be poor than make the necessary exertion to improve their condition. In this connection the colored people deserve some notice, forming, as they do, a large majority of the population. The importation of negroes from Africa ceased long before the abolition of slavery, which may account for the improved type of physiognomy one encounters here. The faces of some are fine, and many of the women are really pretty. They are polite, about as well dressed as anybody, attend all the churches, and are members thereof, are more interested in schools than the poor whites, and a very large proportion of them can both read and write. They have their own secret and benevolent societies, and are just as improvident here as elsewhere. If they have any money, work is uninteresting to them. When utterly destitute they are ready to improve their finances, but when pay-day comes they are quite apt to retire from business and spend their earnings, running the risk of again finding employment when compelled by necessity; and most of them live in this make-shift way all their lives. A strong feeling of prejudice exists against them, which will probably die out when they have acquired a few of the sterling virtues at present monopolized by white people.

H.C. Walsh wrote in the December 1890 issue of Lippincott's Monthly Magazine:

The population of the islands amounts to about fifteen thousand souls, of whom something over sixty per cent, are colored. The white population is mostly composed of descendants of the old English settlers, with a sprinkling of immigrants from America and Portugal. The negroes are descended from African and American-Indian slaves : they were emancipated in 1834, and now enjoy the same political privileges as the whites; they seem anxious to improve themselves, and are gradually taking a better position. Their upward progress is looked upon with considerable uneasiness by the whites, who, of course, are anxious to retain the upper hand, and seem to fear the negroes as possible rivals in the local government of Bermuda.

As Bermuda's maritime economy began to falter during the 19th century, Bermudians would turn some of the woodland over to growing export crops, but most of the farming (or gardening, as it is known in Bermuda) would be carried out by imported labour, beginning with immigration from Portuguese Atlantic islands in the 1840s. Later in the 19th century, large-scale West Indian immigration began (initially, also to provide labourers for the new export agriculture industry, then greatly increased at the turn of the century during the expansion of the Royal Naval Dockyard). The Black West Indians, unlike the Portuguese immigrants, were British citizens and not obliged to leave Bermuda, as many Portuguese were, at the end of a contracted period, although they were effectively indentured to the firm contracted by the Admiralty to carry out the construction work, and due to delays in construction, many found themselves in financial hardship.

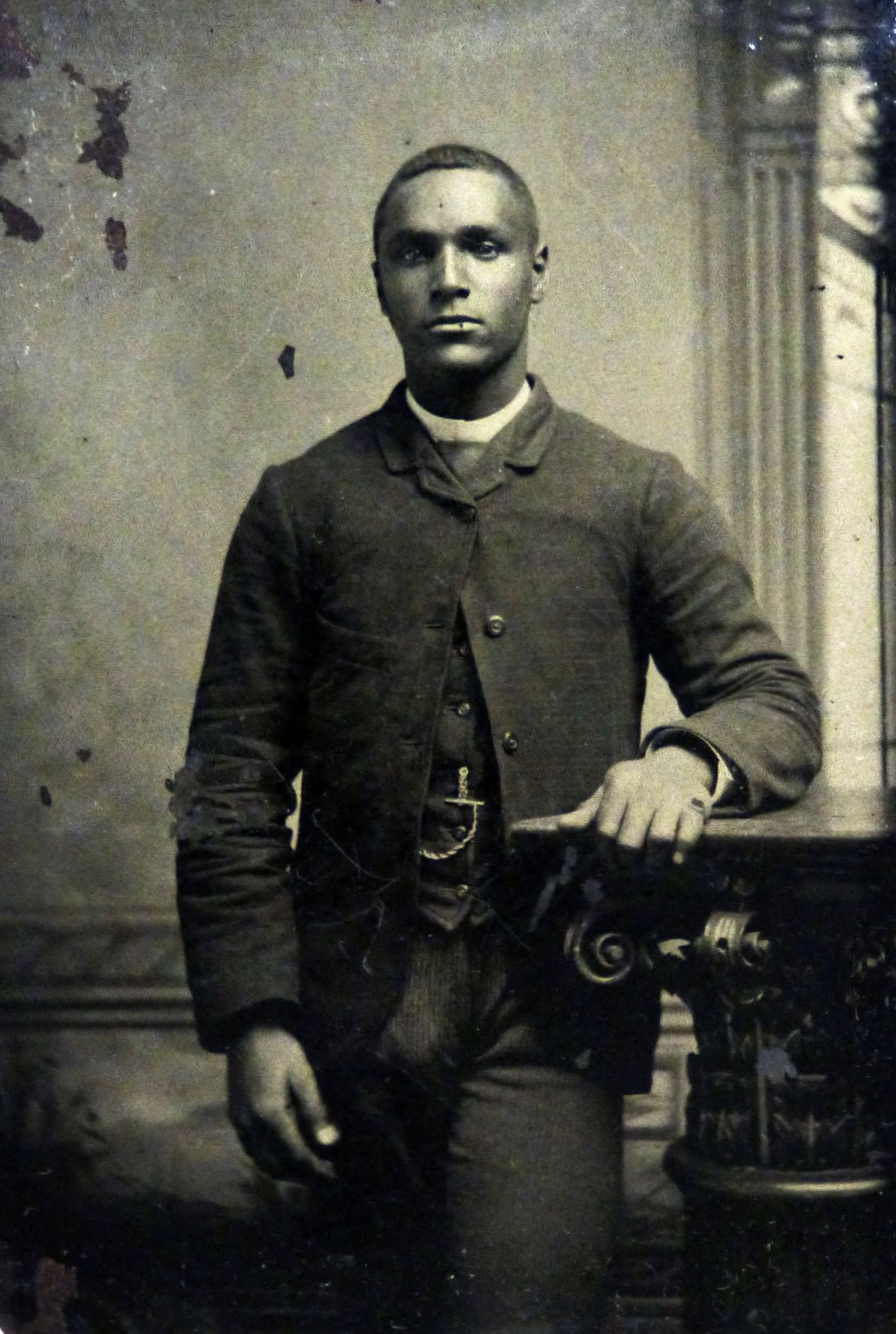
Young 19th-century Bermudian man

In the latter 20th century, those with any degree of sub-Saharan African ancestry (which was virtually everyone who had been defined as coloured) were redefined as Black, with Asian and other non-White Bermudians defined by separate racial groups (although it also, in the 1960s, ceased to be the practice to record race on birth or other records). On census returns, only in recent years have Bermudians been given the option to define themselves by more than one race (the 2000 Census gave respondents the options of black, white, Asian, black and white, black and other, white and other, other, and not stated), although there was considerable opposition to this from many Black leaders who discouraged Black Bermudians from doing so.

In the U.S., there is similar resistance from minority groups to defining themselves by more than one race on census returns, or as multi-racial, as it is feared that this will fragment demographic groups, and lower the percentage of the population recorded as belonging to a particular race, with possible negative effects on government policies (such as affirmative action) aimed at addressing the concerns of disadvantaged minority groups. As Bermuda's Blacks (whether perceived as a diverse, multi-racial group or as homogeneously Black African) have been in the majority for two centuries, but are still comparatively less well-off than White Bermudians (the Government of Bermuda's 2009 employment survey showed the median annual income for blacks for the year 2007-8 was $50,539, and for whites was $71,607, with white Bermudian clerks earning $8,000 a year more than black Bermudian clerks, and black Bermudian senior officials and managers earning $73,242 compared to $91,846 for white Bermudian senior officials and managers; the racial disparity was also observed among expatriate workers, with white non-Bermudian senior officials and managers earning $47,000 more than black non-Bermudian senior officials and managers), this fear may presumably also be the cause for the opposition to census reform in Bermuda. Large-scale West Indian immigration over the last century has also decreased the ratio of Black Bermudians who are multi-racial, and hardened attitudes. Most academic books on the subject emphasise the characteristic multi-racialism of Bermuda's Black population (at least those who might be defined as ethnically Bermudian, as opposed to those resulting from recent immigration), and it has been pointed out in other publications that, if those Black Bermudians who have White ancestry were numbered instead with the White population, the Black population of Bermuda would be negligible.

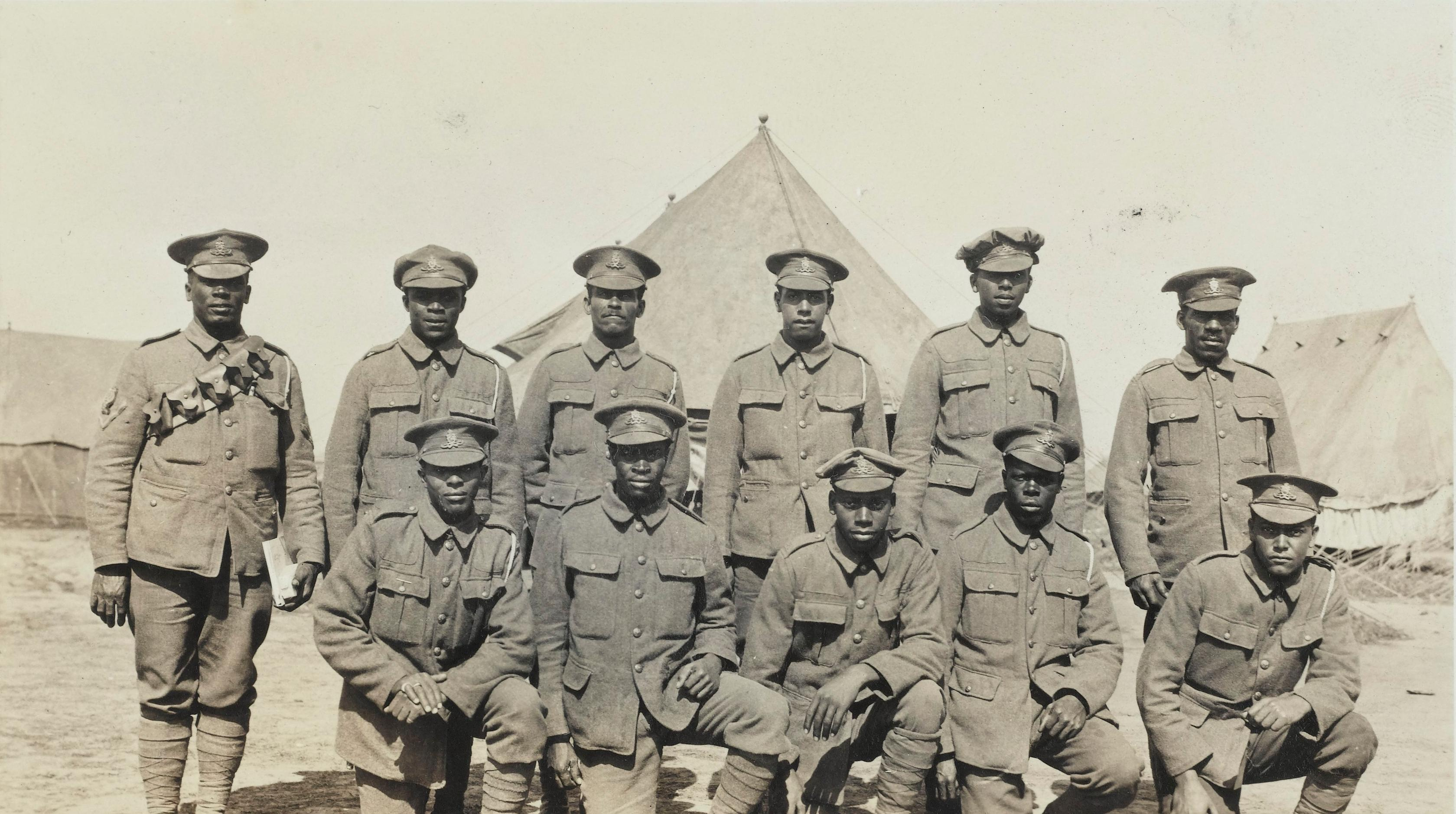
Soldiers of the Bermuda Contingent of the Royal Garrison Artillery on the Western Front in July 1916; volunteers for overseas service from the Bermuda Militia Artillery (BMA), which recruited coloured men, but restricted commissions to whites

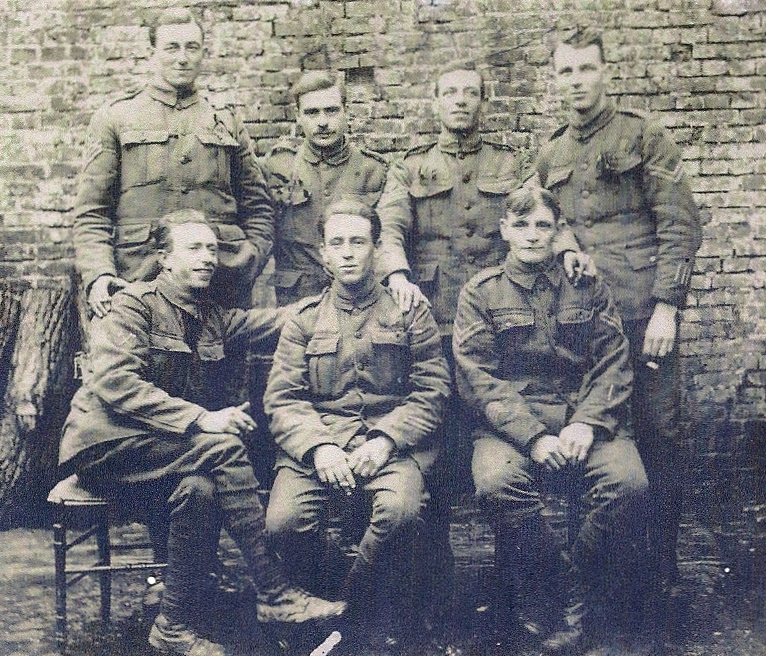
Soldiers of the Bermuda Volunteer Rifle Corps (BVRC), attached to the Lincolnshire Regiment on the Western Front. The BVRC only recruited whites

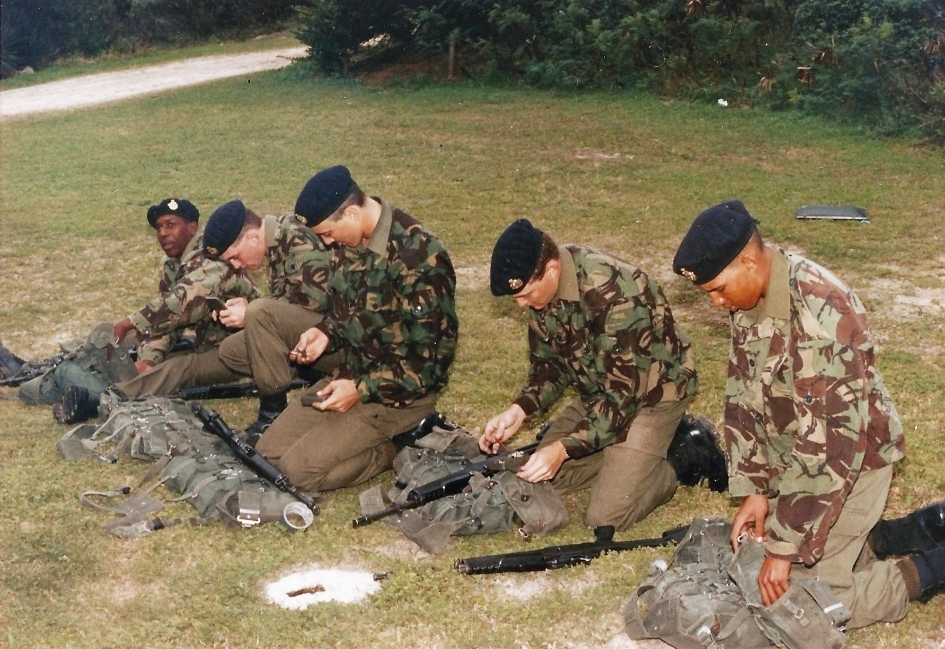
The racially-segregated BMA and BVRC (re-titled the Bermuda Rifles in 1949) amalgamated in 1965 to form the Bermuda Regiment (now the Royal Bermuda Regiment)

This overlooks the resentment felt by most Black Bermudians over a history of racial repression, segregation, discrimination and marginalisation that continued long after slavery, and that did not distinguish between black and bi/multi-racial Bermudians. With the increasingly racially divisive politics that have followed the election of the PLP government, as well as the decades of increasing costs-of-living, the exclusion of unskilled workers from jobs in the white collar international business sector that has come to dominate Bermuda's economy, and the global economic downturn, all of which many Black Bermudians perceive as hitting them hardest, there is little sentiment today amongst people who have long been obliged to think of themselves as Black, in opposition to being White, to identify even partly with their European ancestry. Additionally, most multi-racial Bermudians do not today result from having parents of different races, but inherit diverse ancestry via many generations of mixed-race forebears, most of whom may have assumed themselves to have been entirely of Black African ancestry, and certainly were generally characterised as such by whites (and hence by the mainstream culture). The Progressive Labour Party, the first party formed in 1963 before party politics was legalised, quickly came to be dominated by West Indians and West Indian Bermudians such as Lois Browne-Evans (or more recently Rolfe Commissiong, the son of a Trinidadian musician, Premier Edward David Burt, whose mother is Jamaican), and Deputy Premier Walter Roban (son of Matthew Roban, from St. Vincent and the Grenadines), and is still derided by many white and black Bermudians as promoting racially divisive, black nationalist "plantation politics" (a term with double meaning in traditionally sea-faring Bermuda where there remains a strong stigma against agricultural work).

Many West Indian labourers emigrated from the West Indies at the end of the 19th Century as United States victory in the 1898 Spanish-American War was to result in United States companies (such as United Fruit Company, formed in 1899) gaining control of the sugar and tropical fruit production of several former Spanish colonies, driving down the prices that British West Indian producers of the same products, exporting primarily to the United States, could obtain. This co-incided with the expansion of the Royal Naval Dockyard in Bermuda. The system of convict labour that had been relied upon to build the original yard (which became the "North Yard" with the completion of the new "South Yard") had ended in the 1860s, and with the price of labour being high in Bermuda, the Admiralty's contractor brought in desperate, impoverished manual labourers from the West Indies without consulting the local Government.

Bermudian blacks were generally antagonistic to West Indians, who, like the early Portuguese immigrants, were perceived as driving down the cost of labour, primarily to the disadvantage of Bermudian blacks, and in recent decades (Jamaicans especially) have often been blamed for the illegal drug trade and violent crimes, including the 1996 murder of Rebecca Middleton. In recent decades, West Indians also came to be associated in Bermuda with law enforcement. The difficulty faced by the Bermuda Police Service in obtaining recruits locally had long led to recruitment of constables from the British Isles, which resulted in criticism of the racial make up of the force not reflecting that of the wider community. Consequently, in 1966 the Bermuda Police Force (as it was then titled) began also recruiting constables from British West Indian police forces, starting with seven constables from Barbados. Although the practice of recruiting from the British west Indies would continue, it was not deemed entirely successful. As the "Bermuda Report for the year 1971" recorded:

More recently police have been recruited from the Caribbean with a view to correcting the racial imbalance in the force. This has not been particularly successful, Bermudians regarding West Indians as much, if not more, expatriate as recruits from the United Kingdom, which has been and remains the main source of recruitment.

Bermudian blacks described black West Indians disparagingly as "Jump-ups", and were in turn perceived by many West Indian blacks as what in the United States are described as Uncle Toms, although more derogatory terms have been used for Bermudian blacks who oppose the party's agenda, especially on independence from the United Kingdom. Consequently, the party long struggled to unite Bermudian blacks with West Indian Bermudians under a banner of racial solidarity against white Bermudians to whom Bermudian blacks were tied by common heritage and blood, and did not win an election until 1998, after the United Bermuda Party (which PLP politicians characterised as the party for whites) was split by internal conflict following Premier John W. Swan's forcing an unpopular referendum on independence in 1995. The desire amongst black nationalists, and especially those of West Indian stock, to obscure the distinction between Bermudian blacks and West Indians by stressing black African heritage has also contributed to intolerance of Bermudian blacks identifying with their non-African, especially their white, ancestry.

Despite these concerns, small numbers of Black Bermudians have chosen to describe themselves on census returns as mixed-racial, and the Native American demographic, which had disappeared for centuries, is slowly re-emerging, as more Bermudians – especially on St. David's Island – choose to identify to some degree, if not exclusively, with their Native American ancestry (although many may feel that, in an increasingly polarised climate, this is a safer option than identifying themselves as in any way White or European).

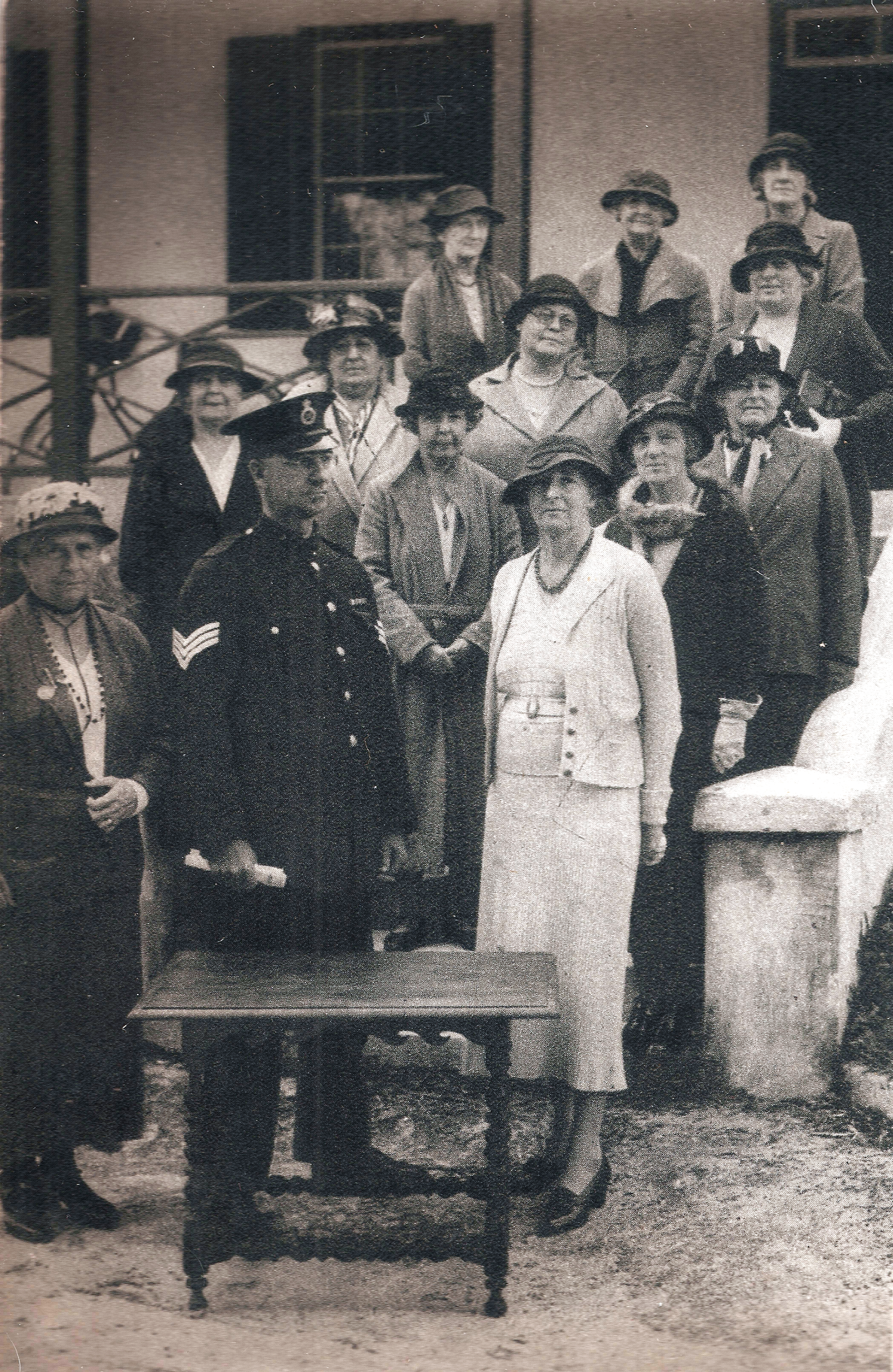
A Police Sergeant confiscates women's suffrage activist Gladys Morrell's table in the 1930s

Nonetheless, any assumption of Bermudian demographics that is based on census returns, or other sources derived from them, suffers from anecdotal evidence being the basis of all of the data, in asking Bermudians to self-identify, without resorting to any documentary evidence or genetic studies being used to confirm their ancestry, if not their identification. There is similar pressure on Black Bermudians (most of whom are multi-racial) not to self-identify as mixed race as there is in Blacks in the US, where President Barack Obama, raised by his single, white mother, sparked debate when he identified himself on the census as black, rather than mixed race, and in the UK, in both of which countries greater flexibility is also now allowed for people to describe themselves racially.

Portuguese immigration, from Atlantic islands including the Azores, Madeira and the Cape Verde Islands, began in the 19th century to provide labour for the nascent agricultural industry. From the beginning, Portuguese labourers, who have emigrated under special agreements, have not been allowed to do so on the basis of permanent immigration. They were expected to return to their homelands after a fixed period. Some were able to stay, however and by the 1940s there was a sizeable number Portuguese-Bermudians who were legally Bermudian (and British by citizenship). Until the recession of the 1990s, however, Bermuda continued to rely on large-scale immigration of temporary Portuguese workers who laboured at jobs Bermudians considered unworthy (notably, anything to do with agriculture or horticulture). Many of these immigrants lived and worked in Bermuda for decades on repeatedly renewed work permits, without gaining the right to permanent residence, British citizenship, or Bermudian status. When work permits were not renewed, especially during the recession, many were forced to return to the Azores, often with full-grown children who had been born and brought up in Bermuda. Although the numbers of Portuguese guest workers has not returned to its former levels, the number of Bermudians today described as Portuguese (often considered a distinct racial group from Whites of Northern European ancestry, and historically stigmatised by all other Bermudians) is usually given as ten percent of the population. This number does not include many Black Bermudians with White Portuguese ancestry, and obscures also that some of the Portuguese immigrants were Blacks from the Cape Verde Islands. The actual percentage of Bermudians with Portuguese ancestry is likely far larger.

Noting that Bermudians of Portuguese heritage have made considerable contributions to the Island – from politics and public service, to sport, entertainment and industry – Premier Edward David Burt announced that 4 November 2019 "will be declared a public holiday to mark the 170th anniversary of the arrival of the first Portuguese immigrants in Bermuda. Those first immigrants arrived from Madeira aboard the vessel the Golden Rule on 4th November 1849."

== 1950 Census ==
Bermuda Census 1950 (total population 37,000) Population born abroad according to country of birth and length of residence in Bermuda
Country of birth	Years resident in Bermuda										
Country of birth	0–4	5–9	10–14	15–19	20–24	25–29	30–34	35–39	40 and over	Not stated	Total
British Isles	1,436	118	187	149	281	236	107	47	91	66	2,718
Canada	384	62	40	52	50	48	14	9	29	39	727
Jamaica	12	2	5	6	11	5	2	1	9	8	61
Trinidad	3	3	2	3	3	8	1	1	1	3	28
Barbados	13	19	4	2	8	21	2	8	21	4	102
Other British; Caribbean	53	29	14	48	243	201	100	134	276	99	1,197
Bahamas	1			3						1	5
Azores	180	141	54	43	179	140	12	8	79	54	890
USA	1,439	165	107	102	91	91	46	33	55	78	2,207
France	29			1	2		2		2		36
Spain	3						1				4
Italy	6				1						7
Germany	17		1						1	2	21
Other European	12	1	1		2	1			2	1	20
India	18		3	5	6	2	2	2	1	3	42
China	4				1		1			26	32
Others	136	16	18	14	34	35	15	7	29	17	321
Not stated	21	1		1	1		3		1	208	236
TOTAL	3,767	557	436	429	913	788	308	250	597	609	8,654

== Source populations and genetic research ==
The founder population that settled in Bermuda between 1609 and the 1630s was almost entirely English. Typical Bermudian surnames that date to the seventeenth century indicate that the primary area of England from which settlers were sourced during that period was East Anglia and surrounding counties. Examples include Ingham, from Ingham, Lincolnshire, and Trimingham, from the village of Trimingham in Norfolk. This ancestry is shared, today, by both white and black Bermudians (the latter demographic group, as noted above, being made up of individuals of a blend of African, European and Native American ancestry, though not necessarily in that order). A continuous inward flow of immigrants from other parts of the British Isles, other British (or formerly British) territories, and foreign countries has added to the white population over the centuries, including sustained immigration from Portuguese Atlantic islands from the 1840s, and numerous Royal Navy and British Army personnel who were discharged and remained in Bermuda to contribute to the permanent population (white and multi-racial). The white population (that is, those Bermudians presumed to be entirely of European ancestry) has consequently grown more diverse. No genetic study has as yet been conducted either of or including the white population of Bermuda. Although European ancestry is the largest component of Bermuda's ancestry, and those entirely of European ancestry are by far the largest mono-racial group (based on actual ancestry, rather than self-identification), whites (and the European ancestry of blacks) are often excluded when Bermuda's source populations are discussed. By example, National Geographic's Genographic Project Reference Population (Geno 2.0 Next Generation) for "Bermudian" (as of 28 June 2020) was described on its website (which was taken offline after 30 June 2020) as "based on samples collected from mixed populations living in Bermuda" (this was not based on a survey of even the mixed, or other-than-entirely-European population, of Bermuda, as no such survey of all of Bermuda has been carried out).

In the British West Indian islands (and also in the southern continental colonies that were to become states of the United States of America), the majority of enslaved blacks brought across the Atlantic came from West Africa (roughly between modern Senegal and Ghana). By contrast, very little of Bermuda's original black emigration came (directly or indirectly) from this area. The first blacks to arrive in Bermuda in any numbers were free blacks who came in the mid-seventeenth century from Spanish-speaking areas of the West Indies, and most of the remainder were recently enslaved Africans captured from the Spanish. Spain was little involved in the trans-Atlantic slave trade, instead purchasing enslaved Africans from the Portuguese and Arab slave traders. The Portuguese sourced most of their slaves from South-West Africa, through ports in modern-day Angola; and the Arabs' slave trading was centred in Zanzibar, in South-East Africa.

This history has been well understood from the written record, and was confirmed in 2009 by the only genetic survey of Bermuda, which looked exclusively at the black population of St. David's Island (as the purpose of the study was to seek Native American haplogroups, which could be assumed to be absent from the white population) consequently showed that the African ancestry of black Bermudians (other than those resulting from recent immigration from the British West Indian islands) is largely from a band across southern Africa, from Angola to Mozambique, which is similar to what is revealed in Latin America, but distinctly different from the blacks of the British West Indies and the United States. 68% of the mtDNA (maternal) lineages of the black islanders were found to be African, with the two most common being L0a and L3e, which are sourced from populations spread from Central-West to South-East Africa. These lineages represent less than 5% of the mtDNA lineages of blacks in the United States and the English-speaking West Indies. They are, however, common in Brazil and the Spanish-speaking countries of Latin America. L3e, by example, is typical of !Kung-speaking populations of the Kalahari, as well as of parts of Mozambique and Nigeria. The modern nation where it represents the highest percentage of the population is actually Brazil, where it represents 21% of mtDNA lineages. 31% of the mtDNA lineages of blacks in Bermuda are West Eurasian (European), with J1c being the most common. 1% were Native American.

For NRY (paternal) haplogroups among black Bermudians, the study found about a third were made up of three African ones (of which E1b1a, the most common NRY haplogroup in West and Central African populations, "accounted for the vast majority of the African NRY samples (83%)" ), with the remainder (about 64.79%) being West Eurasian excepting one individual (1.88%) with a Native American NRY haplogroup Q1a3a. Of the individuals with European NRY haplogroups, more than half had R1b1b2, which is common in Europe and is found at frequencies over 75% in England and Wales. None of these percentages can be taken as equivalent to the percentage of ancestry in the black population from the specific regions as genetic drift tends to erase minority haplogroups over generations. This explains the near absence of Native American haplogroups despite the hundreds of Native Americans known to have been involuntarily brought to Bermuda in the seventeenth century.

== Women in Bermuda ==
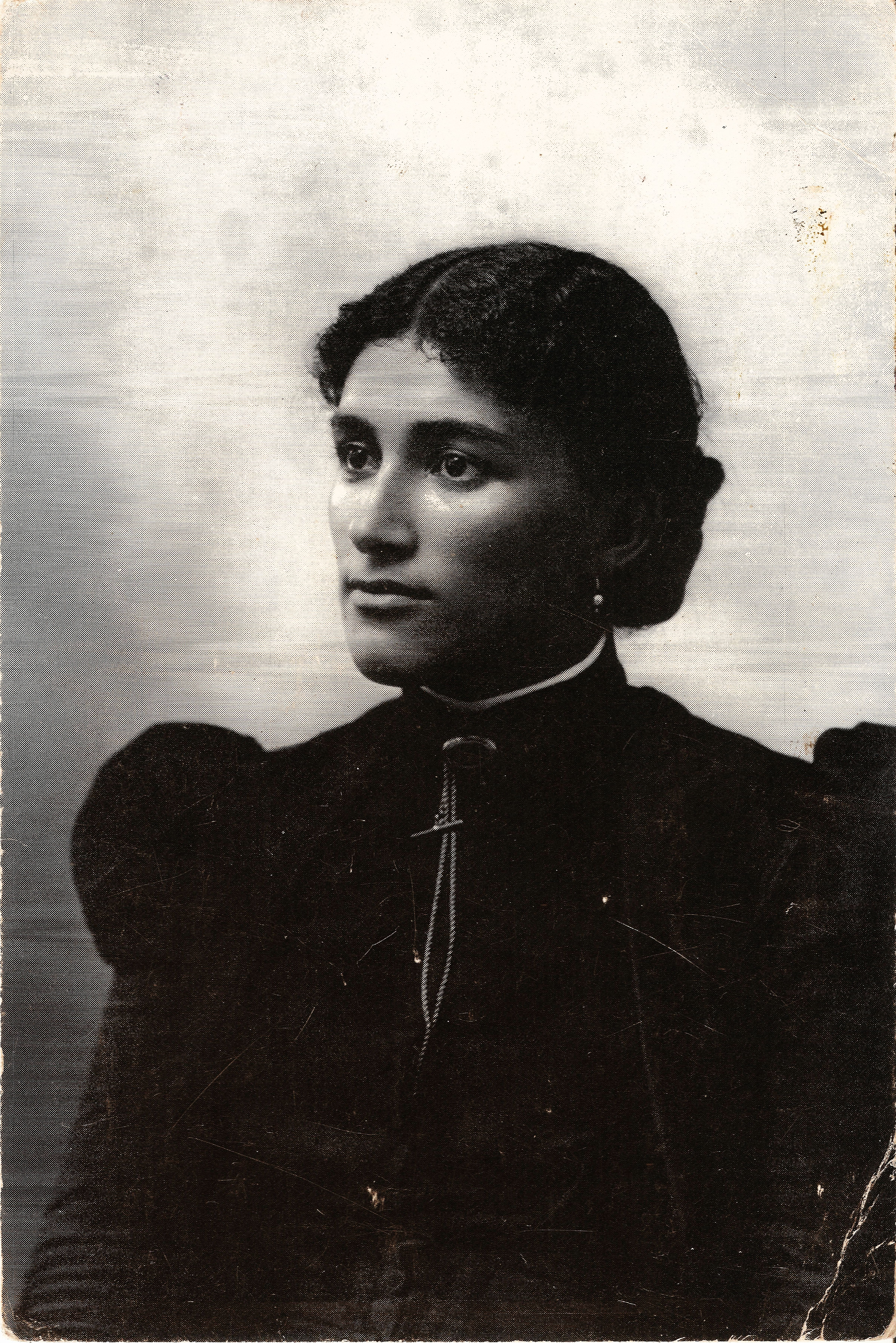
Portrait of Bermudian woman "Rattery" (1885-1890)

Women in Bermuda includes British nationals with local status, British nationals without Bermudian status who are resident in Bermuda, and Commonwealth nationals and foreign nationals who are resident in Bermuda, although in most cases only the first of these groups is intended to be connoted.

Although women and girls were among the passengers of the Sea Venture, the flagship of the Virginia Company that was wrecked at Bermuda in 1609, starting the permanent settlement of the archipelago as an English (following the 1707 union of the Kingdom of England and the Kingdom of Scotland, "British") colony, none were among the three (living) people left in Bermuda in 1610 (when most of the crew and passengers continued to Jamestown, Virginia in two newly-constructed ships. In 1612, with its Royal Charter officially extended to include Bermuda (officially named "Virginiola", and quickly renamed "The Somers Isles") as part of its territory in Virginia, the Virginia Company sent sixty settlers, including women, under a Lieutenant-Governor aboard the "Plough" to join the three men left behind in 1610. An under-company, the Company of the City of London for the Plantacion of The Somers Isles (or Somers Isles Company) was already planned in 1612 and administration of the Somers Isles was transferred to it in 1615, though Bermuda and Virginia continued to be closely interlinked. Bermuda was grouped with the North American continental colonies until 1783 as part of British America, and from then until 1907 as part of British North America, when the Colony of Newfoundland became the Dominion of Newfoundland, leaving Bermuda as the only remaining British colony in the North American region, and it was thereafter administered by the Colonial Office under the same department as the British West Indies. Bermuda's closest neighbours in order of distance are the United States of America (640 miles), Canada (768 miles) and the nearest West Indian islands (roughly 1,000 miles).

The companies would utilise indentured servitude as a source of cheap labour until the latter company lost its Royal Charter in 1684 and the Crown took over direct administration. Most settlers who arrived voluntarily over the early decades of settlement exchanged seven years of servitude for the cost of their transport. The early settlers were disproportionately men, and female convicts were shipped to Bermuda and sold to local men to provide an adequate supply of brides. During the Civil War, women were among the native Irish who were forcibly exported to Bermuda and other trans-Atlantic colonies and sold into servitude. Native American prisoners from areas of the continent that were ethnically cleansed to make way for settlers were also sent to Bermuda in the mid-17th Century, disproportionately women. Although slavery was not to become the feature it did in other colonies, due to the indentured servants, privateers based at Bermuda from its settlement onwards often brought enslaved Africans or people of African ancestry captured from the Spanish or French or other foes. Others arrived via shipwreck, and after the Civil War there was a considerable influx of coloured indentured servants from former Spanish territories annexed by England.

The founder population of the 17th Century was consequently diverse. All women in Bermuda, regardless of status, were constrained by the same laws as elsewhere in England and its colonies. They had no representation, or ability to stand for election, and their property generally became their husbands' upon marriage. Some men were as cruel to their daughters, wives and enslaved females as was common elsewhere, but in 1684, following the revocation of the Somers Isles Company's charter, Bermudians were freed to develop their maritime economy, and by the 18th Century virtually the only industries were shipbuilding and sea faring.

This had a profound effect on the lot of women as most Bermudian men spent months away at sea, leaving wives to handle matters at home as best as they could, with many becoming competent at managing financial affairs. As a significant number of Bermudian men were lost at sea, there were, as mentioned above, a large number of young widows who, having come into possession of their husband's estates (including what had been their own property 'til marriage) declined to remarry and lose their property to another husband. Being a small, closely-knit community, where good manners and modesty were the norm, when Bermudian men were at home they were mindful of their reputations. Mary Prince, born into slavery in Bermuda, related in " The History of Mary Prince" (1831) vicious attacks on his daughter by one of her masters in which she sought to protect the other woman, chastising him that they were in Bermuda, not the Turks Islands (where some Bermudians, free and enslaved, migrated seasonally to gather salt for sale on the continent, and where, out of sight of their wives and polite society, some men resorted to debauchery they would not dare to at home), and his having her bathe his naked body until she refused, .

My old master often got drunk, and then he would get in a fury with his daughter, and beat her till she was not fit to be seen. I remember on one occasion, I had gone to fetch water, and when I Was coming up the hill I heard a great screaming; I ran as fast as I could to the house, put down the water, and went into the chamber, where I found my master beating Miss D—— dreadfully. I strove with all my strength to get her away from him; for she was all black and blue with bruises. He had beat her with his fist, and almost killed her. The people gave me credit for getting her away. He turned round and began to lick me. Then I said, "Sir, this is not Turk's Island." I can't repeat his answer, the words were too wicked—too bad to say. He wanted to treat me the same in Bermuda as he had done in Turk's Island.

He had an ugly fashion of stripping himself quite naked, and ordering me then to wash him in a tub of water. This was worse to me than all the licks. Sometimes when he called me to wash him I would not come, my eyes were so full of shame. He would then come to beat me. One time I had plates and knives in my hand, and I dropped both plates and knives, and some of the plates were broken. He struck me so severely for this, that at last I defended myself, for I thought it was high time to do so. I then told him I would not live longer with him, for he was a very indecent man—very spiteful, and too indecent; with no shame for his servants, no shame for his own flesh. So I went away to a neighbouring house and sat down and cried till the next morning, when I went home again, not knowing what else to do.

After that I was hired to work at Cedar Hills, and every Saturday night I paid the money to my master.

This led to a marked difference in the way women functioned in Bermuda, and were and are perceived (both by themselves and by men), when compared with Britain, the United States, Canada, or the British West Indies. Jennifer M. Smith, the second female Premier of Bermuda, observed that her sex had not been a barrier to her political ascension because "Bermuda is a very matriarchal society, while other Caribbean islands are patriarchal. Bermudian society is often perceived as matriarchal by outsiders.

From the 1840s, there has been a steady immigration from Portuguese Atlantic islands, and there has been a considerable immigration during the 20th Century from the British Isles, the British West Indies, the United states, and Canada, among other areas, often causing culture clashes over the perceived treatment of women by men of various demographic groups (with Bermudians sometimes perceiving West Indian and Portuguese immigrants as patriarchal, or even misogynistic).

== See also ==
- Bermuda
- Cromanty
