= White Bermudians =

Total population
- 19,466 or 31% of the total population 9,197 are Bermuda-born (2016 census)

Regions with significant populations
- Bermuda 19,46631% of total pop. (2016)
- Paget: 3,252
- Pembroke: 3,029
- Smith's: 2,903
- Warwick: 2,565

Languages
- Bermudian English

Religion
- Christianity

Related ethnic groups
- Europeans • White Caribbeans • English • Scottish • Irish • Portuguese • Americans • Canadians

White Bermudians are Bermudians of total or predominantly European ancestry, most notably the British Isles and Portugal, who stand out for having light skin and self-identify as white. In a more official sense, the Department of Statistics uses the term "white". The 2016 Bermuda census reported that White Bermudians are currently the second-largest group representing 31.0% of the population.

Aside from British and Portuguese settlers, Bermuda has welcomed many people from the European diaspora. The islands have also become a popular home for wealthy Britons and Americans.

== History ==
=== Discovery ===
The first Europeans to discover Bermuda were Spanish explorers. The earliest depiction of the island is the inclusion of "La Bermuda" in the map of Pedro Martyr's 1511 Legatio Babylonica. The earliest description of the island was Gonzalo Fernández de Oviedo y Valdés' account of his 1515 visit with Juan de Bermúdez aboard La Garza. Spanish explorer Juan de Bermúdez discovered the island in the early 1500s.

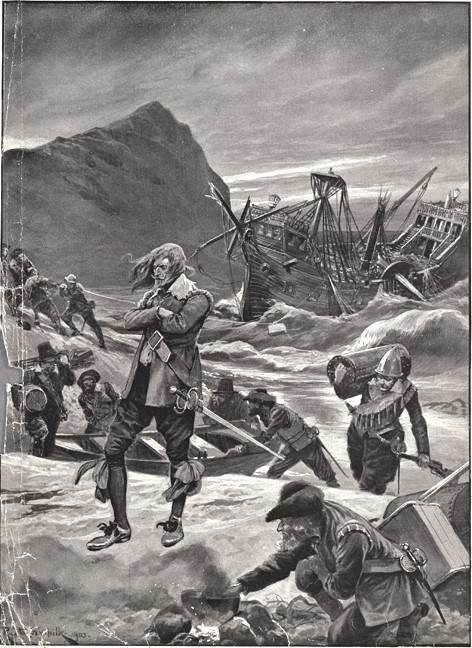
Admiral Sir George Somers wrecked on the islands in 1609 by Richard C. Woodville, 1903.

On 2 June 1609, Sir George Somers had set sail from Plymouth, England aboard Sea Venture, the new flagship of the Virginia Company, leading a fleet of nine vessels, loaded with several hundred settlers, food and supplies for the new English colony of Jamestown, in Virginia. Somers had previous experience sailing with both Sir Francis Drake and Sir Walter Raleigh. The fleet was caught in a storm on 24 July, and Sea Venture was separated and began to founder. When the reefs to the East of Bermuda were spotted, the ship was deliberately driven on them to prevent its sinking, thereby saving all aboard, 150 sailors and settlers, and one dog.

== Permanent settlement ==
Bermuda's first capital, St. George's, was established in 1612. The White population at the time made up the entirety of the Bermuda's population, other than a black and an Indian slave brought in for a very short-lived pearl fishery in 1616, from settlement (which began accidentally in 1609 with the wreck of the Sea Venture) until the middle of the 17th century, and the majority until some point in the 18th century.

The majority of the first European settlers arrived from England as indentured servants or tenant farmers, as most of Bermuda's land was owned by absentee landlords who remained in England as shareholders (adventurers) in the Virginia Company and then its offshoot the Somers Isles Company. Later Irish Gaels were sent to Bermuda after the Cromwellian conquest of Ireland that followed the English Civil War.

== Population history ==
The population of Bermuda on 17 April 1721, was listed as 8,364, composed of: "Totals:—Men on the Muster roll, 1,078; men otherwise, 91; Women, 1,596; boys, 1,072; girls, 1,013. Blacks; Men, 817, women 965; boys 880; girls, 852."

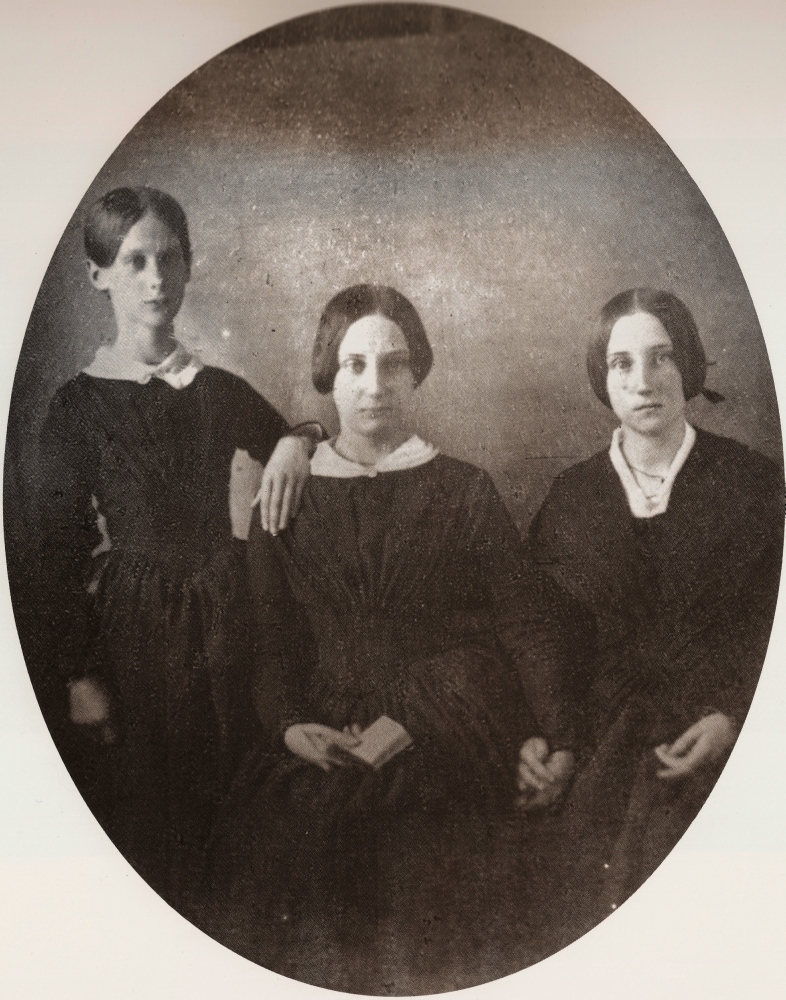
Bermudian Darrell sisters of English descent in 1846.

The Population of Bermuda in 1727 included 4,470 whites (910 men; 1,261 boys; 1,168 women; 1,131 girls) and 3,877 coloured (787 men; 1,158 boys; 945 women; 987 girls).

The term coloured was generally used in preference to black as anyone who was of wholly European ancestry (at least Northern European) was defined as white, leaving everyone else as coloured. This included the multi-racial descendants of the previous minority demographic groups (Black, Irish and Native American), as well as the occasional Jew, Persian, South-Asian, East Asian or other non-White and non-Black Bermudian.

Officially Bermuda has had population censuses since the period (1629-1939) and 8 (1950-2016) during the modern period.

=== Modern census ===
Table shows the population and proportion who identify as white in every census since 1950 to the present.

White Bermudians 1950 - 2016
N.	Year	Population	Pop. (%)
1	1950	14,724	Steady
2	1960	15,892	37.27 ▼
3	1970		Steady
4	1980		Steady
5	1991	21,159	36.4 ▼
6	2000	21,134	34.0 ▼
7	2010	19,926	31.0 ▼
8	2016	19,466	31.0

== Demographics ==
Most White Bermudians are of English, Scottish, Welsh, Irish and Portuguese descent. White people in Bermuda currently make up 31% of the total population according to the 2016 census. In 1849, the first Portuguese arrived from Madeira.

=== Geographic distribution ===
==== 2016 census ====
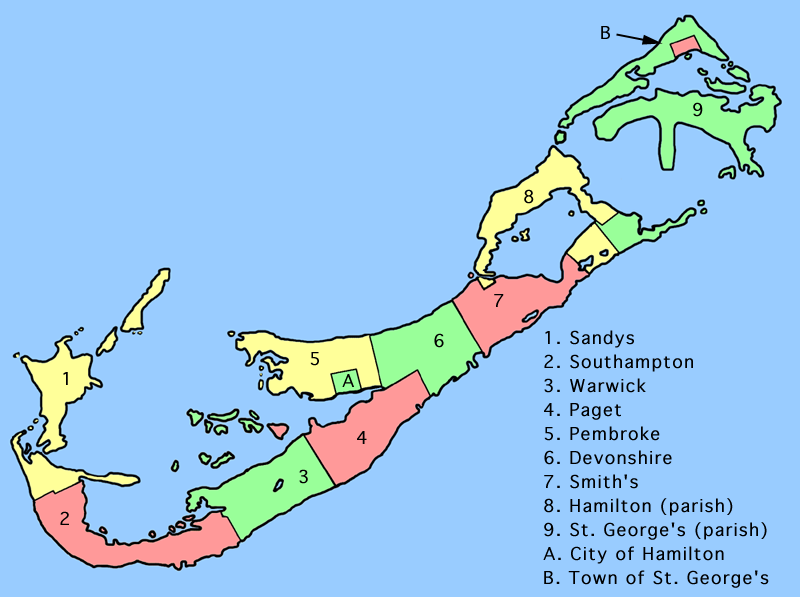
Subdivisions of Bermuda.

Below is the official and 2016 census figures for white Bermudians as a percentage of the total population and their distribution in each parish. Results show that the Parish of Paget had the highest proportion at 55.1%, followed by Smith’s at 48.5% and Southampton at 29.8%.

Parish	Population	White (%)
St. George's	1,156	20.4
Hamilton	1,608	28.8
Smith's	2,903	48.5
Devonshire	1,832	25.8
Pembroke	3,029	27.1
Paget	3,252	55.1
Warwick	2,565	28.5
Southampton	1,915	29.8
Sandys	1,206	17.3
Bermuda	19,466	31.0

==== Nativity & Bermudian Status ====
Shows the native and foreign-born status for the white Bermudian population in the 2016 census. Of the 19,466 who identified as white, 62.3% (12,121) were Bermudian citizens and 37.7% non-citizens. Most of the population - 52.7% (10,262) were foreign-born and 47.2% were native born in Bermuda. The majority of those Bermuda-born were citizens with 89.8% (8,261) compared with 10.2% that were non-Bermudian citizens.

Nativity & Bermudian Status	19,466	100.0
Bermudian	12,121	62.3%
Non-Bermudian	7,345	37.7%
Bermuda-born	9,197	47.2%
Bermudian	8,261	42.4%
Non-Bermudian	936	4.8%
Foreign-born	10,262	52.7%
Bermudian	3,859	19.8%
Non-Bermudian	6,403	32.9%
Not Stated	7	0.0%
Bermudian	1	0.0%
Non-Bermudian	6	0.0%

==== 2010 ====
The 2010 Bermudian census showed that White Bermudians accounted for 31% (10% native Bermudians and 21% foreign-born) of the territory's total population, with a further 7% of Bermuda's population self-identifying as being of mixed African and European descent.

=== Birthplace ===
A majority of Bermudians classified as white are foreign-born nationals. The most common place of birth for them are:

- United Kingdom: 3,942 (or 6% of Bermuda's total population)
- United States: 3,424 (6%)
- Canada: 2,235 (4%)
- Azores/Portugal: 1,574 (3%)
- Other countries: 1,125 (2%).

=== Ancestry ===
A question on ancestry was first introduced in the 1991 Bermuda census and asked until 2010. It was omitted from the 2016 census.

== Religion ==
The religious affiliation for white Bermudians according to the 2010 census. Includes 2,551 persons for which there is no data. There is no data for 2016 on religion.

Religious affiliation (2010 census)
Religion	Population	% of white Bermudians
Total	19,926	
Catholic Church	5,666	28.4
Anglican	4,667	23.4
None	4,195	21.0
Presbyterian	1,017	5.1
Non-Denominational	694	3.5
Methodist	506	2.5
Baptist	273	1.4
Lutheran	204	1.0
Seventh-day Adventist	131	0.6
Jehovah's Witness	73	0.4
Pentecostal	47	0.2
Church of God	34	0.2
African Methodist Episcopal	43	0.2
Other	670	3.3
Not Stated	432	2.1

== Notable people ==
- George Starkey (1628–1665), medical practitioner and alchemist (born in Bermuda)
- John Bowen (d. 1704), pirate
- Henry Jennings (d. c. 1745), pirate
- William Eldon Tucker (1872–1953), rugby union player and doctor
- Thomas Melville Dill (1876–1945), soldier, politician, and lawyer
- Guy Pentreath (1902–1985), Anglican clergyman (born in Bermuda)
- Bill Tucker (1903–1991), rugby union player, surgeon, and World War II veteran
- Ernest DeCouto (1926–2017), politician and former Speaker of the House
- Nora Sayre (1932–2001), film critic and historian (born in Bermuda)
- Ann Cartwright DeCouto (c. 1941–2016), politician, former Deputy Premier of Bermuda
- Clarence Parfitt (born 1944), cricket player
- David Hemp (born 1970), cricket player and coach
- Lena Headey (born 1973), actress (born in Bermuda)
- Flora Duffy (born 1987), triathlete, first ever Olympic gold medalist for Bermuda
- B. Dylan Hollis (born 1995), social media personality
- Logan Jiménez (born 2008), footballer

== See also ==
- British Overseas Territories
- Bahamians
- Portuguese people
- White Caribbeans
- British people
- White people
