= Black Bermudians =

Bermudians with Black African ancestry

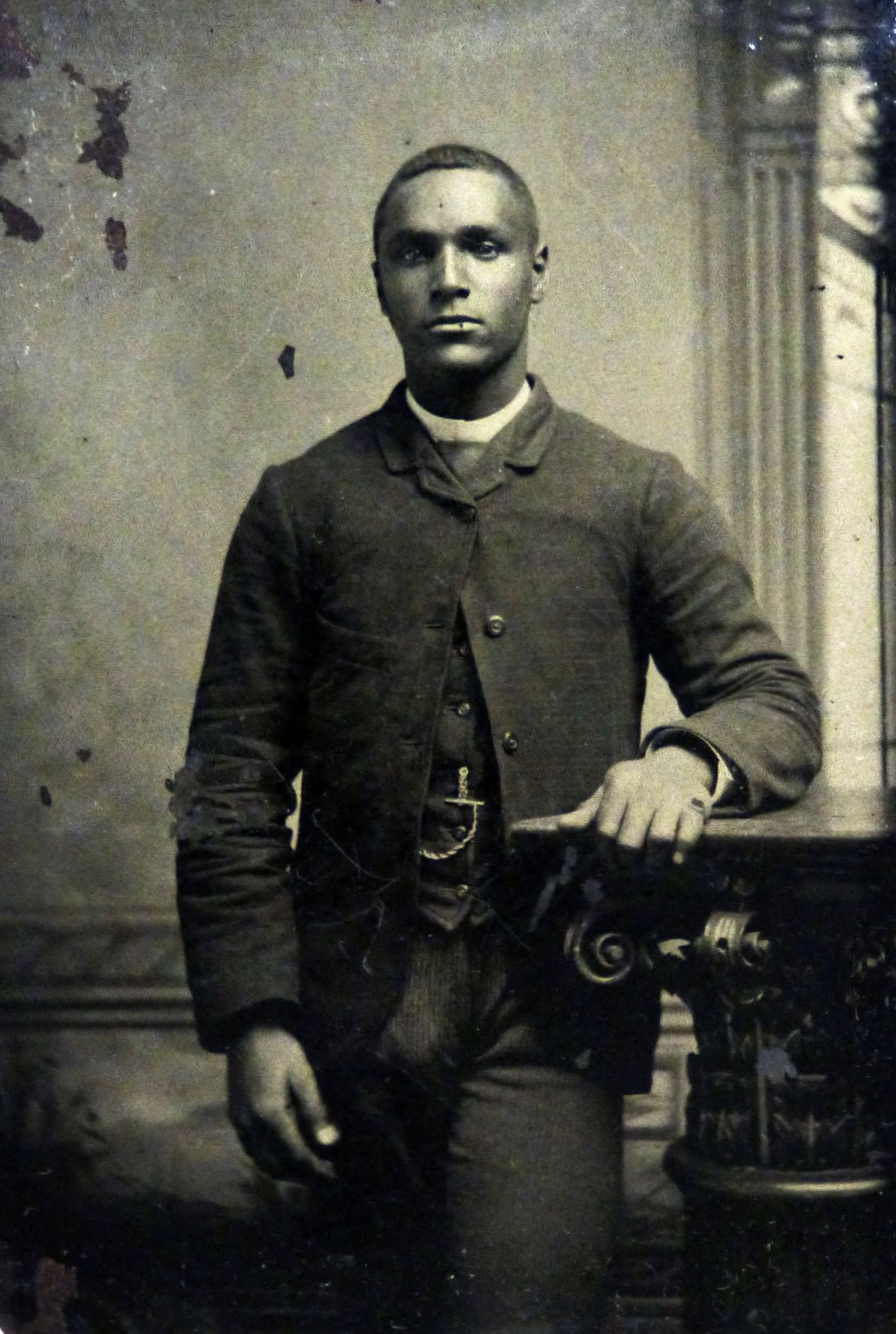
- 19th-century young Bermudian man

Total population
- Black Bermudian; 37,500 – 45,000; Ancestral Diaspora; 60,000 – 80,000

Regions with significant populations
- Bermuda (UK); Approx. 37,500
- United States
- United Kingdom
- Canada
- Turks and Caicos Islands (UK)^{a}
- Bahamas^{a}: ~10,000^{b}

Languages
- Bermudian English

Religion
- Christianity

Related ethnic groups
- • Afro–Latin Americans • English people • African people • African Americans • Afro-Caribbean • Afro-Bahamian • Portuguese people • Afro-Portuguese people • Indigenous peoples of the Americas
- ^{a} Ancestral Diaspora^{b} Estimated aboriginal population All population figures are estimates

Black Bermudians, African Bermudians, Afro-Bermudians or Bermudians of African descent, are Bermudians with any appreciable Black African ancestry. The population descends from Africans who arrived in Bermuda during the 17th century as indentured servants and slaves, mostly via Spanish, or former Spanish, territories or Spanish and other ships wrecked at Bermuda or captured by Bermuda-based privateers.

== History ==
The first influx of blacks in any numbers came in the mid-17th century, when free blacks, most presumably Spanish-speaking Catholics, chose to immigrate to the Bermuda from former Spanish West Indian colonies that were captured by England and incorporated into its growing empire. As with most of the white settlers, few could afford the cost of their transport and so arrived as indentured servants. The continued reliance upon indentured servitude until the dissolution of the Somers Isles Company in 1684 meant that Bermuda's economy did not come to rely on slavery during the 17th century. Black and Native American slaves continued to trickle in Bermuda, however, due to privateers using the colony as a base of operations (Bermuda's utility as a base for his privateers having attracted Robert Rich, 2nd Earl of Warwick, to become one of the major shareholders of the Somers Isles Company and the namesake of Warwick Parish). Black and Native American slaves captured aboard enemy ships were considered property, and returned to Bermuda for sale along with ships and cargoes. Bermuda was also used as a dumping ground for peoples ethnically-cleansed from their homelands by the expanse of the English Empire. This included particularly Algonquian peoples from New England, such as Pequots and Wampanoags, and native Irish Gaels, following the Cromwellian conquest of Ireland. All of these peoples were shipped to Bermuda and sold into bondage. Whites (excluding the Irish) remained the majority in Bermuda at the end of the 17th century. Although fears of blacks and Irish especially led to the discouragement of black immigration, the prohibition of the importation of Irish, and continual efforts to encourage slave-owners to export their slaves and free non-whites to emigrate or risk enslavement, the blacks, Irish, Native Americans, and some part of the white Anglos merged into a single demographic during the course of the 18th century which was known as coloured (anyone who was not entirely white).

Intermarriage and extramarital relationships between the coloured and white populations continued to shift the ratio of coloured to white Bermudians as a child of a coloured and a white parent was generally considered coloured. By the 19th century the coloured population surpassed the white population and became Bermuda's largest ethnic group. As in the United States and Britain, the term "coloured" came to be seen as offensive in Bermuda by the mid-20th century and fell out of official use. It has been replaced by the terms "Black" and sometimes "African-Bermudian". The small numbers of Asians and other non-African minorities in Bermuda had always been included in the "coloured" demographic, but are now listed separately. Portuguese immigration since the 1840s has contributed to 10% of the current population (although Portuguese have historically been defined as a separate racial demographic group from both white and coloured Bermudians), but with only those of entirely-European extraction being considered white and anyone with any black ancestry considered black, and with considerable black immigration from the West Indies during the course of the 20th century, blacks have remained in the majority since the 19th century.

Currently, Bermuda's largest demographic group is black, accounting for 54% of the territory's population.

== Source populations and genetic research ==
The founder population that settled in Bermuda between 1609 and the 1630s was almost entirely English. Typical Bermudian surnames that date to the Seventeenth Century indicate that the primary area of England from which settlers were sourced during that period was East Anglia and neighbouring regions. Examples include Ingham, from Ingham, Lincolnshire, and Trimingham, from the village of Trimingham in Norfolk. This ancestry is shared today by both white and black Bermudians (the latter demographic group, as noted above, being made up of individuals of a blend of mostly African, with smaller amounts of European and Native American ancestry to various degrees). A continuous inward flow of immigrants from other parts of the British Isles, other British (or formerly British) territories, and foreign countries has added to the population over the centuries, including sustained immigration from Portuguese Atlantic islands from the 1840s, and numerous Royal Navy and British Army personnel who were discharged and remained in Bermuda to contribute to the permanent population (white and multi-racial). Since the Second World War, Bermuda's rapid development as a centre of international business has attracted many immigrants, primarily whites from Britain and North America, while many whites from Europe and elsewhere have also been attracted by work in hotels, restaurants and other areas. Most recently, immigration from the Indian sub-continent and Asia (or of persons of such descent) have been a growing segment of the population. The white population (that is, those Bermudians presumed to be entirely of European ancestry) has consequently grown more diverse. As many of these immigrants have intermarried with black Bermudians, also, they have also contributed to the diversity of black Bermudians. Although black immigration was long discouraged, immigration by blacks from the British West Indies has been sustained since the start of the 20th century. Despite the high level of immigration sustained over the last century, the largest part of Bermuda's ancestry dates to the 17th-century founder population. No genetic study has as yet been conducted either of or including the white population of Bermuda. Although European ancestry is the largest component of Bermuda's ancestry, and those entirely of European ancestry are by far the largest mono-racial group (based on actual ancestry, rather than self-identification), whites (and the European ancestry of blacks) are often excluded when Bermuda's source populations are discussed. By example, National Geographic's Genographic Project Reference Population (Geno 2.0 Next Generation) for "Bermudian" (as of 28 June 2020) was described on its website (which was taken offline after 30 June 2020) as "based on samples collected from mixed populations living in Bermuda" (this was not based on a survey of even the mixed, or other-than-entirely-European population, of Bermuda, as no such survey of all of Bermuda has been carried out).

In the British West Indian islands (and also in the southern continental colonies that were to become states of the United States of America), the majority of enslaved blacks brought across the Atlantic came from West Africa (roughly between modern Senegal and Ghana). By contrast, very little of Bermuda's original black emigration came (directly or indirectly) from this area. The first blacks to arrive in Bermuda in any numbers were free blacks who came in the mid-17th century from Spanish-speaking areas of the West Indies, and most of the remainder were enslaved Latin American blacks and recently enslaved Africans captured from the Spanish by Bermudian privateers or survivors of shipwrecks. As Spain and Portugal sourced most of their slaves from South-West Africa (the Portuguese through ports in modern-day Angola; the Spanish purchased most of their African slaves from Portuguese traders, and from Arabs whose slave trading was centered in Zanzibar).

This history has been well understood from the written record, and was confirmed in 2009 by the only genetic survey of Bermuda, which looked exclusively at the black population of St. David's Island (as the purpose of the study was to seek Native American haplogroups, which could be assumed to be absent from the white population) consequently showed that the African ancestry of black Bermudians (other than those resulting from recent immigration from the British West Indian islands) is largely from a band across southern Africa, from Angola to Mozambique, which is similar to what is revealed in Latin America, but distinctly different from the blacks of the British West Indies and the United States.

68% of the mtDNA (maternal) lineages of the black islanders were found to be African, with the two most common being L0a and L3e, which are sourced from populations spread from Central-West to South-East Africa. These lineages represent less than 5% of the mtDNA lineages of blacks in the United States and the English-speaking West Indies. They are, however, common in Brazil and the Spanish-speaking countries of Latin America. L3e, by example, is typical of !Kung-speaking populations of the Kalahari, as well as of parts of Mozambique and Nigeria. The modern nation where it represents the highest percentage of the population is actually Brazil, where it represents 21% of mtDNA lineages. 31% of the mtDNA lineages of blacks in Bermuda are West Eurasian (European), with J1c being the most common. 1% were Native American.

For NRY (paternal) haplogroups among black Bermudians, the study found about a third were made up of three African ones (of which E1b1a, the most common NRY haplogroup in West and Central African populations, "accounted for the vast majority of the African NRY samples (83%)"), with the remainder (about 64.79%) being West Eurasian excepting one individual (1.88%) with a Native American NRY haplogroup Q1a3a. Of the individuals with European NRY haplogroups, more than half had R1b1b2, which is common in Europe and is found at frequencies over 75% in England and Wales. None of these percentages can be taken as equivalent to the percentage of ancestry in the black population from the specific regions as genetic drift tends to erase minority haplogroups over generations. This explains the near absence of Native American haplogroups despite the hundreds of Native Americans known to have been involuntarily brought to Bermuda in the 17th century.
