= Arthur Bluck =

Bermudian judge and politician

The Honourable Arthur Bluck OBE

46th Speaker of the House of Assembly of Bermuda
- In office 1929–1933
- Monarch: George V
- Governor: Sir Louis Jean Bols; Sir Thomas Astley Cubitt
- Preceded by: Sir Reginald Gray
- Succeeded by: Sir J. Reginald Conyers

Member of the Colonial Parliament of Bermuda (House of Assembly)

Assistant Judge of the Supreme Court of Bermuda

Mayor of Hamilton, Bermuda
- In office 1932–1932

Personal details
- Born: Arthur William Bluck; 6 March 1864 Hamilton, Bermuda
- Died: June 1944 (aged 80) Hamilton, Bermuda
- Spouse: Mary Outerbridge
- Relations: Henry Hamilton Kitchener (son-in-law)
- Children: 4
- Occupation: Politician

Arthur William Bluck OBE (6 March 1864 – June 1944) was a Bermudan judge and politician who served as a member of the House of Assembly and an Assistant Justice of the Supreme Court of Bermuda. He was Speaker of the Colonial Parliament of Bermuda between 1929 and 1933.

Bluck was Mayor of Hamilton since 1913 and involved with the Trade Development Board (TDB). He was president of the Bank of Bermuda. He was also president of the Bermuda Fire and Marine Insurance Company.
