= HMS Wanderer =

HMS Wanderer may refer to one of seven Royal Navy ships of that name.

- HMS Wanderer (1806) was a sixth-rate 20-gun ship launched in 1806 and sold in 1817. Made one voyage as a whaling ship between 1817 and 1820. Then sailed as a merchantman trading with North America. Last listed in 1827; abandoned as waterlogged off Newfoundland on 28 October 1827.
- HMS Wanderer (1835) was a 16-gun brig-sloop launched in 1835 and disposed of in 1850.
- HMS Wanderer (1855) was a 5-gun gunvessel launched in 1855 and disposed of in 1866.
- HMS Wanderer (1883) was a sail training brig launched in 1883 and disposed of in 1907.
- HMS Wanderer was a paddle steamer/mine sweeper built in 1906 with the previous names Roslin Castle, Lady Margaret and Liberty, bought by the Royal Navy in 1908, named Wanderer in 1913 and renamed Roamer in 1919
- HMS Wanderer (D74) was an Admiralty modified W-class destroyer launched in 1919 and disposed of in 1946.
