= List of speakers of the House of Assembly of Bermuda =

This is a list of speakers of the House of Assembly of Bermuda:

Name	Entered office	Left office	Sources
Roger Wood	1622	1629	
Anthony Jenour Sen.	1629	1632	
Thomas Stokes	1632	1636	
Josias Ffoster	1637	1641	
Henry Smith	1643	1646	
Charles Wheterhall	1646		
John Vaughn	1646	1651	
Henry Tucker (Secretary)	1658	1661	
Charles Wheterhall	1662	1663	
Cornelius White	1671	1676	
John Tucker (Secretary)	1682	1685	
Thomas Richards	1685	1688	
John Gilbert	1696		
Charles Walker & Anthony White	1696	1697	
Francis Jones	1698	1700	
John Brooke	1701	1703	
Francis Jones	1703	1707	
John Dickinson	1707	1710	
William Tucker	1710	1715	
Robert Burton	1715		
John Jennings	1715	1722	
Thomas Parsons	1722	1723	
Jonathan Outerbridge	1723	1725	
Perient Trott	1726	1728	
Thomas Smith	1728	1729	
Perient Trott	1729	1732	
Nathaniel Bascome	1732	1735	
Perient Trott	1736		
Nathaniel Bascome	1737		
Perient Trott	1737	1739	
Henry Tucker	1739		
Thomas Gilbert	1740		
James Tauncey	1742		
Samuel Trott	1747	1748	
Conelius Hinson	1748	1789	
Copeland Stiles	1785	1789	
James Tucker	1789	1792	
Nathaniel Butterfield	1792	1793	
James Tucker	1793	1808	
John Noble Harvey	1811	1846	
Alexander Ewing	1846	1864	
George Somers Tucker	1864	1874	
Samuel Saltus Ingham	1874	1895	
Sir Thomas J. Wadson	1895	1921	
Sir Reginald Gray	1923	1929	
Arthur William Bluck	1929	1933	
Sir J. Reginald Conyers	1933	1948	
Sir John W. Cox	1948	1968	
Lt. Col. Sir Jeffrey Astwood	1968	1972	
Sir Dudley Spurling	1972	1976	
Lawrence P. Gutteridge	1976	1979	
F. John Barritt	1979	1989	
David E. Wilkinson	1989	1993	
Ernest D. DeCouto	1993	1998	
Stanley W. Lowe	1998	2012	
K.H. Randolph Horton	2013	2017	
Dennis Lister	2017	present	
