= Reginald Conyers =

Sir Reginald Conyers
Personal information
- Full name: James Reginald Conyers
- Born: 3 September 1879; Pembroke Parish, Bermuda
- Died: 26 July 1948 (aged 68); Boston, Massachusetts, United States

Domestic team information
- Years: Team
- 1909: Gentlemen of Philadelphia

Career statistics
Competition	First-class
Matches	3
Runs scored	258
Batting average	51.60
100s/50s	1/0
Top score	149
Catches/stumpings	0/-
- Source: CricketArchive, 24 November 2012

Sir James Reginald Conyers CBE (3 September 1879 – 26 July 1948) was a Bermudian lawyer, politician, and cricketer. Born in Pembroke Parish, Bermuda, Conyers was a keen member of the Hamilton Cricket Club, and toured the United States with the club in 1905. Having regularly played for Bermuda against touring American teams, he was invited to play for the Gentlemen of Philadelphia during the team's 1908–09 tour of Jamaica. In the final match of the tour, against Jamaica at Melbourne Park, Conyers scored 149 runs opening Philadelphia's batting, his highest first-class score and only first-class century. He would later make several appearances for Philadelphia's Merion Cricket Club in the Halifax Cup competition in 1909 and 1911. Conyers remained heavily involved in Bermudian cricket after the tour's end, often captaining the Bermudan national team against touring sides from North America. He was playing competitive cricket until as late as 1928, when he captained Bermuda on a tour of the United States aged 49.

After the conclusion of the First World War, Conyers established a law firm based in Hamilton, and in 1928 merged his firm with that of Nicholas Dill and James Pearman, forming the law firm of Conyers Dill & Pearman. Conyers was made a Commander of the Order of the British Empire in 1936, and a knight bachelor in 1944, for "services to Bermuda". He served in the House of Assembly from the 1930s, and served for a period of time as Speaker. Conyers also chaired a committee attempting to implement conscription during the Second World War. He died in Boston, Massachusetts, in July 1948.
