= Ernest DeCouto =

Speaker of the House of Assembly of Bermuda

Ernest D. DeCouto CBE

Speaker of the House of Assembly of Bermuda
- In office 1993–1998

Personal details
- Born: 1926
- Died: 2017 (aged 90–91)
- Party: United Bermuda Party
- Occupation: Politician

Ernest D. DeCouto CBE (1926–2017) was a politician from Bermuda. He served as Speaker of the House of Assembly of Bermuda from 1993 to 1998.

== Early life ==
DeCouto was of Portuguese descent. He was educated at the Whitney Institute, Gilbert Institute, Warwick Academy, and Bermuda Commercial School. He joined the Department of Agriculture in 1943, and later worked for Master's Ltd., Colonial Airlines, Eastern Air Lines, and Rego Ltd., a real estate firm. In 1960, DeCouto established his own real estate company, DeCouto and Dunstan Real Estate. He served as president until his retirement in 1992.

== Politics ==
After serving on the Smith's Parish council, DeCouto was elected to the House of Assembly at the 1972 general election, winning the Smith's North constituency for the United Bermuda Party (UBP). He was appointed Minister of Youth and Sport in 1981, under Premier David Gibbons. In the subsequent cabinet after John Swan was appointed Premier, he was again appointed Minister of Youth and Sport. DeCouto was elected Deputy Speaker in 1989 and Speaker in 1993, the first such officeholder of Portuguese descent. His appointment as speaker in early November was considered notable as he defeated the ruling party UBP's candidate David Dyer, the former government whip. He retired from politics in 1998. According to John Barritt, DeCouto "had a very good grasp of the rules of parliamentary procedure and prided himself on keeping abreast of rulings and interpretations throughout the Caribbean, in particular, and the Commonwealth generally". Michael Dunkley said "as a Speaker he was first class — he ran a very good House [...] he ran a very direct debate and was extremely fair".

== See also ==
- List of speakers of the House of Assembly of Bermuda
