= Music of the Virgin Islands =

The music of the Virgin Islands reflects long-standing West Indian cultural ties to the island nations to the south, the islands' African heritage and European colonial history, as well as recent North American influences. Though the United States Virgin Islands and British Virgin Islands are politically separate, they maintain close cultural ties. From its neighbours, the Virgin Islands has imported various pan-Caribbean genres of music, including calypso music and soca music from Trinidad and reggae from Jamaica.

The major indigenous form of music is the scratch band (also called ''Fungi band'' in the British Virgin Islands), which use improvised instruments like gourds and washboards to make a kind of music called ''Quelbe''. A Virgin Island folk song called 'cariso is also popular, as well as St. Thomas' bamboula. The quadrille is the traditional folk dance of the islands, and include varieties like St. Croix's Imperial Quadrille and St. Thomas' Flat German Quadrille. The Heritage Dancers are a respected dance troupe that perform traditional folk dances from the Virgin Islands and beyond.

== Characteristics ==
Virgin Islander culture is syncretic, based primarily on African, European and North American cultures. Though the Danish controlled the present-day US Virgin Islands for many years, the dominant language has been an English-based Creole since the 19th century, and the islands remain much more receptive to English language popular culture than any other. The Dutch, the French and the Danish also contributed elements to the island's culture, as have immigrants from the Arab world, India and other Caribbean islands. The single largest influence on modern Virgin Islander culture, however, comes from the Africans enslaved to work in canefields from the 17th to the mid-19th century. These African slaves brought with them traditions from across a wide swathe of Africa, including what is now Nigeria, Senegal, both Congos, Gambia and Ghana.

== Folk music ==
Virgin Islander folk music has declined since the mid-20th century, though some traditions, such as scratch bands, remain vibrant. Trends that contributed to this change include the rise of the tourism industry, the switch of American tourists from Cuba to the Virgin Islands following the 1959 revolution, and the growth of industries based on mass radio, television and recorded music. These changes "(diluted) local traditions and (diverted) younger generations" from becoming involved in folk music, because popular styles came to be viewed as having more prestige, class and income.

=== Scratch bands and fungi music ===
Scratch bands, also known as fungi bands and formerly string bands, are a distinctive form of folk ensemble; they have survived the decline of other Virgin Islander folk traditions, through adapting to newly imported instrumentation and songs, and becoming a part of a more general revival of interest in folk culture on the islands. The name scratch band may derive from the sound produced by scraping the squash, an instrument similar to the Puerto Rican guiro, but larger, or from the word squash itself, used to refer to the bands first by American visitors and then by locals.

The traditional scratch band ensemble varied, but always used a percussive instrument, either the squash, tambourine, or a local form of double-headed barrel drum similar to the Dominican tambora, as well as an accordion, cane flute or violin as a melodic instrument. String instruments were also common, including the banjo, ukulele or a six-string guitar. The ass pipe, made out of a car exhaust tube, often provided the bass, and was played similar to the tuba. Since about the 1980s, the instrumentation for scratch bands became more rigid. The alto saxophone became the most common melodic instrument, replaced sometimes by a silver flute. Conga drums, squash, electric guitar or bass guitar, and a steel (a triangle). Banjo or ukulele, keyboard and additional saxophones or other melodic instruments are more rarely found in modern bands.

The music of scratch bands are a type of folk music that dates back to the days of slavery. The slaves on the islands used everyday objects to fashion instruments. However, this was not unique to slaves as individuals like James "Jamesie" Brewster, considered by many as the King of Scratch in the Virgin Islands, recalls making his first banjo from an old sardine can, old white pine wood, and an old sack of flour to make twine. Lyrics traditionally function as oral history, spreading news and gossip. Modern scratch bands play a wide range of dances, including calypsos, boleros, quadrilles, international pop songs, merengues, mazurkas, waltzes, jigs and other styles. They perform at church services, private parties, public festivals, local dances and fairs, christenings and weddings, and also perform for tourists. The scratch band tradition remains most vibrant on St. Croix, where the bands Bully & the Kafooners, Stanley & the Ten Sleepless Knights, and Blinky & the Roadmasters are well known. Scratch bands are less common on St. Thomas, and in the British Virgin Islands, though the popular Elmo & the Sparkplugs hail from Tortola.

=== Quelbe ===
Quelbe is a form of topical folk song, and is the official music of the US Virgin Islands. Quelbe is commonly performed by scratch bands, Stanley & the Ten Sleepless Knights being the most popular throughout the Virgin Islands, though their folk origin lies in individuals, who sang the songs in informal settings, celebrations and festivals. The music in most cases involved true stories where the listeners can identify events that happen throughout a timeline. These songs typically contained sexual innuendos and double entendres, as well as other hidden meanings; common topics included political events, such as a boycott. One example from the early 20th century chastises a carousel owner for opposing a wage increase:

I rather walk and drink rum whole night
Before me go ride on LaBega Carousel
I rather walk, man, and drink rum whole night
Before me go ride on LaBega Carousel
You no hear what LaBega say
"The people no worth fifteen cent a day"
You no hear what LaBega say, man
"The people no worth more than half cent a day"

=== Other folk styles ===
The quadrille is a folk dance that was formerly an important part of Virgin Islands culture; it is now rarely performed, except on St. Croix. There, locals dance the quadrille at public performance venues, such as St. Gerard's Hall, or as educational spectacles for schools, festivals and holidays, or as entertainment for tourists. Educational and entertainment quadrille troops both wear traditionally styled clothing reminiscent of authentic attire.

The Virgin Islands tea meetings, the David and Goliath play and masquerade jig all probably derive from elsewhere in the Caribbean. The masquerade jig uses elements of theatre, dance, music and oratory, and functions as simple entertainment with improvised jigs alternated with humorous monologues. Tea meetings are now only performed as reconstructions in folkloric ensembles; they were evenings of speech-making, feasting and the singing of hymns and parlor songs. The David and Goliath play features music, dance, theatre, and dramatic and witty speeches, all based on the biblical story of David and Goliath.

The Afro-Virgin Islander bamboula tradition is now only performed in a reconstructed fashion. It was a style of song, drumming and folk dance, performed by two drummers on one drum; one drum used his hands and heel, and the other two sticks. African-styled dance and group song with refrains were a constant part, with verses frequently improvised by a soloist.

Traditional Virgin Islander folk music festivals were performed until the late 1950s. Masquerading (mas'ing) was an important tradition, and consisted of groups wearing theme-based costumes, and playing melodies and rhythms that suggest their identity. Instruments included a fife-and-drum ensemble that featured a cane fife, double-headed bass drum (known as keg or boom-boom) and snare drum (known as kettledrum).

The Virgin Islander cariso tradition is extinct in a true folk context, but remains an important symbol of Crucian culture, and is performed by folkloric ensembles for educational and holiday events. Carisos were still performed as late as the 1990s by several elderly singers, most famously Ethel McIntosh and Leona Watson. Though similar in some ways to quelbe, cariso is more African in its melodic style, frequent sustained syllables and traditional performance context, namely women singing in groups in call-and-response. Carisos, like quelbe, commemorate historical events, and spread news and opinions about important issues. One particularly famous cariso dates to 1848, and documents the emancipation of the slaves; the first segment is the refrain, sung by a chorus, which is followed by a verse performed by a soloist singer:

Clear the road, all you clear the road, Clear the road, let the slave them pass, We a go for a-we freedom.

Hardship in the morning, suffering at night. No one ever help us, it is only Father Ryan. They bring we ya from Africa, that we bornin' land; Bring we ya in slavery, in the land of Santa Cruz.

== The French Virgin Islander ==
In the early 1900s, small groups left the small French island of St. Barths and travelled to St. Thomas, VI in search of work. Known throughout St. Thomas as "Frenchies" many played instruments such as the accordion, harmonica, ukulele and guitar and made instruments such as the "Weero or Guiros" out of dried squash from their farms and cowbells from their livestock. Cyril Querrard of the Mountain Kings Band was a pioneer in promoting the music and sound of the French Virgin Islander. He had his own weekend show at the "Luau Club" on St. Thomas where he sang and played guitar for military personnel, tourists and locals alike. Because he lived on the peak of the island, he was once introduced as "The King of the Mountain" and the "Mountain Kings" band was later formed. Other local French descent bands later followed, such as, The Originals, Obsession Band and the Under Pressure band. These bands continued to have this unique sound as a result of this mix of cultures.

Shawn Querrard, lead singer of the Obsession band and son of Cyril Querrard, is known for his song writing ability. Songs like "Gypsy Girl", "Cherry tree", "Chances", "I had to let you know" and "Music Medicine" has proven longevity and popularity in many of the Caribbean islands, particularly those of French influence.

== Modern and recently imported styles ==
Until the mid-20th century, the Virgin Islands were largely culturally isolated from international popular music. In the 1960s, a growth in tourism caused an influx of immigrants to fill the service positions the tourism industry created. These immigrants brought with them many styles of popular music, which were popularised by the growth of mass media in the islands, including television and radio.

By the 1980s, Virgin Islands was home to many imported styles, especially salsa, reggae, soca, merengue and rock. Jazz, Western classical music and musical theatre, along with international pop stars, were common mainstream interests, while the islands' youth formed bands and dance troupes that played styles popular across the Caribbean, mainly Latin, Jamaican and Trinidadian influenced, such as salsa, reggae, steelpan and soca. The large Puerto Rican population in the Virgin Islands kept popular music from Puerto Rico and the Dominican Republic a major part of the islands' industry.

=== Calypso ===
The first calypso star from the Virgin Islands was Lloyd "Prince" Thomas, who moved to New York City in the mid-1940s and continued performing for some twenty years. Charles Harris, the Mighty Zebra (a well-known Trinidadian calypsonian) influentially performed in the Virgin Islands in the 1950s; he came for the Carnival in 1952, and stayed, playing at the Virgin Isles Hotel with the LaMotta Brothers Band. The LaMotta Band, led by Bill LaMotta, was a very popular group that recorded several albums and backed Mighty Zebra on a 1957 album for RCA Records. The remaining major early calypso band from the Virgin Islands was the Fabulous McClevertys, who toured widely across the East Coast of the United States at the height of the calypso craze in the late 1950s.

Another popular Virgin Islands calypsonian is Irvin "Brownie" Brown, who has hosted the islands' Carnival and has been a leading singer, radio entertainer, MC and drummer for many years. Originally from St. Thomas, he learned the timbales as a young man, and joined his uncle's hotel band in 1949 or 1950. The band soon began performing in Florida and elsewhere, and Brownie became known as a calypso singer while also learning bongos, congas and a trap set. They recorded for Monogram and then Art Records, with Mighty Panther and the Haitian singer Calypso Mama. Brownie's return to St. Thomas was followed by joining up with Milo & the Kings, a well-known band, for whom he was a percussion for seventeen years, recording a number of albums and touring across North America and the Caribbean. He began working as a DJ for the WSTA radio station in 1966, and continued for more than three decades; he had a regular talk show with calypso performances, The Original Side of Walter and Brownie.

==== Salsa ====
In the 1950s through present day Milo and the Kings (Emile Francis – music director) kept Latin music alive, especially on St. Thomas. Milo and the Kings were famous for playing with such famous bands as El Gran Combo (Rafael Ithier – music director and Salsa Maestro to Milo), Tito Puente, Joe Cuba, Mongo Santa María, to name a few. Present day Milo's Kings sometimes attempt to honour Milo with Salsa. In 1998 Puerto Rico became the birthplace of Reggaeton music, a mix of Reggae and Latin music combined with Spanish Rap & Reggae. Prominent Reggaeton Artist from the Virgin Islands include Kamakazi, Nicky Jam, Nene Ganja, Panty Man.

=== Soca ===
The Virgin Islands has been home to a number of well-known soca bands. Among the oldest and most respected are: Milo & The Kings, Mandingo Brass, Imaginations Brass, & Eddie & the Movements (later renamed the "Awesome JamBand").

The "Jam Band" (formerly Eddie & the Movements) are 20 time Road March Champions. The original "Jam Band" slowed up with the death of the band's main front man Nick 'Daddy' Friday who died in 2005. The Enforcements band hailed out of Monbijou, St. Croix (many members branched out to form different bands).

The Imaginations Brass was the first group to incorporate the used of electronic drums & keyboard sequencers into their music. They started the trend & other groups (such as Seventeen Plus & the JamBand) later advanced the technique. It demonstrated the full use of the drum machines, electronic keyboards, vocals, and a bass line working together to set a new standard for Caribbean Music.

Other popular bands included: Seventeen Plus (17+); VIO International; Xpress Band (St. Croix Festival's 2006–2007 Roadmarch Champions); Starlites; P'your Passion Band; Xtaushun Band (St. Croix Festival two-time Road March Champions)."; Fusion Band(St. Croix Festival four-time Road March Champions); DJATC (Daddy Jones And The Crew); the Jammerz HP (formerly known as JDPP Jammerz); De Fabulous Stroka Band; Hyvoltage Band; Code 9; Xpress Band; Jam Tyme; UMB Soldiers; Rupsion Band; Spectrum Band (St. Thomas Carnival four-time Road March Champions); Kylo & Stylee Band; and Pumpa & The Unit have also made names for themselves.

There is also the 5X Road March Champs Virgin Islands Based Entertainment [VIBE] out of the Virgin Islands, British to be exact. They are known for popular hit songs: Take Over, #Rule #Uno, Rock With Me, Jouvert Feeling, Speed Bumps, Dancing, Don't Catch No Feelings, Tuck and Roll, Hello, Flashlights, Show Me, One [Jougo, MacDaddy, TeeJaay, Ramon, Glenn, Zo, Tafari, Smudge] Management: Roger Frank @ 1 284 541 0546. To all our Fans, WE love ayo bad. Love Alone!!

=== Reggae ===
A reggae scene has been flourishing in the Virgin Islands, especially the island of St. Croix. The Virgin Islands reggae scene has achieved much popularity throughout the Lesser Antilles, Puerto Rico, the United States, South America, Europe, and Africa. Prominent reggae artists from the Virgin Islands include Pressure, Midnite, Dezarie, Army, Abja, De Apostle, Niyorah, Emanuel, Bambu Station, Inner Visions, Sabbattical Ahdah, Eno, Revalation, Iba Wicked, Jah Rubal, Jah Croix, Exodus and many more. The reggae music of St. Croix has a distinct "roots" feeling and is strongly rooted in Rastafari. A prominent known reggae label in St. Croix is I Grade Records, who have released countless Midnite releases, two Dezarie albums, Niyorah albums, Army albums and Abja albums. Bambu Station guitarist Tuff Lion, along with Laurent Alfred of I Grade Records produce many of the tracks.

St. Croix also boasts a reggae radio station, WSTX 100.3 FM, which features Virgin Islands reggae.

=== Band music ===
European-based military band music first came to the Virgin Islands through ship-based bands as well as the small military ensembles of the Danish troops based in the islands. Regular band concerts were given by Danish musicians in Charlotte Amalie at least as early as 1888 at the Emancipation Garden bandstand. The Native Brass Band, reportedly the first official band of local musicians, was formed under the direction of Lionel Roberts in 1907, while the Adams Juvenile Band appeared in 1910 and would be inducted into the US Navy when the service took over the administration of the islands from Denmark in 1917. The induction of this all-black unit into the US Navy was remarkable for its time and thus recognised the first black musicians in the US Navy since the War of 1812. The United States Navy Band of the Virgin Islands gave regular public concerts on St. Thomas until the departure of the naval administration in 1931, and not long after its founding two additional navy band units were stationed on St. Croix. Alton Augustus Adams Sr., the founder of the Juvenile Band and the bandmaster of the Navy ensemble, also wrote the Virgin Islands March (1919), now the official territorial anthem of the Virgin Islands, as well as The Governor's Own, the official march of the Virgin Islands Governor. With the exception of a single surviving bamboula arrangement, Adams's marches are entirely in the standard American march style of his idol, John Philip Sousa.

=== Hip-hop ===
There has been the development of a hip-hop scene in the Virgin Islands, specifically on the islands of St. Croix, St. Thomas, and Tortola. There is also a burgeoning hip-hop scene among Virgin Islands artists in the Atlanta metropolitan area. Prominent Virgin Islands hip-hop artists include Iyaz from Tortola, Rock City, Verse Simmonds from St. Thomas, K'Are from Tortola, Virgin Islands, British of the CB 4 Lyfe camp who also does Solo but is still a member of CB and the VI centered hip hop group Dem Rude Boyz.

== Institutions and festivals ==
The two most prominent music institutions in the Virgin Islands are the Island Center (on St. Croix) and the Reichold Center (on St. Thomas). Both these centers provide a venue for concerts of Western classical music, jazz, musical theatre and international pop stars. St. Croix is also home to a public performance venue in St. Gerald's Hall in Frederiksted, where locals dance quadrilles and otherwise perform.

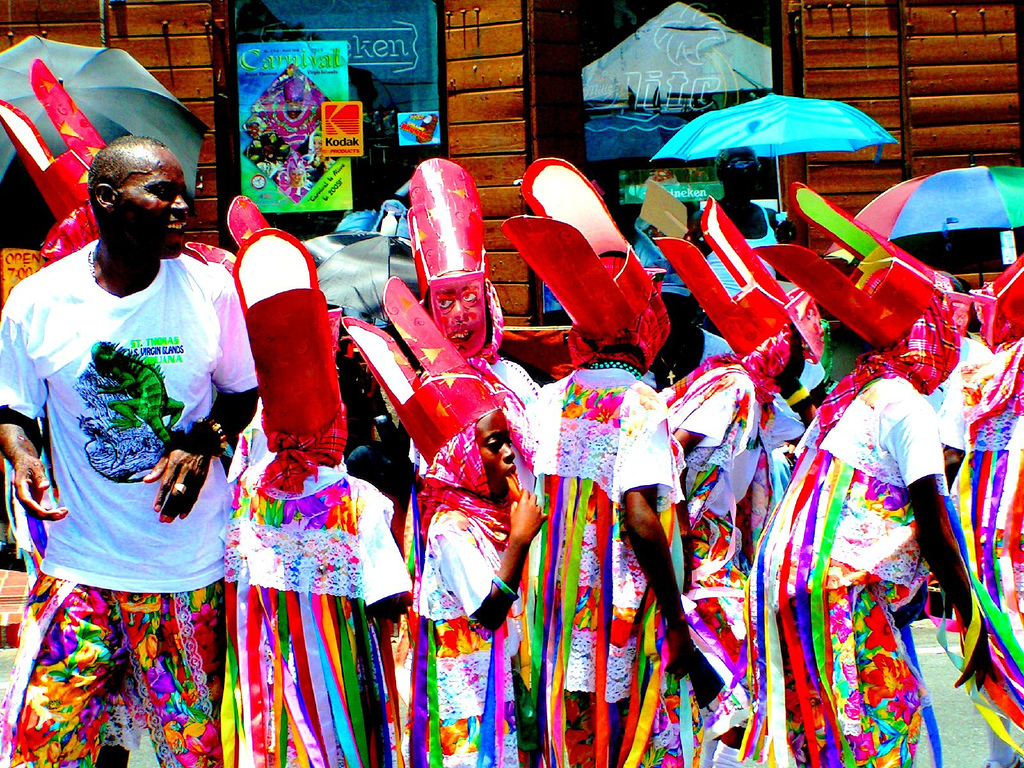
A St. Thomas Carnival troupe

Traditional Virgin Islander folk music festivals were performed until the late 1950s, and featured costumed masquerading. With the advent of formal parades and village festivals, local folk traditions declined, replaced by pan-Caribbean elements like calypso, moko jumbie stilt dancers and visiting performers from other islands.

== Education ==
There are Virgin Islander institutions that support and promote the islands' folk heritage. Bradley Christian's St. Croix Heritage Dancers, for example, are folkloric group, one of several quadrille ensembles that offer a "compact, staged rendition" of folk traditions, along with educational narration.

Music education in the Virgin Islands is focused primarily on the Western classical tradition, particularly orchestral and concert band music. Local folk music is also a part of the music curriculum; quadrilles are taught in schools in St. Croix, and Charlotte Amalie High School on St. Thomas is home to a well-known student scratch band.

== Historiography and musicology ==
There is a paucity of historical documentation and musicological research and analysis of Virgin Islander music. The sound recordist Mary Jane Soule and ethnomusicologist Margot Lieth-Philipp collaborated on an annotated CD, Zoop Zoop Zoop: Traditional Music and Folklore of St. Croix, St. Thomas, and St. John; these liner notes are among the comprehensive descriptions of folk music known. Lieth-Phillipp has also published some other material, on bamboula (which she refers to as a "forgotten" style of Caribbean music) and other topics. The loca and the Smithsonian Institution have also documented some folk traditions, but their research remains largely unpublished. Carmen Nibbs-O'Garra, wife of well-known Antiguan calypsonian Figgy, is the author of In de Calypso Tent, which, though perhaps no longer available, contains information of calypso competitions of St. Thomas and also reproduces the lyrics of popular Virgin Islands calypsos, and historical programs from past calypso tents on the islands. While not a scholarly history of the islands' musical life, The Memoirs of Alton Augustus Adams Sr.: First Black Bandmaster of the United States Navy were recently published by the University of California Press in a scholarly edition by Mark Clague. This book offers a first-hand account of musical life in the Virgin Islands from the 1900s through the 1950s. Adams's remembrances are surprisingly precise as in addition to his musical activities, he worked as a journalist and much of his writing is based upon the articles and notes he penned for The St. Thomas Times and The Bulletin as well as The Pittsburgh Courier.

== See also ==
- Dutch Virgin Islands
- British Virgin Islands
