= Afro–Virgin Islanders =

Virgin Islanders of African descent

Afro–Virgin Islanders, African Virgin Islanders, or Black Virgin Islanders, are people of the African diaspora who reside in the United States Virgin Islands, British Virgin Islands, and Spanish Virgin Islands, which, overall, constitutes the Virgin Islands.

== Origins ==
4,919 enslaved Africans were forcibly transported from the Bight of Benin. 16,203 enslaved Africans were forcibly transported from the Bight of Biafra. 18,618 enslaved Africans were forcibly transported from the Gold Coast. 1,149 enslaved Africans were forcibly transported from Senegambia. 1,635 enslaved Africans were forcibly transported from Sierra Leone. 2,818 enslaved Africans were forcibly transported from the Windward Coast. 12,774 enslaved Africans were forcibly transported from western Central Africa. 28,638 enslaved Africans were forcibly transported from an unspecified region(s) in Africa. Of the 86,910 enslaved Africans who were forcibly transported, 73,109, or 84%, arrived in the United States Virgin Islands and British Virgin Islands.

== History ==
The British Virgin Islands' census, which reflected the transition from subsistence agriculture and cotton to the more labor-intense production of sugar, corresponded with the growth of its population: 547 Afro–Virgin Islanders in 1717; 1,509 Afro–Virgin Islanders in 1720; 6,121 Afro–Virgin Islanders in 1756; 9,000 Afro–Virgin Islanders in 1774; and 9,220 Afro–Virgin Islanders in 1805.

== Culture ==
The Spanish Virgin Islands, British Virgin Islands, and United States Virgin Islands are connected with one another through their historic statuses of being United States’ colonies. Additionally, the islands are interconnected through their considerable numbers of diasporic African populations and their diasporic African cultural heritage (e.g., cuisines, cuisine preparation, cultural pride in African/Cocolo heritage, farm-based economy, popular music, religious music).

=== Language ===
Virgin Islands Creole is limited in its written attestation prior to 1900. However, the earlier developed Virgin Islands language, Negerhollands, provides supportive evidence for its diagnostic traits existing much earlier than 1900. The diagnostic traits, which derive from African languages, are found in both Virgin Islands Creole and Negerhollands. Saint Kitts Creole and Virgin Islands Creole also share many of the same words found in African languages. Regarding the diagnostic traits found in Virgin Islands Creole, in descending order, the following ethnic groups were found among enslaved Africans in the Virgin Islands: "Amina, Karabari, Ibo, Sokko, Watje, Kassenti, Congo, Kanga, Papa, Loango, Angola and Fula." Additionally, in ascending order, the following languages were spoken among enslaved Africans in the Virgin Islands: "Akan, Gbe, Igbo, and several West Bantu languages." Further, the Akan language contributed significantly to the development of Virgin Islands Creole. Furthermore, languages from the Gold Coast also contributed significantly to the development of Virgin Islands Creole.

=== Music ===
Since the enslavement period of Afro–Virgin Islanders in the United States Virgin Islands, the musical and dance culture of Cariso in St. Croix and Bamboula in St. Thomas has existed. Compared to Bamboula and Cariso, Quelbe is a younger cultural tradition. Though Bamboula and Cariso have undergone a decrease in popularity in the Virgin Islands, the popularity of Quelbe has increased.

== Demography ==
Out of 110,000 people, Afro–Virgin Islanders, who are the most numerous group, constitute approximately 48% of the population in the United States Virgin Islands. Afro-Caribbean people also constitute approximately 27% of its population.

In the Spanish Virgin Islands, Black Virgin Islanders constitute 56% of Culebra’s 1,818 residents and, possibly due to undercounting, 28% of Vieques’ 9,301 residents.

== Genetics ==
=== Saint Thomas ===
==== Autosomal DNA ====
In addition to being found to have 2.6% (±2.1%) Native American and 10.6% (±2.3%) European ancestry, Afro–Virgin Islanders from St. Thomas, who were sampled in 2008, were found to be 86.8% (±2.2%) West African. In addition to being found to have 5.6% (±4.9%) Native American and 16.9% (±21.1%) European ancestry, Afro–Virgin Islanders from Saint Thomas, who were sampled in 2013, were found to be 77.4% (±21.9%) West African.

==== Medical DNA ====
Risk allele variants G1 and G2 are associated with chronic kidney disease, which are common among populations of Sub-Saharan African ancestry; the G2 variant occurs at a 3%-8% rate among populations of western Central African ancestry and origin.

Some infectious diseases are protected against due to African ancestry. Hereditary blood disorders, such as sickle cell anemia and thalassemia, produce an effect on the development of hemoglobin, which, consequently, prevents the reproduction of malaria parasites within the erythrocyte. Populations with West African ancestry, which come as a result of the Trans-Atlantic slave trade, tend to have occurrences of sickle cell anemia and thalassemia.
