= Virgin Islands Creole =

English-based creole spoken in the Virgin Islands and the SSS islands

- Netherlands Antilles Creole English
- Native to: British Virgin Islands, US Virgin Islands, Spanish Virgin Islands, Saba, Saint Martin, Sint Eustatius, and the Virgin Islands and SSS islands diaspora
- Native speakers: (76,000 cited 1980–2011)
- Language family: English Creole: Atlantic; Eastern; Southern; Virgin Islands Creole

Language codes
- ISO 639-3: vic
- Glottolog: virg1240
- Linguasphere: to -ape and 52-AAB-apg to api (SSS varieties) 52-AAB-apa to -ape and 52-AAB-apg to api (SSS varieties)

Virgin Islands Creole, or Virgin Islands Creole English, is an English-based creole consisting of several varieties spoken in the Virgin Islands and the nearby SSS islands of Saba, Saint Martin and Sint Eustatius, where it is known as Saban English, Saint Martin English, and Statian English, respectively.

The term "Virgin Islands Creole" is formal terminology used by scholars and academics, and rarely used in everyday speech. Informally, the creole is known as a dialect, as many locals perceive the creole as a dialect of English, not an English creole language. But academic sociohistorical and linguistic research suggests that it is in fact an English creole language.

Because there are several varieties of Virgin Islands Creole, it is also colloquially known by the specific island on which it is spoken: Crucian dialect, Thomian dialect, Tortolian dialect or Tolan dialect, Saban dialect, Saint Martin dialect, Statian dialect.

== History ==
The creole was formed when enslaved Africans, unable to communicate with each other and their European owners due to being taken from different regions of West Africa with different languages, created an English-based pidgin with West African–derived words and grammatical structure. This was creolized as it was passed on to subsequent generations as their native tongue.

The Danish colonies St. Thomas and St. John had a European population of mainly Dutch origin, which led to enslaved Africans first creating a Dutch-based creole, known as Negerhollands. Negerhollands was in mainstream usage on St. Thomas and St. John until the 19th century, when the British occupied the Danish West Indies from 1801 to 1802 and 1807 to 1815. As English became preferred as a trade and business language in the busy port of Charlotte Amalie, Virgin Islands Creole became established in preference to Negerhollands. Some of the population continued to use Negerhollands well into the 20th century.

Unlike the continental European population of the other Danish West Indian islands, that of St. Croix was mostly of English, Irish and Scottish origin, which led to African slaves developing an English-based creole throughout the 18th and 19th centuries. By the 19th century, Virgin Islands Creole was spoken on St. Thomas and St. John, as Negerhollands faded away. By the end of the 19th century, English creole completely replaced Negerhollands as the native dialect of St. Thomas and St. John.

The creole had also been developing in the present-day British Virgin Islands. The British took over the islands from the Dutch in 1672. Enslaved Africans were brought to work on plantations on the islands of Tortola, Virgin Gorda, Anegada, and Jost Van Dyke where they, like those enslaved on St. Croix, developed an English-based creole. Although the US and British Virgin Islands are politically separate, they share a common Virgin Islands culture, similar history based on colonialism and slavery, and some common bloodlines.

Like those in the Virgin Islands, African slaves were brought to the SSS islands of Saba, Sint Eustatius and Saint Martin. The prevalence of Europeans from the British Isles on these islands, as well as the SSS islands' proximity and trade with nearby English-speaking islands, resulted in an English creole being spoken in the SSS islands. Due to the heavy importation of workers from Saint Martin after the 1848 emancipation in the Danish West Indies, as well as a tendency for wealthy planters to own plantations in both the Virgin Islands and SSS islands, the "ancestral" inhabitants (descendants of the original African slaves and European colonists) of the SSS islands share common bloodlines and a common culture with those of the US and British Virgin Islands.

== Varieties ==
Today the creole is native to the US and British Virgin Islands and the nearby SSS islands of Saba, Saint Martin (both French and Dutch sides) and Sint Eustatius. Though not called by the same name, the Virgin Islands and SSS varieties are considered by linguists to be the same creole.

There are slight variations from island to island. The speech of St. Croix (known as Crucian) is the most distinct, sharing many similarities with the English creoles of Belize and Panama. This is perhaps due to migration from St. Croix to Panama during the building of the Panama Canal. The speech of the SSS islands is slightly closer to that of the British Virgin Islands than that of the US Virgin Islands. The speech of St. Thomas and St. John shares distinct similarities with both the Crucian and British Virgin Islands variants.

== Language use and perceptions ==
Virgin Islands Creole does not have the status of an official language. The language of government, education, and the media is American English in the US Virgin Islands, British English in the British Virgin Islands, both Dutch and English on Saba, Sint Eustatius and the Dutch side of Saint Martin, and French on the French side of Saint Martin.

Like most Anglophone Caribbean islands, a post-creole speech continuum exists, in which there are two extremes—standard English (known as the acrolect) and the creole in its most distinct, or raw, form (known as the basilect).

Due to the constant contact between standard English and Virgin Islands Creole in local society, there are many in-between speech varieties as well (known as mesolects). Most native Virgin Islanders can easily manoeuvre this continuum depending on their mood, subject matter, or addressee.

In recent decades, the basilect form of the creole has typically only been spoken by older islanders. Although no longer in common use among the younger population, it has been preserved in historical plays, folk songs and local literature. The variety spoken by middle-aged and younger Virgin Islanders today is of a mesolectal form that still retains numerous creole features but is slightly closer to standard English than the basilect older islanders speak.

Virgin Islands Creole has different forms that vary by the speaker's age, as many words and expressions are known only by older islanders, while some relatively newer words and expressions are known only to younger islanders. The creole continues to undergo changes in a post-creole environment. Its most modern mesolectal form mainly derives from traditional Virgin Islands Creole terms, idioms, proverbs and sentence structure, with influences from African-American and Jamaican idioms, due to the prevalence of African-American and Jamaican mainstream pop culture in the Leeward Islands region. The variant of Virgin Islands Creole spoken on St. Croix, known as Crucian, contains many Spanish-derived words due to St. Croix's large ethnic Puerto Rican population. Many Crucians of Puerto Rican descent speak a Spanglish-like code switching of Puerto Rican Spanish and the local Crucian dialect. In addition, due to long-standing historical and family ties between St. Croix and the nearby Puerto Rican islands of Vieques and Culebra, many Vieques and Culebra locals of Crucian descent also speak Crucian dialect. As the English creole is spoken in Dutch St. Martin, and Spanish is the second most dominant language there after English and creole, Puerto Ricans and other Hispanics also speak Spanglish-like code switching of Puerto Rican and other Spanish dialects and local dialect of the island, along with Dutch and standard English. The same situation obtains in Saba and St. Eustatius; in the British Virgin Islands, a Spanglish-like code switching of Spanish and creole with British English is spoken.

As in other Caribbean creoles, proverbs are prevalent in Virgin Islands Creole. But in 2004, a linguistic study group in cooperation with the University of Puerto Rico’s Rio Piedras campus found that many old proverbs in the Crucian dialect, common among older generations, have faded away and are not widely known by young Crucians. Many Virgin Islanders who migrate to the United States often return with American-influenced speech patterns (colloquially known as yankin') that influence their peer groups' speech. These changes, as well as the perception of many older Virgin Islanders that the dialect is undergoing decreolization, have inspired debates about whether the dialect young Virgin Islanders speak today is in fact Virgin Islands Creole.

Like most Caribbean creoles, the use of Virgin Islands Creole can vary depending on socioeconomic class. The middle and upper classes tend to speak it informally among friends and at home, but code switch to Standard English in the professional sphere. The lower socioeconomic classes tend to use the dialect in almost every aspect of daily life.

In the US Virgin Islands, there has been an underlying pressure on Virgin Islanders to discard their dialect due to Americanization since the 1960s. The US acquired the islands from Denmark in 1917, but American influence did not arrive until the early 1960s. Standard American English is associated with social mobility, as it is widely used in business and professional circles. Virgin Islands Creole, while appreciated for its cultural value and widely used informally, is often seen as an impediment to economic and educational progress.

The majority of Virgin Islanders speak Virgin Islands Creole, but due to immigration from the rest of the Caribbean and the US, some Virgin Islands residents do not speak it. Most non-native longtime residents can understand spoken Virgin Islands Creole, whether or not they speak it. In local vernacular, Virgin Islands Creole is rarely called a creole, as locally, "creole" (as well as "patois") usually refers to the French-based creoles spoken by St. Lucian, Dominican and Haitian immigrants. Instead, Virgin Islanders tend to refer to the dialect by their native island (i.e. "Crucian dialect", "Thomian dialect", "Tolian dialect", etc.)

Like other Caribbean creoles, Virgin Islands Creole is generally unwritten. But local authors often write in the creole in colloquial literature, and young Virgin Islanders tend to write in it when communicating online. Because no standard spelling system exists in Virgin Islands Creole, those who attempt to write it use English orthography.

The prevailing sentiment is that Virgin Islands Creole cannot be learned like a standard language, but only acquired through having spent one's formative years in the Virgin Islands. Attempts by Virgin Islands non-native residents to speak the dialect, even out of respect, are often met with disapproval. A notable exception applies to immigrants who cannot speak English upon arrival. For example, people from the Dominican Republic and Haiti, lacking fluency in English upon arrival, often learn Virgin Islands Creole before they master standard English. In nearby French St. Martin, some people from France and the French West Indies who lack fluency in English upon arrival in St. Martin learn the variety of St. Martin English the native population speaks.

== Grammatical structure and pronunciation ==
Like other Caribbean creoles, Virgin Islands Creole has a smaller set of pronouns than English, and conjugations occur less often. For example, the English phrase "I gave it to her" would translate to Ah gi'e it toh she in Virgin Islands Creole. Another common pattern in Virgin Islands Creole is the absence of the letter "s" in the plural, possessive and third person present tense. For example, "my eyes" would translate to ma eye dem.

=== Differences from English ===
Pronunciation differs from Standard English in various ways. Virgin Islands and SSS island accents are somewhat similar to those of other Caribbean countries, especially Guyana, the Cayman Islands, Belize and Panama, but are also unique in many ways.

As in most Anglophone Caribbean dialects, in Virgin Islands Creole, dental fricatives (the "th" sound) are often omitted from speech, and replaced by dental plosives ("t" or "d" sounds). The vowel pronunciation of Virgin Islands Creole can widely differ from American English. For example, in Virgin Islands Creole (as well as most other Anglophone Caribbean creoles), the suffix "er" in English, /ər/ in American English, is pronounced /æ/ (for example: computer is pronounced [kompuːtæ] ("computah"), and never is pronounced [nevæ] ("nevah")), though not all words ending in "er" are pronounced this way.

As on many other Caribbean islands, the "oi" sound in Standard English is replaced with long I (/aɪ/). For example, the English word "join" would be pronounced jine. Such anomalies have their roots in 17th- and 18th-century England, where such vowel sounds were pronounced similarly.

Virgin Islands Creole also displays similarities to the English-based pidgin and creole languages of West Africa, due to their common descent from the blending of African substrate languages with English as the superstrate language.

=== Variations in grammar and speech among islands ===
Local speech varies among the US and British Virgin Islands. It is commonplace for such differences to be pointed out in jest when Virgin Islanders of different islands congregate. For example, the pronunciation of the standard English phrase "come here" would be come ya on St. Croix and come heh on St. Thomas, St. John and the British Virgin Islands. On St. Martin, it is pronounced come hyuh. In addition, the Virgin Islands Creole form of the word "car" is cyar on St. Croix and cah on St. Thomas, St. John and the British Virgin Islands. These two anomalies are due to Irish influence on St. Croix during the Danish colonial period.

Vowel sounds can also widely differ between islands. For example, the word "special" is usually pronounced speshahl on St. Croix and speshuhl on St. Thomas, St. John, the British Virgin Islands, and St. Martin. "Island" is usually pronounced islahn' on St. Croix and isluhn' on St. Thomas, St. John, the British Virgin Islands, and St. Martin.

Another commonly cited example of linguistic differences between the islands is the usage of the term deh, the Virgin Islands Creole form of the standard English adverb "there". On St. Croix, another deh is often added, forming the phrase deh-deh. Such usage is also found on many Caribbean islands outside the Virgin Islands. There are many instances where words and phrases (especially slang) that exist on one island do not exist on another. In addition, the Virgin Islands Creole spoken on St. Croix is often described as being more raw, or distant from standard English, than those of the other Virgin Islands.

== Virgin Islands Creole proverbs ==
- Who don't hear does feel.
- What yoh do in de dark does come to light.
- Time longer dan twine.
- Every skin teeth ain' a grin.
- Monkey know wha' tree to clime.
- Do for do ain' no obeah
- When the wind blow foul, batty does show

== See also ==
- Krio language
- Nigerian Pidgin English
