= WSTX =

WSTX may refer to:

- WSTX (AM), a radio station broadcasting at 970 kHz on the AM band, licensed to Christiansted, U. S. Virgin Islands.
- WSTX-FM, a radio station broadcasting at 100.3 MHz on the FM band, licensed to Christiansted, U. S. Virgin Islands.
- White Settlement, Texas, a suburb of Fort Worth, Texas
