= Andrew Bain =

Andrew Bain may refer to:

- Andrew Bain (horn player), horn player with the Los Angeles Philharmonic
- Andrew Bain (singer), British singing dentist
- Andrew Geddes Bain (1797–1864), South African geologist, road engineer, palaeontologist and explorer
- Andrew Moon Bain, American artist and record producer
