= G. Luz A. James =

Gerard Luz A. James, better known as G. Luz A. James, (circa 1926 – September 16, 2006) was a U.S. Virgin Islander politician, lawyer, businessman and broadcaster. James was also the first Virgin Islander to become an adjutant general in the Virgin Islands National Guard.

James was one of four brothers who were described as very influential in the U.S. Virgin Islands. Wilfred James was a teacher; Ulmont James was credited with introducing merit pay to the U.S. Virgin Islands; and Randall "Doc" James was a doctor and four-term Senator in the territorial legislature. He is also the namesake of Randall "Doc" James Racetrack.

James began his career on WIVI Radio-970 in Saint Croix as a disc jockey. In the 1970s, James purchased the WSTX (AM) and WSTX-FM radio stations, which he owned and operated until he sold them in the early 2000s.

Luz was elected to the Virgin Islands Legislature as a Senator during the 12th legislature. He also served as the U.S. Virgin Islands' Director of Urban Renewal, which has since been renamed the Department of Property and Procurement. Luz spearheaded the redevelopment of the Water Gut area in the Virgin Islands. He also became teacher at the Christiansted High School in Christiansted.

He earned a law degree and became a lawyer when he was in his 40s. He unsuccessfully sought re-election to his old seat in the Legislature during his later years, but remained active in politics. He hosted and broadcast election night results from the Virgin Islands Elections Office during primary and general elections.

G. Luz A. James died in his sleep at his home on September 16, 2006, at the age of 80. He was survived by his wife, Asta Klyvert-James; four children – Gerard Luz James, a former Lieutenant Governor of the United States Virgin Islands; Barbara, lawyer; Emmeth, an accountant; and Kelsey, a doctor.

Then-Governor Charles Turnbull called James, "...someone who devoted his life's work to the service and betterment of the V.I. people in many roles and responsibilities…. he fought hard for the things he believed in and for the people of St. Croix and the territory." Former Lt. Governor Vargrave Richards also paid tribute to James saying, "He was a great public servant, very active and truly civic minded. He always had the interest of this community at heart."
