= Blinky =

Blinky may refer to:

== Characters ==
- Blinky (comics), a character in the UK comic The Dandy
- Blinky (Pac-Man), a red (sometimes orange) ghost in the Pac-Man franchise
- Blinky (mascot), the mascot of FreeDOS
- Blinky (The Simpsons), three-eyed fish from the animated television sitcom The Simpsons
- Blinky Bill, anthropomorphic koala appearing in Australian books and a television program
- Blinky the Clown, a clown from the television program called Blinky's Fun Club
- Blinky, the villain from Stamp Day for Superman
- Blinky the Dog, a character in the weekly comic strip This Modern World
- Blinky, male koala in Noozles, an anime also known as The Wonderous Koala Blinky
- Blinky, the robotic title character from the film BlinkyTM
- Blinky, the playable character in Titanic Blinky

== People ==
- Blinky (singer) (born 1944), artist on Motown, real name Sondra Williams
- Blinky Elizalde, judoka competitor and coach
- Blinky Palermo (1943–1977), 20th-century German abstract painter
- Sylvester McIntosh (1934–2017), also known as Blinky, Crucian singer and bandleader

== Others ==
- Blinky (film), a 1923 comedy-western film starring Hoot Gibson
- Blinky (novelty), a small flashing novelty item
- A police car used by the Toronto Police Service, to promote child safety
- Blinky, the Hello, World! for embedded systems

== See also ==
- Blinky Blink, American rapper
- Blinkie, a character in The Scarecrow of Oz by L. Frank Baum
