= Liberian English =

Varieties of English spoken in Liberia

Liberian English refers to the varieties of English spoken in Liberia. Four such varieties exist:

- Standard Liberian English, the Liberian variety of International English. It is the language taught in secondary and tertiary institutions. It is used in oratory and by newsreaders.
- Liberian Settler English, the language of the descendants of the 16,000 African Americans who immigrated to Liberia in the nineteenth century
- Kru Pidgin English, the language of Kru migrant workers and mariners. It is now moribund.
- Liberian Kreyol, the creolized variety spoken by most Liberian speakers of English. It is the Liberian descendant of the West African Pidgin English that developed all along the West African coast in the eighteenth century. It has been significantly influenced by Liberian Settler English.

Prior to the twenty-first century, Liberians referred to all these varieties simply as "English." In the present century, however, the term "Kolokwa" (from the English word "colloquial") has become widely used.

== The sound system of English in Liberia ==
The vowel system is distinct from that found in other West African variants; Standard Liberian English distinguishes [i] from [ɪ], and [u] from [ʊ], and uses the diphthongs [aɪ], [aʊ], and [əɪ]. Vowels can be nasalized. The final vowel of happy is [ɛ]. It favors open syllables, usually omitting syllable-final [t], [d], or a fricative. The interdental fricatives [θ, ð] appear as [t, d] in syllable-initial position (such as thing and this having respective pronunciations of ting and dis), and as [f, v] finally. The glottal fricative [h] is preserved, as is the voiceless labio-velar fricative [ʍ] (in such words as whit and which in contrast to voiced [w] in wit and wish). Except in word-initial position, affricates have lost their stop component, thus [tʃ] > [ʃ]. The liquid [r] is not pronounced at the end of a word or before a consonant, making Standard Liberian English a non-rhotic dialect, in spite of not using the British/Commonwealth spelling.

Additionally, English in Liberia includes particles that occur at the end of a clause that amplify the purpose of the clause. The most commonly occurring particle is o, which is a feature generally of Kru and Kwa languages but shows up in other neighboring Niger-Congo languages as well as in West African varieties of English more generally, including pidgins and creoles. In Liberian English (and in the other languages of the region), o emphasizes that a proposition is of current relevance to the speaker and hearer. Beyond its use to mark emphasis, o frequently occurs to correct a hearer's mistaken assumption or to indicate what will happen next.

== Kru Pidgin English ==
Kru Pidgin English is a moribund variety that was spoken by Krumen. These were individuals, most often from the Klao Bassa people and Grebo ethnic groups, who worked as sailors on ships along the West African coast and also as migrant workers and domestics in such British colonies as the Gold Coast (Ghana) and Nigeria. The Krumen tradition dates back to the end of the eighteenth century. With the end of the British colonial presence in West Africa in the mid-twentieth century, however, the tradition came to an end, and with it the ongoing use of Kru Pidgin English.

Kru Pidgin English is quite distinct from other forms of English in Liberia and has numerous unique traits. Plural marking, for instance, is done solely by the suffixal -z, while other variants will also integrate a postponed den as another plural marking form. Another feature of Kru Pidgin English, perhaps one of the most distinct, is the lack of tense-marking that even often extends to copulas in many cases. An example of the lack of tense marking is "he feel hot" instead of "he had felt hot." When it comes to other markers, Kru Pidgin English almost exclusively has de to mark aspect, such as in the statement "we de go na" in the place of "we had gone to."

== Kolokwa ==
Prior to the twenty-first century, Liberians used the term "English" for all Liberian varieties with an English lexicon. However, linguists used the term "Vernacular Liberian English" for the variety that was generally spoken. Now Kolokwa has become the general term for this variety. Kolokwa developed from the West African Pidgin English spoken all along the West African coast. It has been significantly influenced by Liberian Settler English, the variety that African American immigrants brought to Liberia in the nineteenth century and is spoken today by the immigrants' descendants. Kolokwa phonology owes much to the Niger-Congo languages, especially those spoken along the coast, primarily such Kru languages as Bassa and Klao but also the Mande language Vai. Kolokwa has been analysed as being a post-creole continuum. As such, the term "Kolokwa" covers a range of ways of speaking, from quite distinct from International English to much closer to it.

== Role of English in Liberia ==
From its emergence at the beginning of the 18th century, a primary motivator for using an English-lexifier variety was its use in maritime trade. Once the Settlers arrived and asserted political dominance, English/Kolokwa attained a central role in the governance of the country and provided Liberians who did not share a Niger-Congo language with a medium for interaction. The widespread displacement of Liberians during the civil war increased the probability that individual Liberians needed to interact with other Liberians with whom they had no other language in common. Thus, the civil war can be seen to have promoted the use of English/Kolokwa. Unlike many other West African countries, English was oddly introduced to Liberia.

English has historically been central to the overall development of the country. When the Settler governments prevailed, the Department of Education adopted a policy to provide education in English. This policy was not unpopular. People wanted their children to acquire English in order to have access to the economic benefits associated with it. One adverse effect of the English-only policy was that knowledge of local languages was not prized. Individuals were assessed strictly on their ability to speak English.

A 1999 study found that of Liberian immigrants across the United States, nearly 73% spoke English at home, and many children did not speak any other language. Two main reasons given for this trend are intertribal marriages, which inspire people across tribes to have a common medium of communication; and parents wanting their children to be proficient in English, especially those parents who are educated themselves. Currently some people are pushing for native languages to be taught in schools as a way to preserve the culture, but these tribes do continue to have their own impact on how English is spoken across the country.

== Bibliography ==
- Singler, John Victor (1997). "The configuration of Liberia's Englishes". World Englishes. 16 (2): 205–231. doi:10.1111/1467-971X.00060.
- Singler, John Victor (1986). "Copula Variation in Liberian Settler English and American Black English". In Smitherman, Geneva (ed.). Talkin and Testifyin: The Language of Black America. Wayne State University Press. pp. 129–164. ISBN 0-8143-1805-3.
- d'Azevedo, Warren; Gold, Michael (1979). Some Terms from Liberian Speech (Revised and enlarged ed.). Cornell University.
- Singler, John Victor (2000). "Optimality Theory, the Minimal-Word Constraint, and the Historical Sequencing of Substrate Influence in Pidgin/Creole Genesis". In McWhorter, John (ed.). Language Change and Language Contact in Pidgins and Creoles. John Benjamins Publishing Company. pp. 335–354. ISBN 90-272-5243-2.
- Hancock, Ian F. (1974). "English in Liberia". American Speech. 49 (3): 224–229. doi:10.2307/3087801. JSTOR 3087801.
- Ballah, Henryatta L. (2019). "Liberia: A Colonized Nation and the Role of English in that Process". Journal of West African History. 5 (1): 29–52. doi:10.14321/jwestafrihist.5.1.0029. ISSN 2327-1868. JSTOR 10.14321/jwestafrihist.5.1.0029.
- Ngovo, Bernard L. (1998). "English in Liberia". English Today. 14 (2): 46–50. doi:10.1017/S0266078400010191.
