= Liberian Kreyol =

English-based Kolokwa language

Kolokwa English
- Region: Liberia
- Ethnicity: Americo-Liberians
- Speakers: L1: 113,000 (2015); L2: 5 million (2021)
- Language family: English Creole: Atlantic; West African Pidgin English; Merico; Kolokwa English

Language codes
- ISO 639-3: lir
- Glottolog: libe1240

Liberian Kreyol (also known as Kolokwa or Liberian Kolokwa English) is an Atlantic English-based creole language spoken in Liberia. It was spoken by 1,500,000 people as a second language at the 1984 census, which accounted for about 70% of the population at the time. It is historically and linguistically related to Merico, a creole spoken in Liberia, but it is grammatically distinct from it. There are regional dialects such as the Kru and Kpelleh kolokwa English used by the Kru fishermen.

Liberian Kolokwa Language developed from Liberian Interior Pidgin English, the Liberian version of West African vernacular English, though it has been significantly influenced by Liberian Settler English, itself based on American English, particularly African-American Vernacular English and Southern American English. Its phonology owes much to the indigenous Languages of Liberia. It has been analyzed having a post-creole continuum. As such, rather than being a pidgin wholly distinct from English, it is a range of varieties that extend from the highly pidginized to one that shows many similarities to English as spoken elsewhere in West Africa.

Kolokwa originated in Liberia among the Settlers, the free English-speaking African Americans from the Southern United States who emigrated to Liberia between 1819 and 1860. It has since borrowed some words from French and from other West African languages.

Kreyol is spoken mostly as an intertribal lingua franca in the interior of Liberia.

== Grammatical features ==
Kreyol uses no for negation, bi (be) as the copula, fɔ for "to" in verbal infinitives.

== See also ==
- Liberian English
- Krio language, an English-based creole spoken in Sierra Leone
- Nigerian Pidgin
