= Bilikisu Labaran =

Nigerian Journalist

Bilkisu Labaran
- Born: Bilkisu Labaran; Kano
- Citizenship: Nigerian
- Occupation: Journalist/Academic
- Employer: Reuters
- Known for: Journalism

Bilkisu Labaran is a Nigerian journalist, editor and former head of Africa News & Current affairs at BBC World Service. She helped establish BBC pidgin and was the first Nigerian BBC editor.

Labaran is currently a journalist and editor at the Reuters News Agency.

== Career ==
Labaran was a lecturer at Ahmadu Bello University Zaria, Nigeria. She was the Nigeria Country Director for the BBC World Service Trust.. In 2020 she was ranked number five of 25 Most Powerful Women in Nigerian journalism, compiled by Women in Journalism Africa.
