= Andrew Moon Bain =

American musician

Andrew Moon Bain is a visual artist, record producer, musician, songwriter, and designer. He grew up in Seattle, Washington, where he was very active in the arts as a youth. He was a young cellist in the Seattle Youth Symphony Orchestras from ages 8–12. He also formed a hip-hop group in high school and later an original rock band with his younger brother. He relocated to Providence, Rhode Island as a young adult and earned a Bachelor of Fine Arts in sculpture from the Rhode Island School of Design. Bain remained in New England after earning his degree, subsequently becoming an active and integral member of Providence's exploding art community. His visual art is represented in numerous private collections, museums and at the Rhode Island School of Design Museum. In the summer of 2019, Bain did a large-scale wall installation at the Brown University Perry and Marty Granoff Center for the Creative Arts entitled “We Are All Carbon Beings”.

== Lustre Kings ==
Between high school and college, Bain traveled the United States extensively. His travels took him to Jamaica, West Indies, a trip that indelibly influenced his life. Shortly after this first visit, his childhood friend, Corrin Haskell, taught school in Jamaica and came back with a 7” inch vinyl record he produced. Bain immediately jumped on board to co-found independent US based reggae label, Lustre Kings Productions in 1997.

Bain spent 13 years living in Brooklyn, New York, where he continued to be a producer and visual artist. He has traveled and worked extensively in the United States, Europe, Jamaica and throughout the Caribbean, which have all influenced his life, art and music.

== Music production and Zion I Kings ==
Bain is a sound record engineer, mixing engineer, and songwriter. He is one third of the prolific modern roots reggae production team Zion I Kings as well as the writing and production duo PaperStars, both parties receiving a Grammy Award nomination in 2013 for Snoop Lion Reincarnated (album). Bain has written and produced records for artists such as Wyclef Jean, Sizzla, Snoop Dogg, Diplo, Protoje, Major Lazer, Midnite, Anthony B, Blakkamoore, Lutan Fyah and many others.

Recently Bain completed production on Blakkamoore’s third full-length studio album, Upward Spiral. As well as French/New Caledonian artist Marcus Gad's next album Rhythm of Serenity (Lustre Kings/Baco Records ).

In 2010, Bain co-founded Providence, Rhode Island–based Rock & Soul band, Boo City. Boo City's sound has many stylistic influences including Soul, Rhythm & Blues, Rock, Hip-Hop, and Reggae. In addition to Boo City, he is currently working on a solo project under the moniker, Brown Bones, an acoustic, urban-folk inspired album with subtle electronic elements.

== Discography ==
2020

- Upward Spiral – Blakkamoore
- Rhythm of Serenity – Marcus Gad
- Mash Down Riddim- Zion I Kings
- Culture Dem 4 – Lustre Kings Productions

2019

- Not Another Word – Protoje, Lila Ike, Agent Sasco
- Rebel With a Cause – Pressure Busspipe
- Rebirth- Marlon Asher
- Get Aktive – Junior Natural
- Mek A Menshun – Akae Beka
- Life of a Gheto Youth Vol. 2 – Various Artists

2018

- Digital Ancient Dub – I Kings
- Nurtured Frequency – Akae Beka
- Perfect Storm Riddim – Zion I Kings

2017

- Arkaingelle – Tru Da Fyah
- 100 Years Strong – Pressure, Stanley & The 10 Sleepless Knights
- Dub in Zion – Zion I Kings
- Mash Down Georgetown – Jahdan Blakkamoore

2016

- 9 – Jah9 -
- Music Never Dies – Lutan Fyah
- Lifetime Riddim – Zion I Kings
- Market Place Riddim – Zion I Kings
- Portals – Akae Beka
- Livicated – Akae Beka
- Dub in Style – Zion I Kings

2015

- Order of Distinction – Jahdan Blakkamoore
- Lion of Judah Riddim – Various Artists
- Nyacoustic Chants – Various Artists
- Lion of Judah Riddim – Various Artists /Zion I Kings

2014

- Junction Riddim – Various Artists /Zion I Kings
- Therapeutic- Ziggi Recado
- Jah Warriah Riddim- Various Artists /Zion I Kings
- Redemption – Jah Bless
- The Sound – Pressure
- Ride Tru – Midnite – I Grade
- Beauty For Ashes – Midnite – I Grade

2013

- Free the Universe – Major Lazer
- Seven Bridges – Break Science
- Original Yard Food – General Jah Mikey
- New Scroll – Cornell Campbell
- Reincarnated – Snoop Lion
- Rootical – Lloyd Brown
- Queen of The Forest – Jahdan Blakkamoore feat. Illuminati Congo
- Songbird Riddim – Various Artists / Zion I Kings

2012

- Jah Golden Throne- Various Artists
- Meditation – Nazarenes
- Masterpiece – Glen Washington

2011

- Back for the First Time – Perfect Giddimani
- To Your Majesty – Danny I
- Unto the Pure – Illuminati Congo feat. Digital Ancient

2010

- Babylon Nightmare – Jahdan Blakkamoore
- Black Gold – Toussaint

2009

- Guns Don't Kill People, Lazers Do – Major Lazer
- Proverbs Riddim – Various Artists
- Lustre Kings in Dub Vol. 1 – Various Artists / Digital Ancient
- Know the Road – Norris Man
- Culture Dem vol. 3 – Various Artists

2008

- Infinite Dub – Midnite-Lustre Kings
- The Shining Riddim
- Joy Bells Ringing – Al Pancho
- Take Charge – Noble Society

2007

- Red Razor Riddim – Various Artists
- Unchangeable – Danny I
- Royal Muzik vol. 1 (Japanese Import)
- Live from the Frontline – Various Artists
- Rastafari Unity EP – Various Artists
- Infinite Quality – Midnite-Lustre Kings

2006

- New Day Riddim – Various Artists
- Salvation – The Lambsbread

2005

- Time and Place – Lutan Fyah
- Talking Drum Riddim – Various Artists
- Culture Dem vol. 2 – Various Artists
- Holding Firm – Ras Attitude

2004

- No Polotics Riddim – Various Artist
- Calling All Jah Children – Various Artist

2003

- Fortune Teller Riddim – Various Artists
- The Future – Turbulence
- Alarm Clock Riddim – Various Artists

2002

- African Charm Riddim – Various Artists
- Credential Riddim – Various Artists
- Culture Dem – Various Artists

2001

- Future Flow Riddim – Various Artists

2000

- Black Mystic Riddim – Various Artists
- Culture Dem – Various Artists

1999

- Ites Riddim – Various Artists
- Fire Works Riddim – Various Artists
