= Midnight Raver =

Music website

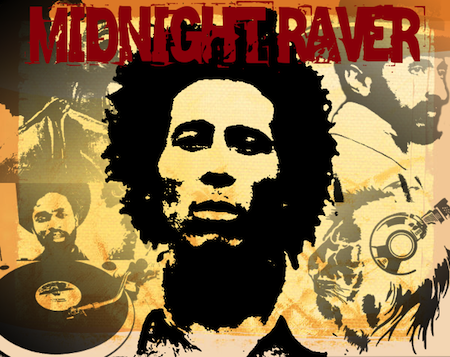
- Midnight Raver Official Logo
- Available in: English
- Owner: 10,000 Chariots LLC
- Creators: Michael Watson, Roger Steffens
- Editors: Michael Watson, Doug Wendt, Joseph Jurgensen, Glen Lockley, Peter Van Arnhem, Fred reGGaeLover
- Website: legendaryreggae.com
- Launched: 19 October 2011
- Current status: active

Midnight Raver was a website dedicated solely to the promotion and preservation of roots reggae, culture and dub. Contributors include authors and journalists, historians, record producers, broadcasters, lecturers, archivists, collectors and publishers.

Midnight Raver was an online resource for reggae news, historical perspective, and commentary and has been featured and sourced in The Guardian, BuzzFeed, Jamaica Observer, Billboard Magazine, Investors Business Daily, JamaicansMusic, PeterTosh.com, BobMarley.com, Pitchfork and other websites and publications of note. The website is also sourced in author Paul Sullivan's book ReMixology: Tracing the Dub Diaspora (2013).

Along with feature articles, live performance audio and video, and vintage press archives, Midnight Raver also featured interviews with reggae artists like Ziggy Marley, Bunny Wailer, Sly Dunbar, Robbie Shakespeare, Luciano, Adrian Sherwood, Bob Andy, Aston Barrett, Don Carlos, Flabba Holt, David Hinds of Steel Pulse plus many more.

In addition, Midnight Raver hosted exclusive streaming content from a variety of contributors including radio broadcasters Doug "Midnight Dread" Wendt and Dermot Hussey. Midnight Raver hosted the Midnight Dread Special, a weekly podcast featuring the original broadcasts of the Midnight Dread Radio Show which aired from 1979 to 1985 on KTIM and KQAK FM in San Rafael, California. Midnight Dread, 2015 recipient of the Rex Foundation's Ralph J. Gleason Award, hosted the very first reggae radio show in the US in 1974 with THE REGGAE EXPLOSION on KTIM San Rafael. Midnight Raver also hosted The Riff, the weekly podcast of Musgrave Award-winning Jamaican broadcaster/producer and Sirius/XM radio host Dermot Hussey. The Riff, produced by Dermot Hussey, features the latest in reggae, world, and jazz with interviews and commentary from artists and industry. The Riff also airs weekly on NewsTalk 93 FM in Jamaica.

On July 15, 2014, Midnight Raver launched a CrowdRise fundraising campaign to raise money for the restoration and replacement of African hand drums and other Jamaican cultural and historic artifacts that were lost in a house fire in Jamaica on July 2, 2014. The drums and other percussion instruments belonged to the Mystic Revelation of Rastafari, the group of drummers founded by Count Ossie and which played on "Oh Carolina", the ska number recorded by the Folkes Brothers in 1958.

On August 14, 2014, Shanachie Records announced through Midnight Raver their plans to release a Willi Williams/Yabby You project titled "Unification: From Channel One To King Tubbys With Willi Williams And Yabby You,' which includes tracks recorded in the late seventies and never released. According to label chief Randall Grass, the album was recorded between 1978 and 1980 at both fabled Channel One studio and King Tubby’s studio, utilizing a diverse group of top-shelf Jamaican musicians, including Sly & Robbie and the Revolutionaries, Soul Syndicate, The Gladiators, Jackie Mittoo, Bobby Ellis, Cedric “IM” Brooks and Bobby Kalphat.

The website was also involved in one of the best-reviewed reggae releases of 2015 - the Shanachie Yabby You retrospective box set titled Dread Prophecy: The Strange and Wonderful Story of Yabby You. Several of the site's contributors provided rare vinyl singles for digital transfer and inclusion on the album. The site was also heavily involved in the promotion of the set.

In 2015, Midnight Raver and Tuff Gong Worldwide collaborated on the #Marley70 Blog Series to commemorate the 70th birthday of reggae musician Bob Marley. #Marley70 Blog Series, which was hosted at www.bobmarley.com, consisted of monthly feature articles which examine pivotal points in Bob Marley's career. There were feature articles about The Wailers' 1973 Burnin' tour through California; Bob Marley's 1975 Kingston concert featuring the Jackson 5; Bob Marley and the Wailers' 1979 trip to Japan, Australia, and New Zealand; the Wailers' first television appearance, on the BBC's Old Grey Whistle Test in 1973, and more. Each feature included vintage press articles, concert reviews, published interviews, rare live audio, video, and photos along with exclusive interviews with Bob Marley's art director and former director of the Bob Marley Foundation in Jamaica, Neville Garrick.

In an interview with Barrington Levy which was posted to the website on February 26, 2015, Levy announced that his forthcoming album would be released through Doctor Dread's new record label Doctor Dread Records. The Grammy-nominated album AcousticaLevy was the first album to be released on the label and Doctor Dread's first album release since parting with RAS Records almost a decade ago.

== Midnight Raver and the U.S. reggae movement ==
Midnight Raver has reported extensively on the growing U.S. reggae movement, publishing feature articles and interviews with U.S. reggae artists like Harrison Stafford (Groundation), Easy Star, Christos DC, SOJA, and many more. Midnight Raver has provided a significant platform for the Virgin Islands contingent of U.S. reggae artists, featuring album reviews, feature stories, and podcasts on Midnite, Zion I Kings, Niyorah, Pressure, Dezarie and more. In a review of Midnite's 2014 album Beauty for Ashes, Midnight Raver stated that reggae fans are now living in the "I-Grade era," citing the label's dominance and influence on reggae over the past two decades:

In its list of the Top 50 Reggae Albums of the 2K, Midnight Raver placed Midnite's Beauty for Ashes at No. 3 and Jubilees of Zion at No. 1.
