= Merico language =

English-based creole of Liberia

Merico
- Americo-Liberian, American, Brokes English, Kwasai English, Waterside English, Water Street English
- Region: Liberia
- Ethnicity: Americo-Liberians
- Language family: English Creole: Atlantic; West African Pidgin English; Merico

Language codes
- ISO 639-3: –

Merico or Americo-Liberian (or the informal colloquial name "American") is an English-based creole language spoken until recently in Liberia by Americo-Liberians, descendants of original settlers, freed slaves, and African Americans who emigrated from the United States between 1821 and the 1870s. It is distinguished from Liberian Kreyol and from Kru, and may be connected to Gullah and Jamaican Creole.

The original settlers numbered 19,000 in 1860. By 1975 the language was partly decreolized, restricted to informal settings.

== Grammatical features ==
Plurals are unmarked, as in rak "rock", "rocks", or marked with a -dɛ̃ suffix, as in rak-dɛ̃ "rocks". The verb expressing "to be" is sʌ, as in shi sʌ smo "she is small", but adjectives may be used without it, as in hi big "he is big". Verbs are not inflected for past tense.

Separate particles are used to indicate some verb tenses:

- ɛ̃ for negation (ai ɛ̃ æs di chææ "I didn't ask the child"),
- dɘ or lɛ for continuing action (hi dɘ spiish "he is talking at great length", shi lɛ kræ "she is crying"),
- wu for future (wi wu kʌ̃ "we will come"),
- dɔ̃ or nɔ̃ for completed action (de dɔ̃ go dædɘdwe "they have gone that way", lilpis nɔ̃ lɛf "not a little piece was left")

The pronouns include:

- Subject: ai/a, yu/yɔ/yo, hi/i, shi, wi, de/dɛ̃
- Object: mi, yu, hi/hĩ, hɔ, wi/ɔs, dɛ̃'
- Possessive: mʌ/mi, yu/yo, hi/i, shi/hɔ, ou, dɛ

== See also ==
- Krio language
