= I Grade Records =

Record label

I Grade Records is a premier conscious music label from the US Virgin Islands. The label's mission is to produce the highest quality roots reggae music emanating from St. Croix and the US Virgin Islands.

== History ==
The label was founded in 2001 by Laurent "Tippy" Alfred. Since 2001 the label has a rapidly expanding catalogue of nineteen releases. I Grade Records is an active part of the growing roots reggae movement in the Virgin Islands. Over the past years, the world has begun to take notice of the high quality reggae music emanating from the VI, notably St. Croix. The Virgin Islands has a large number of talented artists and producers who are upholding the tradition of conscious, hard-core, heavy-weight reggae that harkens back to 70¹s era Jamaican roots, but with a modern feel and appeal. Led by the legendary roots band, Midnite, the artists from the VI are setting a new standard for conscious reggae music. I Grade Records is perhaps best known for its seven powerful collaborative albums with the world-renowned roots band, Midnite.

In 2014, I Grade Records collaborated with St. Thomas artist, Pressure (Buss Pipe) a.k.a. Delyno Brown to release the hit album, "The Sound" and unofficial anthem of the United States Virgin Islands (USVI), "Virgin Islands Nice", featured in the United States Territory's tourism marketing campaign across the globe filmed directed and edited by Digtak Films.

In addition to releasing seven crucial albums with Pressure, Midnite, I Grade has become known for its keen ear for new talent. I Grade Records was privileged to produce the debut album by Dezarie, the amazingly powerful female vocalist. The label has also produced and released the debut albums of Yahadani, Ancient King and Abja.

== Releases ==
- Nemozian Rasta-Midnite (2001)
- Fya-Dezarie (2001)
- Assini-Midnite (2002)
- Weep Not-Various Artist (2002)
- Geoman-Midnite (2003)
- Vijan-Midnite (2003)
- Inna Red I Hour-Abja (2004)
- One Atonement-Yahadanai (2004)
- Let Live-Midnite (2005)
- Conquering Sound-Ancient King (2005)
- A Different Age-NiyoRah (2005)
- Rasta Awake-Army (2005)
- Jah Grid-Midnite (2006)
- Mahogany Road-Abja (2006)
- Purification Session-NiyoRah (2006)
- Rule The time-Midnite (2007)
- Stolen Scrolls-NiyoRah (2007)
- Unchangeable-Danny I (2008)
- Ten Strings-Tuff Lion (2008)
- The Sound-Pressure (reggae musician) (2014)

== Sources ==
- Jamaica Gleaner: Singer Duane Stephenson working on St. Croix project
