= Laurent Alfred =

United States Virgin Islands swimmer

Personal information
- Born: September 19, 1974 (age 51) Haiti

Sport
- Sport: Swimming

Laurent Alfred, better known as Tippy, (born September 19, 1974) is a swimmer who represented the United States Virgin Islands. He competed in three events at the 1992 Summer Olympics. He is also a musician, record producer and the founder of the record label I Grade Records.

== Biography ==
Alfred was born in Haiti in 1974, and grew up on Saint Croix in the United States Virgin Islands. He graduated from Harvard University and from Yale Law School. As a musician, he played in New York City.

He competed for the US Virgin Islands at the 1991 Pan American Games in Havana, Cuba. The following year, at the 1992 Summer Olympics in Barcelona, Spain, Alfred competed in three freestyle events. He finished in 48th place in the men's 50 metre freestyle, 60th place in the men's 100 metre freestyle, and in 51st place in the men's 200 metre freestyle.

In the United States Virgin Islands, Alfred founded I Grade Records in 2003, focusing on roots reggae music, with the label releasing more than 30 albums. As a musician, he played guitars and keyboards in the Zion I Kings Band. He has also been involved in working with local politicians to help legalise medical marijuana.
