= WSTX-FM =

Radio station in Christiansted, US Virgin Islands

- Christiansted, U.S. Virgin Islands; United States
- Frequency: 100.3 MHz
- Branding: FM 100

Programming
- Format: Reggae

Ownership
- Owner: Caledonia Communication Corporation
- Sister stations: WSTX

Technical information
- Licensing authority: FCC
- Facility ID: 20601
- Class: B
- ERP: 50,000 watts
- HAAT: 314 meters (1,030 ft)
- Transmitter coordinates: 17°45′20″N 64°47′55″W

Links
- Public license information: Public file; LMS
- Webcast: Listen live
- Website: wstxradio.com

WSTX-FM (100.3 FM) is a radio station licensed to serve Christiansted, U.S. Virgin Islands. The station is owned by Caledonia Communication Corporation, a corporation whose majority shareholder, Kevin A. Rames, is an attorney based on St. Croix, U.S. Virgin Islands. Caledonia Communication Corporation purchased the radio station from Family Broadcasting, Inc. on November 19, 2010. The station owns and utilizes the tradename "The Soul of the Caribbean."

The station has been assigned these call letters by the Federal Communications Commission since the station was initially licensed.

On April 20, 2005, WSTX-FM began programming of the U.S. Virgin Islands's first 24-hour reggae radio station. The format was launched and programmed by Program Director and Radio Personality Troy Brown and features several Virgin Islands Reggae artists like Pressure "Busspipe," Midnite and Dezarie.

On October 15, 2009, Brown left WSTX to launch Shanty Vibes Radio. Since October, WSTX-FM has started playing more dancehall, Soca and Calypso. On August 13, 2010, WSTX-FM aired several hours of "Caribbean Hits" with Radio Personality “Mean” Dean but then switched back to the reggae format.
