= Nigerian Pidgin =

English-based creole languages

- Naijá (languej); Naija
- Native to: Nigeria
- Native speakers: L1: 4.65 million L2: 116 million (2020)
- Language family: English-African Creole: Guinea Coast Creole English; West African Pidgin English; Coastal Nigerian Krio; Nigerian-Ghanaian Krio; Nigerian Pidgin
- Writing system: Latin

Language codes
- ISO 639-3: pcm
- Glottolog: nige1257

Nigerian Pidgin or NPE, also known simply as Pidgin, Broken or as Naijá in scholarship, is an English-based creole language spoken as a lingua franca or vehicular language across Nigeria coming into existence during the 17th and 18th centuries as a result of contact between colonizing Britons and African slavers involved in the Atlantic slave trade. Sometimes referred to as Pijin or Vernacular, it has over time become the speech form with the widest geographical coverage and largest amount of speakers in Nigeria besides English.

It is the largest of the various varieties/registers of West African/Guinea coast creoles and can be spoken as a dialect or a decreolised acrolect by different speakers, who may switch between these forms depending on the social setting. Variations of what this article refers to as "Nigerian Pidgin" are also spoken across West and Central Africa, in countries such as Benin, Ghana, and Cameroon.

== Status ==
Nigerian Pidgin is commonly used throughout the country and across ethnic groups, but it does not have official status as it was developed to faciliate the trans-atlantic slave trade with the British colonial power.

In the 2010s, a common orthography was developed for Pidgin which has been gaining significant popularity in giving the language a harmonized writing system. In 2011, Google launched a search interface in Pidgin. In 2017, the BBC started BBC News Pidgin to provide services in Pidgin.

== Varieties ==
Nigerian Pidgin varies by location which also determines the influencing substrate language affecting the superstrate English structure resulting in varied flavours. Dialects of Nigerian Pidgin include; The Sapele–Warri–Ughelli dialect spoken in the western Niger Delta area, which is also sometimes grouped together with the Benin City dialect that has influences from the Bini language due to their geographical closeness and common features; The Port Harcourt dialect that has a mix of influences and elements from the mixed ethnicities indigenous to Rivers State and the eastern Niger Delta; The Lagos or Western dialect which is highly influenced by Yoruba lexical borrowings/linguistic elements and calque translations; and the Onitsha or Eastern variety that draws some influences from Igbo.

According to Obiechina (1984), Nigerian Pidgin English can be subdivided into five dialectal areas or variants;

- South West Pidgin – (Lagos, Ibadan, Etc.)
- South Central Pidgin – (Abraka, Warri, Sapele, Agbor, Etc.)
- Cross River Pidgin – (Calabar, Uyo, Ikot Ekpene, Obolo, Etc.)
- Eastern Pidgin – (Port Harcourt, Kalabari, Onitsha, Owerri, Aba, Etc.)
- Northern Pidgin – (Kaduna, Kano, Maiduguri, Jos Etc.)

Omamor (1992) however identifies only 4 varieties, viz: Lagos Pidgin, Port Harcourt Pidgin, Warri-Sapele-Benin Pidgin, and Northern Nigeria Pidgin.

== Lexical items and linguistic sources ==
Many of the 250 or more ethnic groups in Nigeria can converse in the language, though many speakers will infuse words from their native tongues, resulting in a variety of what can been described as 'ethnic Englishes'. As such, there are numerous words of Nigerian, other West African and Non-African origins in Nigerian pidgin, although the strongest influences and largest linguistic contributions into Nigerian pidgin and Nigerian English in general has been from the Yoruba language. The following table presents some examples:

Word	Source Language	Variant(s)	Meaning
Shebi	Yoruba — Ṣebí	Sebi	A word often used at the start or end of an interrogative sentence or question, e.g. 'Shebi you dey come?' means; "You are coming, right?"
Oyinbo	Yoruba	Oyibo	A white person; western products and mannerisms.
Abi	Yoruba		A close variation of Ṣebi, meaning; 'Isn't it', 'wouldn't it' and other interrogative or conjunctive negations. e.g 'E dey abi e no dey' means; "Is it available or not".
Una	Igbo — Ụnụ	Ona, Wuna	A plural second-person pronoun equivalent to the English term "you people". For example, 'Una dey mad' means "You people are crazy."
Biko	Igbo		Word meaning "please", For example, the sentence 'Free me biko' means; "Please leave me alone".
Oga	Yoruba — Ọ̀gá		Equivalent to the English term "boss, patron or mentor", has been adopted from the Yoruba word Ọ̀gá, e.g. 'My Oga dey come' means; "My boss is coming."
Oya	Yoruba — Ó yá		A Yoruba word that means 'Ready'. Used as a prompt or call to action, e.g Oya, make we commot abeg, means; "Okay, let's go please".
Ba	Hausa		Word used at the end of an interrogative sentence or question e.g. 'You no wan come, ba?' means; "You don't want to come, right?"
Sabi	Portuguese — Saber		Means ‘to know’ or have a skill. For example, 'I no sabi am.' means; "I don't know it."
Pikin	Portuguese — Pequeno		Means; "Small", "Small one". e.g., 'Wetin man pikin go do?' Means' "what will a man's child do?"
Palava	Portuguese — Palavra	Palaba	Originally meaning a tedious or long winded speech, it has taken on the new contextual meanings of problem, issue or trouble.
Wetin	English — What thing		A word meaning ‘What?’ e.g; 'Wetin be that?’ Means; "What is that?"
Commot	English — Come out	Comot, Komot	Come out, sometimes contextually taking the other meaning of; 'Leave', 'Get out' or 'Going'. e.g Abeg commot for road' means; "Get out of the way/Make way."
Jọ (Jor)	Yoruba — Jọwọ, Jọọ	Joor	Means please, but meaning depends on context; (dismissive, appealing, jovial etc). Often used as a final filler e.g 'Carry your wahala dey go joor' can mean: "Please leave with your troubles", dismissively or jovially. Another close and interchangeable Yoruba variant is 'Jare'
Domot	English — Door mouth	Dommot	A word that could mean; 'House/Abode' or 'Entrance' e.g 'Put am for her domot' means; "Put it in her house/at her door".
Japa	Yoruba	Jakpa, JP	The act of escaping, fleeing, or disappearing quickly from a situation. Emigration (contextually).
Sha	Yoruba	Sa, Shar	An intensifier or discourse particle used to add emotional depth or emphasis; "In short" e.g 'Your market too cost, but I go buy am sha.' Means; "your produce is too expensive, but I will buy it regardless."
Nkọ	Yoruba	Unko, Nkor	A word which means 'How about?' e.g 'Those people dem nko?' means; "How about those people?"
Wahala	Yoruba & Hausa	Wahalla	Word meaning 'Trouble' or 'Problem'. e.g 'Na which kain wahala be this', means; "What sort of trouble/problem is this?" Its use and meaning in NPE comes directly from Yoruba, but ultimately from Arabic — وهلة (Wahla) : Fear, Terror.
Boku	French — Beaucoup	Bokku	Means when something is much, surplus, many Etc. e.g 'Fish boku for market today.' means; "There was a lot of fish at the market."
Vamoose	Portuguese — Vamos	Vamus, Vamoos	A word meaning to get out or leave abruptly. e.g 'Before I tear eye, she don vamoose.' Means; "She was gone before I paid close attention."
Yanga	Mende — Nyanga, Yoruba — Yangàn, Hausa — Yàngá	Nyanga	Vanity or excessive pride, Ostentation. e.g 'That sisi too get yanga.' means; "That young lady is too prideful." Cognates have been found in several languages of West Africa. Comparable to the urban Yoruba Shakara.
Bọbọ	Vai	Borbor	A word used to describe a young boy or man whose name is unknown, a little boy. Can contextually mean a trendy young man, guy or boyfriend.
Patapata	Yoruba	Kpatakpata, Pata-pata	Completely, thoroughly, all-together, totally, fully e.t.c. e.g 'He don pack commot patapata' means; "He has completely moved out (of a building)".
Chook	Fulfulde — Jukka	Chuk	To pierce or poke with a sharp object. e.g 'Na the boy wey dem chook for belle be that' means; "That is the boy that was stabbed in the stomach."
Omo	Yoruba — Ọmọ		A Yoruba word that means 'Child', it has now become one of the most versatile words of Nigerian pidgin, filling a plethora of roles. Diverse uses, but mostly as an exclamation.
Lai Lai	Yoruba	Lailai	A Yoruba word that means 'Never'. Takes on the same meaning and uses in pidgin e.g 'Lai lai, we no go gree' means; "We will never agree"
Wayo	Hausa		Trickery, Stratagem, Cheating or Cunning. e.g 'The man play me wayo' means; The man tricked me. Similar to the Yoruba equivalent, Ojoro.
Aza	Edo		Bank account number or financial details. e.g 'Send your Aza make I press you moola' Means; "Send your account details so I can send you money"
Yẹyẹ	Yoruba		A Yoruba word that means 'A joke', something useless, or an unserious situation. Takes on the same meaning and uses in pidgin e.g 'Na which kain yeye pesin you be sef?' Means; "What sort of unserious/useless person are you?"
Korokoro	Yoruba	Koro-Koro	Clear view/vision, Face-to-face. e.g "As the matter take happen na for me Korokoro front' means; "Everything that transpired happened right in my presence/in front of me".
Worwor	Ewe — Vɔvɔ	Wowo	A word originally meaning; Panic, fear, woe, disorder, etc. taking on the contextual meaning of; Ugly, unattractive or unsightly. It can describe a person, object, or situation.

Nigerian Pidgin is most widely spoken in the oil-rich Niger Delta region, especially in the western sections (Warri-Sapele axis) where a lot of the population now speak it as a first language due to the region's high linguistic diversity and the lack of an indigenous lingua franca. There was heterogeneity all along Nigeria's coastal belt except for the western coast dominated by the Yoruba groups, which facilitated the spread of pidgin there as a communication utility tool. There are accounts of pidgin being spoken first in colonial Nigeria before being adopted by other countries along the West African coast.

While Pidgin is spoken by many, there are wide swathes of Nigeria where Pidgin is not spoken or understood, especially among those with neither secular education nor exposure in the far northern reaches of Nigeria.

== Relationship to other languages and dialects ==
=== Similarity to Caribbean Creoles ===
Nigerian Pidgin, along with the various pidgin and creole languages of West Africa, share multiple similarities to the various English-based Creoles found in the Caribbean. Linguists posit that this is because most of the enslaved that were taken to the New World were of West African descent. The pronunciation and accents often differ a great deal, mainly due to the extremely heterogeneous mix of African languages present in the West Indies, but if written on paper or spoken slowly, the creole languages of the Caribbean are for the most part mutually intelligible with the creole languages of West Africa.

The presence of repetitive phrases in Caribbean Creole such as su-su (gossip) and pyaa-pyaa (sickly) mirror the presence of such phrases in West African languages such as bam-bam, which means "complete" in the Yoruba language. Repetitious phrases are also very present in Nigerian Pidgin, such as koro-koro meaning "clear vision", yama-yama meaning "disgusting", and doti-doti meaning "garbage".

Words of West African origin in Surinamese Creole (Sranan Tongo) and Jamaican Patois, such as unu and Bajan dialect wunna or una – West African Pidgin (meaning "you people", a word that comes from the Igbo word unu or unuwa also meaning "you people"), display some of the interesting similarities between the English pidgins and creoles of West Africa and the English pidgins and creoles of the Caribbean, as does the presence of words and phrases that are identical in the languages on both sides of the Atlantic, such as Me a go tell dem (I'm going to tell them) and make we (let us).

A copula deh or dey is found in both Caribbean Creole and Nigerian Pidgin English. The phrase We dey foh London would be understood by both a speaker of Creole and a speaker of Nigerian Pidgin to mean "We are in London" (although the Jamaican is more likely to say Wi de a London and the Surinamese way is Wi de na London.) The word originates from the Igbo word di meaning the same thing and pronounced similarly: anu di na ofe (literally "meat is in soup") and anyi di na london (lit. "we are in London"). Other similarities, such as pikin (Nigerian Pidgin for "child") and pikney or pickney (used in islands like Jamaica, Saint Vincent, Antigua and St. Kitts, akin to the standard-English pejorative/epithet pickaninny) and chook (Nigerian Pidgin for "poke" or "stab") which corresponds with the Trinidadian creole word juk, and also corresponds to chook used in other West Indian islands.

=== Connection to Portuguese language ===
Being derived partly from the present day Edo/Delta and other south South area of Nigeria, there are still some words left over from the Portuguese language in pidgin English (Portuguese ships traded slaves from the Bight of Benin). For example, you sabi do am? means "do you know how to do it?". Sabi means "to know" or "to know how to", just as "to know" is saber in Portuguese. (According to the monogenetic theory of pidgins, sabir was a basic word in Mediterranean Lingua Franca, brought to West Africa through Portuguese pidgin. An English related word is savvy.) Also, pikin or "pickaninny" comes from the Portuguese words pequeno and pequenino, which mean "small" and "small child" respectively.

=== Nigerian English ===
Similar to the Caribbean Creole situation, Nigerian Pidgin is mostly used in informal conversations. Nigerian Pidgin has no status as an official language. Nigerian English is used in politics, education, science, and media. In Nigeria, English is acquired through formal education. As English has been in contact with multiple different languages in Nigeria, Nigerian English has become much more prominent and is very similar to both American and British English, and it is often referred to as a group of different sub-varieties. Although there is not a formal description of Nigerian English, scholars agree that Nigerian English is a recognizable and unique variety of English.

== Phonology ==
Nigerian Pidgin, like many pidgins and creoles, has a simpler phonology than the superstrate language. It has 23 consonants, seven vowels, and two tones.

=== Consonants ===
	Labial		Alveolar		Post- alveolar		Palatal	Velar		Labial–velar		Glottal
Nasal		m		n					ŋ			
Plosive	p	b	t	d				k	ɡ	kp	ɡb	
Affricate					tʃ	dʒ						
Tap				ɾ								
Fricative	f	v	s	z	ʃ							h
Approximant				l			j			w		

=== Vowels ===
	Front	Back
Close	i	u
High-mid	e	o
Low-mid	ɛ	ɔ
Open	a	

=== Tones ===
Nigerian Pidgin has been described as a tonal language, having a high tone and a low tone. The high tone can be written with an acute accent, and the low tone, though typically left unmarked, can be written with a grave accent. Additionally, monosyllabic high-tone words shift into a high falling tone before a pause.

Pidgin word (tones fully marked)	Tone pattern	English meaning
/bàbá/	LH	father
/bábà/	HL	Roman Catholic priest
/fádá/	HH	father
/fàdá/	LH	Roman Catholic 'father'
/sìsí/	LH	young maid
/sísì/	HL	sixpence (5 kobo)

However, this has been contested by subsequent linguists, due to variance in pitch intonation on lexemes, especially for questions. One rival suggestion is that Nigerian Pidgin "is something of a pitch-accent language in which, given a word there may be only one high tone, or one sequence thereof in opposition to one low sequence"; downdrift is attested in the intonational system.

Most written texts in Nigerian Pidgin do not show any tonal markings, and do not reflect any lexical pitch differences.

== Sample text ==
Article 1 of the Universal Declaration of Human Rights in Nigerian Pidgin:

Everi human being, nai dem born free and dem dey equal for dignity and di rights wey we get, as human beings, God come give us beta sense wey we de take tink well, well and beta mind, cos of dis, we must to treat each other like broda and sister.

Article 1 of the Universal Declaration of Human Rights in English:

All human beings are born free and equal in dignity and rights. They are endowed with reason and conscience and should act towards one another in a spirit of brotherhood.

== See also ==
- Krio
- Pichinglis
- Languages of Nigeria

== Bibliography ==
- Faraclas, Nicholas (1996). "Nigerian Pidgin" (PDF). New York: Routledge. ISBN 0-415-02291-6.
- Akhimien, Eronmonsele Pius (1 November 2004). "The use of 'How are you?' in Nigerian society". Journal of Pragmatics. 36 (11): 2055–2058. doi:10.1016/j.pragma.2004.02.003. ISSN 0378-2166.
- Mazzoli, Maria (2013). Copulas in Nigerian Pidgin (PDF) (Doctoral Thesis). Università degli studi di Padova. hdl:11577/3422599.
- Ihemere, Kelechukwu U. (31 December 2006). "A Basic Description and Analytic Treatment of Noun Clauses in Nigerian Pidgin" (PDF). Nordic Journal of African Studies. 15 (3): 296–313. doi:10.53228/njas.v15i3.29. ISSN 1459-9465. Archived from the original (PDF) on 10 June 2007.
- Mafeni, Bernard (1971). "Nigerian Pidgin". In Spencer, John (ed.). The English language in West Africa. London: Longman. pp. 95–112. ISBN 0582522153.
- Shnukal, Anna; Marchese, Lynell (1 January 1983). "Creolization of Nigerian Pidgin English: A progress report". English World-Wide. 4 (1): 17–26. doi:10.1075/eww.4.1.03shn. ISSN 0172-8865.
- Ernest Edgeren. 2009. "Single Language: The Soul Of Nations' Prosperity"
- Akande, Akinmade T.; Salami, Oladipo, eds. (25 October 2021). "Current Trends in Nigerian Pidgin English: A Sociolinguistic Perspective". Current Trends in Nigerian Pidgin English. Berlin, Boston: De Gruyter Mouton. doi:10.1515/9781501513541. ISBN 978-1-5015-1354-1.
- Ayenbi, Oti Frances Okpeyeaghan (13 December 2024). "Endangered minority language : a case study of the itsekiri language in Nigeria". Université de Strasbourg. Université de Strasbourg: 47.
