= Post-creole continuum =

Set of varieties of a creole language

A post-creole continuum (or simply creole continuum) is a dialect continuum of varieties of a creole language between those most and least similar to the superstrate language (that is, a closely related language whose speakers assert or asserted dominance of some sort). Due to social, political, and economic factors, a creole language can decreolize towards one of the languages from which it is descended, aligning its morphology, phonology, and syntax to the local standard of the dominant language but to different degrees depending on a speaker's status.

== Stratification ==
William Stewart, in 1965, proposed the terms acrolect, the highest or most prestigious variety on the continuum, and basilect, the lowest or least prestigious variety, as sociolinguistic labels for the upper and lower boundaries, respectively, of a post-creole speech continuum. In the early 1970s Derek Bickerton popularized these terms (as well as mesolect for intermediate points in the continuum) to refer to the phenomenon of code-switching used by some users of creole languages who also have some fluency in the standard language upon which the contact language is based. University of Chicago linguist Salikoko Mufwene explains the phenomenon of creole languages as "basilectalization" away from a standard, often European, language among a mixed European and non-European population. In certain speech communities, a continuum exists between speakers of a creole language and a related standard language. There are no discrete boundaries between the different varieties, and the situation in which such a continuum exists involves considerable social stratification.

The following table (from Bell 1976) shows the 18 different ways of rendering the phrase I gave him one in Guyanese English:

1	aɪ	ɡeɪv		hɪm	wʌn
2	aɪ	ɡeɪv		hɪm	wan
3	a	ɡeɪv		ɪm	wan
4	a	ɡeɪv		iː	wan
5	a	ɡɪv		hɪm	wan
6	a	ɡɪv		ɪm	wan
7	a	ɡɪv		iː	wan
8	a	dɪd	ɡɪv	iː	wan
9	a	dɪ	ɡɪ	iː	wan
10	a	dɪd	ɡɪ	iː	wan
11	a	dɪ	ɡiː	iː	wan
12	a	dɪ	ɡɪ	hiː	wan
13	mɪ	dɪ	ɡɪ	hiː	wan
14	mɪ	dɪ	ɡɪ	iː	wan
15	mɪ	bɪn	ɡɪ	iː	wan
16	mɪ	bɪn	ɡiː	iː	wan
17	mɪ	bɪn	ɡiː	æm	wan
18	mɪ	ɡiː		æm	wan

The continuum shown has the acrolect form as [aɪ ɡeɪv hɪm wʌn] (which is identical with Standard English) while the basilect form is [mɪ ɡiː æm wan]. Due to code-switching, most speakers have a command of a range in the continuum and, depending on social position, occupation, etc. can implement the different levels with various levels of skill.

If a society is so stratified as to have little to no contact between groups who speak the creole and those who speak the superstrate (dominant) language, a situation of diglossia occurs, rather than a continuum. Assigning separate and distinct functions for the two varieties will have the same effect. This is the case in Haiti with Haitian Creole and French.

Use of the terms acrolect, mesolect and basilect attempts to avoid the value judgement inherent in earlier terminology, by which the language spoken by the ruling classes in a capital city was defined as the "correct" or "pure" form while that spoken by the lower classes and inhabitants of outlying provinces was "a dialect" characterised as "incorrect", "impure" or "debased".

== Other examples ==
It has been suggested (Rickford 1977; Dillard 1972) that African American Vernacular English is a decreolized form of a slave creole. After emancipation, African-Americans' recognition and exercise of increased opportunities for interaction created a strong influence of Standard American English onto the speech of Black Americans so that a continuum exists today with Standard English as the acrolect and varieties closest to the original creole as the basilect.

In Jamaica, a continuum exists between Jamaican English and Jamaican Patois.

In Liberia, the acrolect is Liberian English, while the basilects are Kolokwa and Merico – the latter having become partially decreolized.

In Haiti, the acrolect is Haitian French and the basilect has been standardized as Haitian Creole.

Meanwhile, in southern Africa, Afrikaans is a codified mesolect, or a partial creole, with the acrolect (standard Dutch) stripped of official status decades ago, having been used for only religious purposes.
