= Akae Beka =

Roots reggae band from Saint Croix

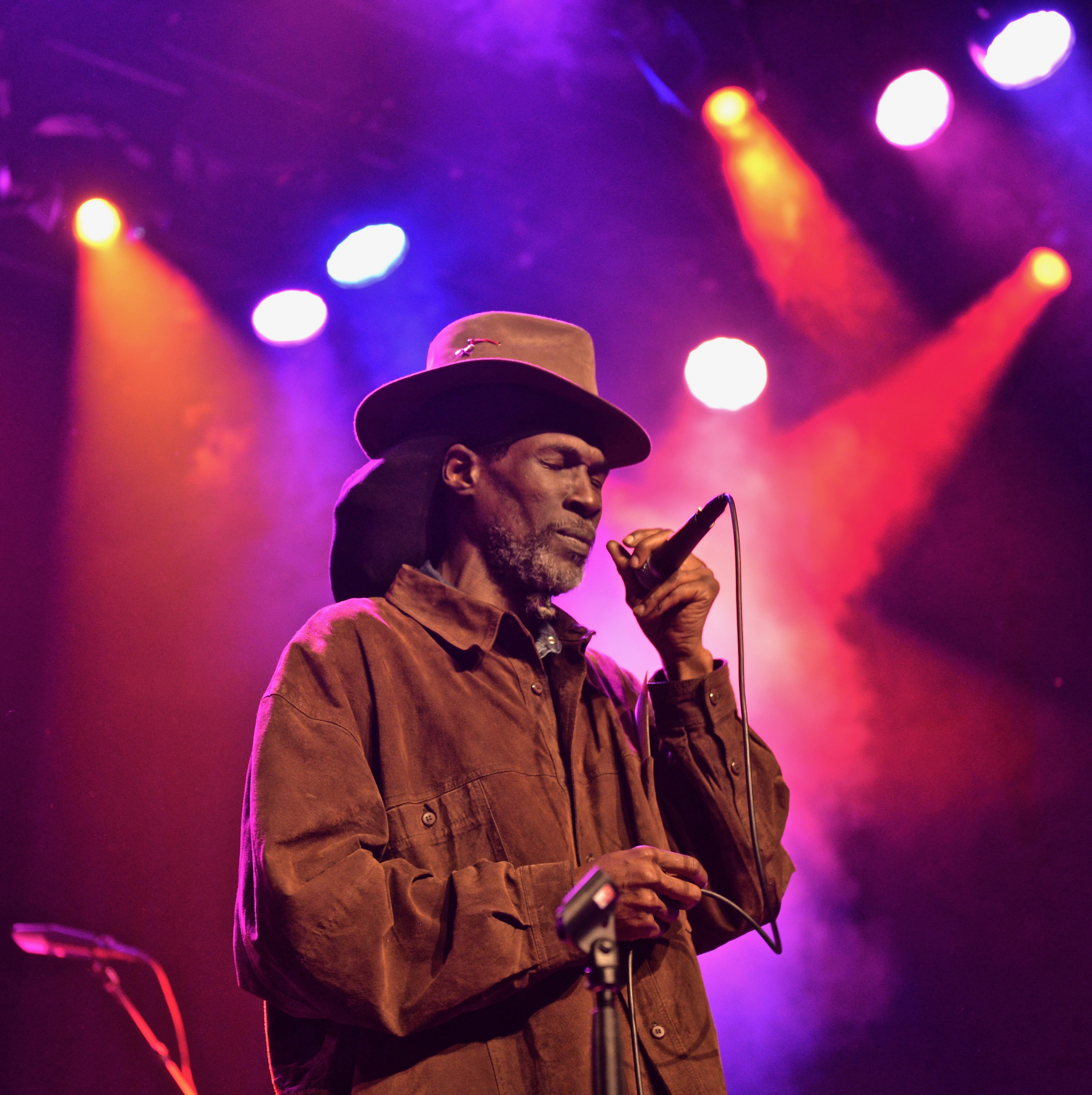
- Akae Beka live in Tilburg, May 11, 2017.

Background information
- Origin: Saint Croix, U.S. Virgin Islands
- Genre: Reggae roots
- Years active: 2015–2019
- Members: Vaughn Benjamin (vocals); Edmund Fieulleteau (guitar); Ras L (Bass); Peter Willock (Drums & Percussion); Suren Fenton (Keyboards); Junyah P (Keyboards); *Christian "Sly" Molina-Curet (Drums & Percussion) *Edwin "Kenny" Byron (guitar) *Abijah Hicks (guitar) *Legrand Lee (Guitar) *Andrew “Moon” Bain (guitar) *Ryan “Ishence” Willard (guitar) *Andrew "Drew Keys" Stoch (Keyboards)
- Website: www.akaebekamusic.com

Akae Beka is a roots reggae band who come from Saint Croix, U.S. Virgin Islands. The group was founded by members of the band Midnite, following a change in their membership in 2015. In February of that year, the former band Midnite cancelled their 2015 tour and postponed dates "due to a life changing medical emergency, convictions, and revelations".

== History ==
The band's leader Vaughn Benjamin explained that the name Akae Beka are two words that come from the Book of Enoch, cited in chapter 68, verse 20-24.

Akae Beka's first performance took place in Denver, Colorado on July 17, 2015, in honor of Nelson Mandela Day.

Benjamin died on November 4, 2019, in Port St Lucie, FL.

He was buried the following weeks in his birthplace of Antigua. Laid to rest on November 25, 2019, following a private family funeral. No cause of death has ever been released by the family or any members. .

== Legacy ==
On February 12, 2020, the Akae Beka band played its final tribute show at The Worldbeat cultural center in San Diego, Ca. Edmund Fieulleteau Performed vocals In Honor of Vaughn. It was also the same venue as the final show Performed with Vaughn 5 months prior on September 17, 2019.

In 2020, Protocols, a posthumous album, was released.

Many albums and collaborations still remain unreleased.

== Discography ==
- 2015 - Homage to The Land (FifthSon)
- 2016 - Portals (I Grade)
- 2016 - Loyalty (Single) (Iaahden Sounds)
- 2016 - New Page (Single) (Iaahden Sounds)
- 2016 - Livicated (Zion I Kings and I Grade Records)
- 2017 - Jahsaydo (Uhuru Boys)
- 2018 - Kings Dub (I Grade)
- 2018 - Nurtured Frequency (Haze St. Studios)
- 2018 - Topaz (Soundponics)
- 2019 - Hail The King (Higher Bound)
- 2019 - Mek A Menshun (Zion High)
- 2020 - Protocols (Iaahden Sounds)
- 2020 - The Spirit of Standing Up (Ras Elyment)
- 2021 - Righteous Synergy (FifthSon)
- 2021 - Polarities (I Grade)
- 2022 - Riddims composed by Vaughn Benjamin Recorded Oct 2019 (Trinity Farms)
- 2024 - Living Testament (Go A Chant)
- 2024 - The Akae Beka Scrolls (Go A Chant)
- 2024 - Living Testament in Dub (Go A Chant)
- 2026 - World Tap In (Higher Bound)
