= BBC News Pidgin =

Online news service in West African Pigdin English

BBC News Pidgin is an online news service in West African Pidgin English that was launched by the BBC World Service in 2017. It is based in Lagos, Nigeria.

== Background ==
=== Pidgin ===
Pidgin, or West African Pidgin English, is one of the most widely spoken languages in West Africa. Researchers in 2021 estimated that there were over 100 million speakers in Nigeria alone.^{:80} The language is used as a lingua franca across West Africa, and it has a number of common varieties including Nigerian Pidgin English, Ghanaian Pidgin English, and Cameroon Pidgin English.^{:79} By 2008, Nigerian Pidgin English was the most-spoken language across all varieties of creole or pidgin languages.^{:80}

Pidgin was first used by British and African slavers to facilitate the Atlantic slave trade in the late 17th century. It then grew to encompass a wide range of uses and vocabulary. It was stigmatised during colonisation and called a broken form of English: that perception has continued to the present in societal stereotypes about its speakers having a low education level. However, pidgin is now used by people across education levels and socioeconomic classes. It is not often officially condoned by institutions, but people use it both in unofficial and official environments.^{:79-81} West African Pidgin English is primarily a spoken language, with many sub-regional varieties, and by 2017 it did not have a standardised written form.^{:82}

=== BBC Pidgin standardisation ===
Because West African Pidgin English did not have a common written form in 2017, the BBC developed a "standardised" form of Pidgin aiming to serve all West African speakers. Researchers Folajimi Oyebola and Kingsley Ugwuanyi surmise that BBC's standardisation tends to favor the Nigerian Pidgin English variety more than other forms due to the news service's focus on Nigeria.^{:82} BBC's standardisation has certain traits not found in other forms, such as increased usage of inflections.

Oyebola and Ugwuanyi's 2023 survey of Nigerian university students who read BBC News Pidgin found that students appreciated BBC's version of pidgin, as well as its contribution toward unifying different pidgin varieties and giving them more official status. However, many students thought BBC's pidgin was a large departure from Nigerian Pidgin English. They commented that it was too formal and similar to Standard Nigerian English, rather than Nigerian Pidgin English.^{:94-97}

== Launch ==
BBC News Pidgin was launched in 2017 alongside ten other new language versions of BBC World Service. Together, this became BBC World Service's biggest expansion since the 1940s: it was enabled by a 2016 governmental funding increase to BBC. BBC already had services in English and Hausa to serve Nigeria, and planned to add Yoruba and Igbo services alongside Pidgin. BBC intended that the Pidgin service would be based out of Lagos, with reporters working from Nigeria, Ghana, and Cameroon.

== Reception ==
BBC News Pidgin was read by over 7.5 million people in its first year.^{:82} It served news online, on the radio, and on social media platforms like Facebook and Instagram that year. BBC reported in 2023 that its Pidgin service reached 2.3 million readers over the preceding year, a drop of 71% from the previous year. BBC's Yoruba and Indonesian news services lost readership at similar levels that year, and BBC's global traffic dropped about 10% overall.
