= Andrew Bain (singer) =

- Born: Andrew Bain
- Origin: London, UK
- Genre: Classical-Crossover
- Years active: 2008–present
- Label: Sony BMG
- Website: https://www.andrew-bain.com

Andrew Bain is a singer and dentist from London, England, who signed a £1 million record deal with SonyBMG.

Andrew became a practising NHS dentist when he was 24 in North London. Although he loved the community feeling that came from continued patient care, he put his dentistry career on hold to concentrate on his passion for music. Over the past 10 years as a dentist, Andrew fed his musical ambitions by using his holidays and spare time to sing in West-End choruses and amateur opera. His work included a tour with Cameron Mackintosh's production of Les Misérables in 1999 and Bill Kenwright's Whistle Down the Wind in 2002.

It was Andrew's version of the Prince (musician) classic "Purple Rain", sung in an operatic style, that got him signed. His debut album Andrew Bain Presents Modern Classics was released in March 2009. The album features covers of Snow Patrol's "Chasing Cars", ABBA's "The Winner Takes It All" and Aerosmith's "I Don't Want To Miss A Thing" sung in an operatic style.

== Discography ==
=== Albums ===
Andrew Bain Presents Modern Classics (album)

- Released: March 2009
- Label: Sony BMG
- Singles: Chasing Cars
