= Culture of the Virgin Islands =

Virgin Islander culture reflects the various peoples that have inhabited the present-day British Virgin Islands and U.S. Virgin Islands throughout history. Although the territories are politically separate, they maintain close cultural ties.

Like much of the English-speaking Caribbean, the Virgin Islands culture is syncretic, deriving chiefly from West African, European and Indigenous Caribbean influences. Though the Danish controlled the present-day U.S. Virgin Islands for many years, the very dominant language has been the Virgin Islands Creole, a creole that is English-based, since the 19th century, and the islands remain much more receptive to English-language popular culture than any other. The Dutch, the French, and the Danish also contributed elements to the islands' culture, as have immigrants from the Arab world, India, and other Caribbean islands. The single largest influence on modern Virgin Islander culture, however, comes from the Africans enslaved to work in cane fields from the 17th to the mid-19th century. These African slaves brought with them traditions from across a wide swathe of Africa, including what is now Nigeria, Senegal, both Congos (the RotC and the DRC), Gambia, and Ghana.

Virgin Islands culture continues to undergo creolization, the result of inter-Caribbean migration and cultural contact with other islands in the region, as well as the United States. Migration has altered the social landscape of both countries to the extent that in the British Virgin Islands, half of the population is of foreign (mostly Caribbean) origin and in the U.S. Virgin Islands, most native-born residents can trace their ancestry to other Caribbean islands.

== Language ==
The official language of both the U.S. and the British Virgin Islands is English. However, Virgin Islands Creole is mainly spoken in informal, daily usage. Due to immigration from other Caribbean islands, usage of Spanish and various French creoles have increased in the last few decades. Although the U.S. Virgin Islands was a Danish possession during most of its colonial history, Danish was never a spoken language amongst the populace, black or white, as the majority of plantation and slave owners were of Dutch, English, Scottish or Irish descent.

New anthology of Virgin Islands poetry (House of Nehesi Publishers)

== Literature ==
There has been a development of a Virgin Islands literature, although little studied. Literature is written in both standard English and Virgin Islands Creole English. Topics commonly explored in Virgin Islands literature include the cultural, historical, and political development of Virgin Islanders and various issues concerning colonialism and self-determination. Virgin Islands literature brings forth a diverse set of perspectives; many Virgin Islands writers have extensive ancestral roots in the islands, while others are expatriate long-term residents from the U.S. mainland and other Caribbean islands. Noted names in Virgin Islands literature, emanating particularly out of Tortola, Virgin Gorda, Anegada, Jost Van Dyke, are Alphaeus Osario Norman (1885-1942), Verna Penn Moll, Jennie Wheatley, and Patricia G. Turnbull. Their poetry and that of 22 other writers, including the fastly emerging poet and literary critic and Moko journal editor Richard Georges, can be found in Where I See the Sun – Contemporary Poetry in The Virgin Islands (Tortola, Virgin Gorda, Anegada, Jost Van Dyke), an anthology edited by Lasana M. Sekou in 2016. Ti Koko and Kush Kush by Patricia G. Turnbull, has been called a "magically" illustrated storybook contribution to Caribbean children's literature.

== Dance ==
In contemporary Virgin Islands society, there are various dance traditions, given its history of migration. The dances most commonly associated with indigenous Virgin Islander culture are the quadrille, which is also performed in many other Caribbean islands, and the bamboula. Other dances include bachata, merengue, and salsa, which were brought to the islands by immigrants from Puerto Rico and the Dominican Republic.

== Cuisine ==
Traditional food tends to be spicy and hearty. Many of the foods are imported due to an acquired taste for foreign foods. Local farmers grow fruits and vegetables along with the rearing of animals. Their goods are sold in local open-air markets, while supermarkets tend to carry only imported foods. Upscale restaurants often cater to tourists, serving a combination of North American dishes with tropical twists as well as local cuisine. An example of this is the addition of mango and Caribbean spices to salmon, a non-tropical fish.

=== Dishes ===
Fungi (pronounced foon-gee) is a main staple of the traditional Virgin Islands diet. It consists of cornmeal that has been boiled and cooked to a thick consistency along with okra. Fungi are usually eaten with boiled fish or saltfish.

Callaloo (sometimes spelled kallaloo) is a soup made from callaloo bush/leaf, often substituted with spinach. It consists of various meats and okra, and is boiled to a thick stew consistency.

Because of inter-Caribbean migration, many foods from other Caribbean countries have been adopted into the Virgin Islands culinary culture. For example, a popular dish is roti, of Indo-Trinidadian origin, which consists of curried vegetables and meat wrapped in a paper-thin dough.

=== Local fruits ===
Fruits consumed in the Virgin Islands include: sugar apple, mango, papaya, soursop, genip, sea grapes, tamarind (can be made in a sweet stew or rolled in sweet balls), and goose berries (small green sour fruit, smaller than a grape). These fruits are mainly stewed together with sugar for a sweet snack.

=== Drinks ===
Bush tea, a general term for any herbal tea derived from native plants (including lemongrass), is the hot beverage of choice in the Virgin Islands. Popular cold beverages include maubi, sorrel, soursop, sea moss and passion fruit. Drinks with ginger root are also popular.

=== Snacks ===
Paté (Pronounced PAH-TEH), fried dough filled with various meats including beef, chicken, conch, or saltfish stuffed inside is a popular snack (similar to an empanada). Another popular snack is Johnnycake (originally known as 'journey cake'), a pastry also made with fried dough.

== Sports ==
Americanization in the U.S. Virgin Islands has led to the preponderance of American sports such as baseball, American football and basketball, while sports more popular in the English-speaking Caribbean, such as cricket and association football, are also played.

Americanization in sports can be seen in the British Virgin Islands, as well. For example, basketball and baseball are much more widely played than cricket, one of the most popular sports in the Anglophone Caribbean.

Although dependent territories, the U.S. and British Virgin Islands both have their own independent national sports teams and compete in regional and international athletic events. In cricket, both territories are represented by the West Indies Cricket Team.

In 2012 the United States Virgin Islands Rugby Union was founded. The union is represented by a St. Thomas team, The Privateers, in exhibition and tournament competitions. The USVI Rugby Union is poised to join NACRA and IRB in the future. Rugby in the BVI was founded in 1965. It is administered by BVI RFU who has been an associate member of World Rugby since 2001 and is a full member of RAN (Rugby Americas North).

The Virgin Islands featured a men's national team in beach volleyball that competed at the 2018–2020 NORCECA Beach Volleyball Continental Cup.

== Religion ==
Christianity is the leading religion with a large Roman Catholic contingent along with various Protestant denominations. Like many other Caribbean islands, there is a significant Rastafari presence. A small number of practicing Muslims and Jews can also be found in the islands.

== Official fabric ==
Madras is a lightweight cotton fabric, traditionally woven with yarn-dyed, checked — tartan-like — patterns, often in bright colors. Originally from Madras (now Chennai), India, the textile became readily available in the Caribbean as a commodity imported and traded in association with the Atlantic slave trade. As a widely used fabric, with a long history in the islands, it was taken up by cultural groups, who began to campaign in the 1990s for a distinctive Virgin Islands pattern to be officially adopted. Already such a process had been undertaken in another Caribbean territory, when, in 1992, Antigua and Barbuda adopted a specially created madras as part of a new national costume. In 2019, the government of the United States Virgin Islands voted to adopt a madras created by textile designer Debbie Sun as the official madras of the territory. The new design was officially unveiled in June 2021.

The colors of the madras represent:

- yellow – for the official flower of the islands, the yellow cedar or 'ginger Thomas' (Tecoma stans)
- red – for strength and love, a color that has appeared in the various flags flown over the islands in their history
- green – for the fields of the islands and their natural resources
- pink – for conch shells which represent a call to freedom
- blue – for the oceans and the deep seas of the ports, representing the history of maritime transport in the islands
- turquoise – for the waters surrounding the island, representing the islands' natural beauty
- white – in acknowledgement of the traditional dresses originally made from flour sacks

The new design is a way for local cultural performers to show their pride for their home while performing traditional dances. It is intended to be a unified "branding" symbol for the islands.

== See also ==
- Virgin Islands Creole
