= WSTX (AM) =

Radio station in Christiansted, US Virgin Islands

- Christiansted, U.S. Virgin Islands; United States
- Frequency: 970 kHz
- Branding: News Talk AM 970

Programming
- Format: Talk (days); Calypso and Quelbe (nights)
- Affiliations: BBC Radio

Ownership
- Owner: Caledonia Communication Corporation
- Sister stations: WSTX-FM

History
- First air date: 1971

Technical information
- Licensing authority: FCC
- Facility ID: 20589
- Class: B
- Power: 5,000 watts (day); 1,000 watts (night)
- Transmitter coordinates: 17°45′23″N 64°41′38″W

Links
- Public license information: Public file; LMS
- Webcast: Listen live
- Website: wstxradio.com

WSTX (970 AM) is a commercial radio station licensed to Christiansted, U.S. Virgin Islands. It airs a format of talk shows by day, with Calypso and Quelbe music at night. Many of the talk shows are hosted by community leaders and elected officials, who are on the station once a week. On Sunday, religious shows and urban gospel music are heard.

The station is owned by Caledonia Communication Corporation, a corporation whose majority shareholder, Kevin A. Rames, is an attorney based on St. Croix, U.S. Virgin Islands. Caledonia Communication Corporation purchased the radio station from Family Broadcasting, Inc. on November 19, 2010. The station owns and utilizes the tradename "The Most Powerful Voice in Talk".

WSTX has been assigned these call letters by the Federal Communications Commission since it was initially licensed.
