= Richard Elizalde =

American judoka

Medal record

Men's Judo

Representing United States

US National Championships
| Bronze medal – third place | US National Championships | 1983 |

Richard " Blinky" Elizalde is an American judoka, coach and former competitor.

== Martial arts ==
In 1972, Elizalde placed 5th at the National Collegiate 205 lbs division. In 1983, Elizalde competed in the US National Championships placing third and taking the bronze medal. Elizalde twice qualified as an Olympic alternate, which is generally considered to be the peak achievement of his career. Elizalde is currently a 5th degree black belt in judo.

== Coaching career ==
Elizalde was the coach of former world champion Ann Marie Burns. He was also the judo coach of 2008 Olympic Bronze medalist Ronda Rousey. Elizalde has coached over 15 international champions. Elizalde has additionally coached and trained over 50 US Junior and Senior National Champions. Elizalde has been a featured demonstrator in the United States Judo Associations Growing Judo Magazine of the technique Keylock Sankaku Jime. Elizalde is currently the head judo instructor at UCLA.
