= West African Pidgin English =

Creole language

- Native to: Nigeria, Cameroon, Ghana, Equatorial Guinea
- Native speakers: 75,000,000 (2017)
- Language family: Creole of African languages, lexified by English: Guinea Coast; West African Pidgin English
- Writing system: Latin script

Language codes
- ISO 639-3: –
- Glottolog: west2851
- Linguasphere: 52-ABB-b
- IETF: cpe-011

West African Pidgin English, also known as Guinea Coast Creole English or shortly as Broken (Broken English), is a West African pidgin language lexified by English and local African languages. It originated as a language of commerce between colonizing British and African slave traders during the period of the trans-Atlantic slave trade. As of 2017, about 75 million people in Nigeria, Cameroon, Ghana and Equatorial Guinea used the language.

Because it is primarily a spoken language, there is no standardized written form, and many local varieties exist. These include Sierra Leone Krio, Nigerian Pidgin, Ghanaian Pidgin English, Cameroonian Pidgin English, Liberian Kolokwa English, the Aku dialect of Krio, and Pichinglis.

== History ==
West African Pidgin English arose during the period of the transatlantic slave trade as a language of commerce between British colonizers and African slave traders. Portuguese merchants were the first Europeans to trade in West Africa beginning in the 15th century, and West African Pidgin English contains numerous words of Portuguese origin such as sabi ('to know'), a derivation of the Portuguese saber. Later, as British merchants arrived to engage in the slave trade, they developed this language in combination with local African slave traders in order to facilitate their commercial exchanges.

The language quickly spread up the river systems into the West African interior because of its value as a trade language among Africans of different tribes. Later in the language's history, this useful trading language was adopted as a native language by new communities of Africans and mixed-race people living in coastal slave trading bases such as James Island, Bunce Island, Elmina Castle, Cape Coast Castle and Anomabu. At that point, it became a creole language.

Some scholars call this language "West African Pidgin English" to emphasize its role as a lingua franca pidgin used for trading. Others call it "Guinea Coast Creole English" to emphasize its role as a creole native language spoken in and around the coastal slave castles and slave trading centers by people permanently based there. The existence of this influential language during the slave trade era is attested by the many descriptions of it recorded by early European travelers and slave traders. They called it the "Coast English" or the "Coast Jargon".

A British slave trader in Sierra Leone, John Matthews, mentioned pidgin English in a letter he later published in a book titled A Voyage to the River Sierra-Leone on the Coast of Africa. Matthews refers to West African Pidgin English as a "jargon", and he warns Europeans coming to Africa that they will fail to understand the Africans unless they recognize that there are significant differences between English and the coastal pidgin:

Those who visit Africa in a cursory manner ... are very liable to be mistaken in the meaning of the natives from want of knowledge in their language, or in the jargon of such of them as reside upon the sea-coast and speak a little English; the European affixing the same ideas to the words spoken by the African, as if they were pronounced by one of his own nation. [This] is a specimen of the conversation which generally passes.

Matthews supplied an example of West African Pidgin English:

Well, my friend, you got trade today; you got plenty of slaves?
No, we no got trade yet; by and by trade come. You can’t go.
What you go for catch people, you go for make war?
Yes, my brother … gone for catch people; or they gone for make war.

=== Modern Africa ===
West African Pidgin English remained in use in West Africa following the abolition of the trans-Atlantic slave trade by Western nations in the 19th-century and the subsequent decolonization of Africa. Many distinct regional variants of the language emerged. Looked down upon during the colonial era as a bastardization of proper English – a stigma still attached to it by some – Pidgin nonetheless remains in widespread use. In 2016, there were an estimated five million individuals who use Pidgin as a primary language for everyday use in Nigeria.

As of 2017, about 75 million people in Nigeria, Cameroon, Ghana and Equatorial Guinea speak the language. During the rise of African nationalism, it became a "language of resistance and anti-colonialism", and political activists still use it to criticize their post-colonial political leaders.

Over the last hundred years the amount of English-lexifer based creoles in West African countries currently being used as primary and secondary language has increased greatly, with speakers currently exceeding one hundred million.

Because West African Pidgin English is primarily a spoken language, there is no standardized written form, and many local varieties exist. In August 2017, the BBC launched a Pidgin news service, aimed at audiences in West and Central Africa, as part of its World Service branch. As part of that effort, the BBC developed a guide for a standardized written form of pidgin.

== See also ==
- Languages of Africa
- Ian Hancock, linguist and scholar of pidgin and creole languages
