= Sylvester McIntosh =

Crucian singer and bandleader (1934–2017)

Sylvester Ivan McIntosh (August 17, 1934 – November 11, 2017), also known as Blinky, was a Crucian singer and bandleader. He was the founder and frontman of the band Blinky & the Roadmasters.

== Early life ==
McIntosh was born on August 17, 1934, in Frederiksted, St. Croix, in the United States Virgin Islands. His father, Ivan McIntosh, was an accomplished saxophonist, and his mother, Ethel McIntosh, worked at home. Ethel is credited with teaching her son the traditional melodies of the Crucian people, while Ivan taught him his first musical scale when he was twelve. Shortly thereafter, he joined a local "scratch band", and by the age of fifteen, he was playing guitar in his father's band, the Merry Makers. During his stint in this band, he toured all over St. Croix and became very familiar with his father's songs. As a child, he also joined the masquerade troupe Wild Indians, which had a major role in organizing local carnivals.

== Later career ==
McIntosh founded his first band, the Pond Bush Hot Shots, in the mid-1950s. He played guitar in the band, which was named after the Pond Bush neighborhood of Frederiksted where they originated. McIntosh went on to found the Clefs, in which he also played guitar. In the 1960s, he joined the quadrille band the Joe Parris Hot Shots as their lead saxophonist, and he recorded three albums with Parris during the 1970s. Later in the decade, he played with Jamsie and the Happy Seven before founding Blinky & the Roadmasters. He named himself "Blinky" after the cartoon character Blinky McQuade, and the band "the Roadmasters" because he worked for the St. Croix Department of Public Works at the time. In 1987, he was awarded a National Heritage Fellowship from the National Endowment for the Arts. Blinky & the Roadmasters released the album Crucian Scratch Band Music on Rounder Records in 1990, and they performed in the cult classic film Captain Ron in 1992. McIntosh retired from his job at the St. Croix Department of Public Works in December 1993, after working there for forty-one years. He and his band continued to perform traditional Crucian music at local events thereafter.

== Personal life and death ==
McIntosh was the father of seven children. He died on November 11, 2017.
