= Dezarie =

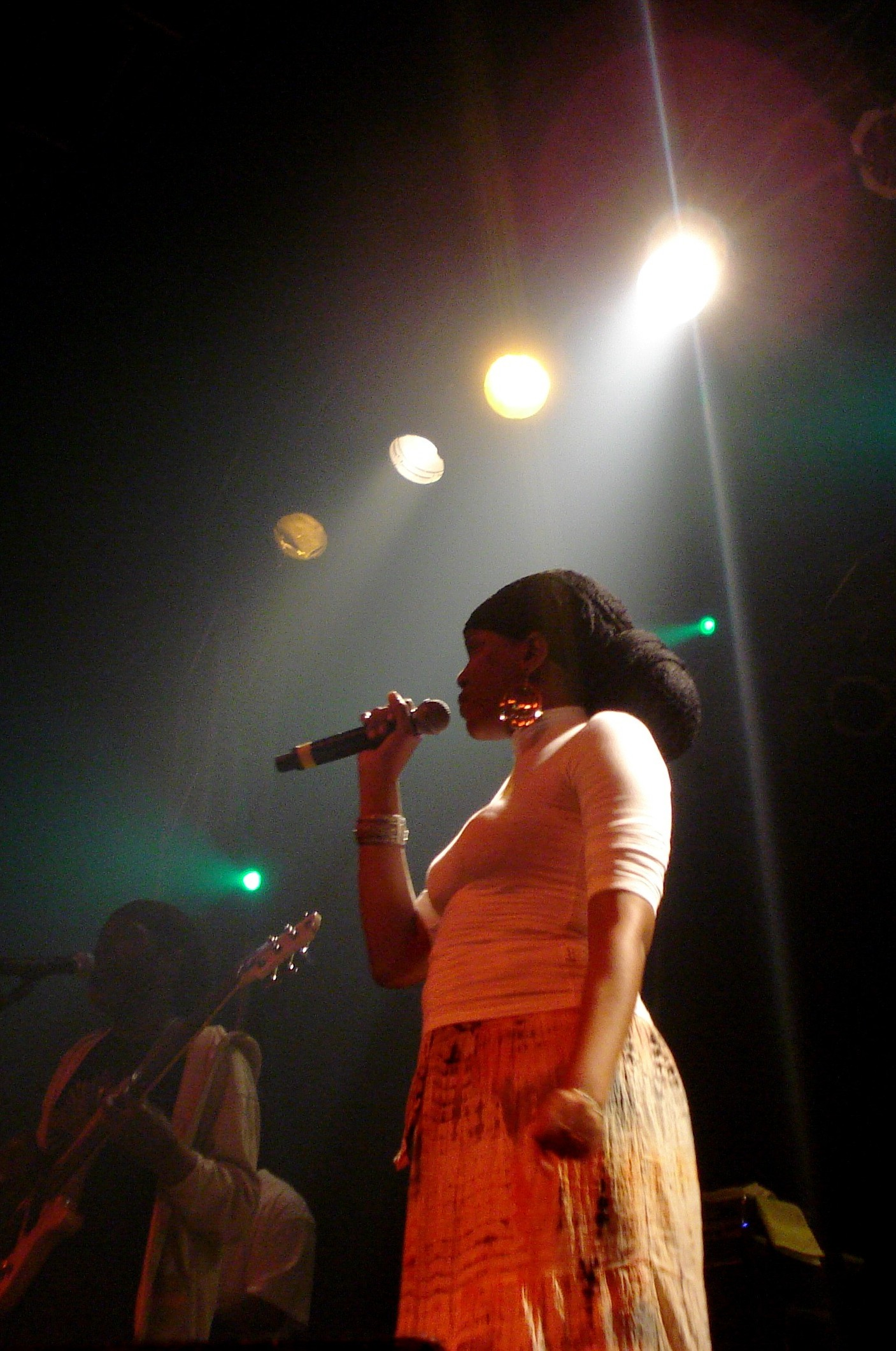
- Dezarie backed by Midnite in Brazil, in the state of Rio Grande do Sul, Porto Alegre Capital, south extreme of the country.

Background information
- Born: Saint Croix, U.S. Virgin Islands
- Genre: Reggae
- Occupations: Singer-songwriter, musician
- Instrument: Vocals

Dezarie is a female roots reggae singer born in St. Croix, U.S. Virgin Islands. She received Atlanta's "Best New Female Reggae Artist" award in 2001 before returning to St. Croix.

She works closely with Midnite. She currently has five albums available. They are entitled Fya (I Grade Records), Gracious Mama Africa, Eaze The Pain, The Fourth Book and her most recent is entitled "Love in Your Meditation".

In 2002 she collaborated with Bambu Station on Talking Roots volume 1 album on song Woe.

== Discography ==
Fya (2001)

- 01. Zion
- 02. Omega
- 03. Don't Cry
- 04. Most High
- 05. Love Yourself
- 06. Flesh and Bone
- 07. Fya
- 08. All Ova
- 09. Walk Wid Me
- 10. Rebel
- 11. Jah Throne
- 12. Mind Yu Own
- 13. Sing Out
- 14. Iron Sharpen Iron
- 15. Fya Dub

Gracious Mama Africa (2003)

- 01. Gone Down
- 02. Poverty
- 03. Not one penny
- 04. Strengthen your mind
- 05. Law Fe de Outlaw
- 06. Justice
- 07. Gracious Mama Africa
- 08. Exhalt
- 09. Mother and Child
- 10. Travelers
- 11. Slew dem an done
- 12. Judgment come

Eaze The Pain (2008)

- 01. Hail Jah
- 02. What A Mornin
- 03. Always Remember You
- 04. Eaze The Pain (Redemption)
- 05. Real Luv
- 06. Concern
- 07. Angels
- 08. Set Da Flame
- 09. The Truth
- 10. Anotha Revolution
- 11. For The People By The People
- 12. Ras Tafari

The Fourth Book (2010)

- 01. Jah Know Better
- 02. Tryin To Be God
- 03. Ghettos Of Babylon
- 04. Everyday
- 05. Children Of The Most High
- 06. Foolin Yourself
- 07. Roots & Culture
- 08. Not Yours
- 09. Defend Right
- 10. Holy Of Holies

Love in Your Meditation (2014)

- 01. Love in Your Meditation
- 02. Download De Criminal
- 03. Worthy Was She
- 04. Not Who We Are To Be
- 05. African Heart Lionheart
- 06. Return To Sender
- 07. Stronger
- 08. Keep Praising Jah
- 09. How Great Thou Art
- 10. Constructing Destruction
- 11. Things Won't Be The Same
- 12. Living Ones
