= Bamboula =

Word in reference to a type of drum, dance, rhythm, and ethnic slur

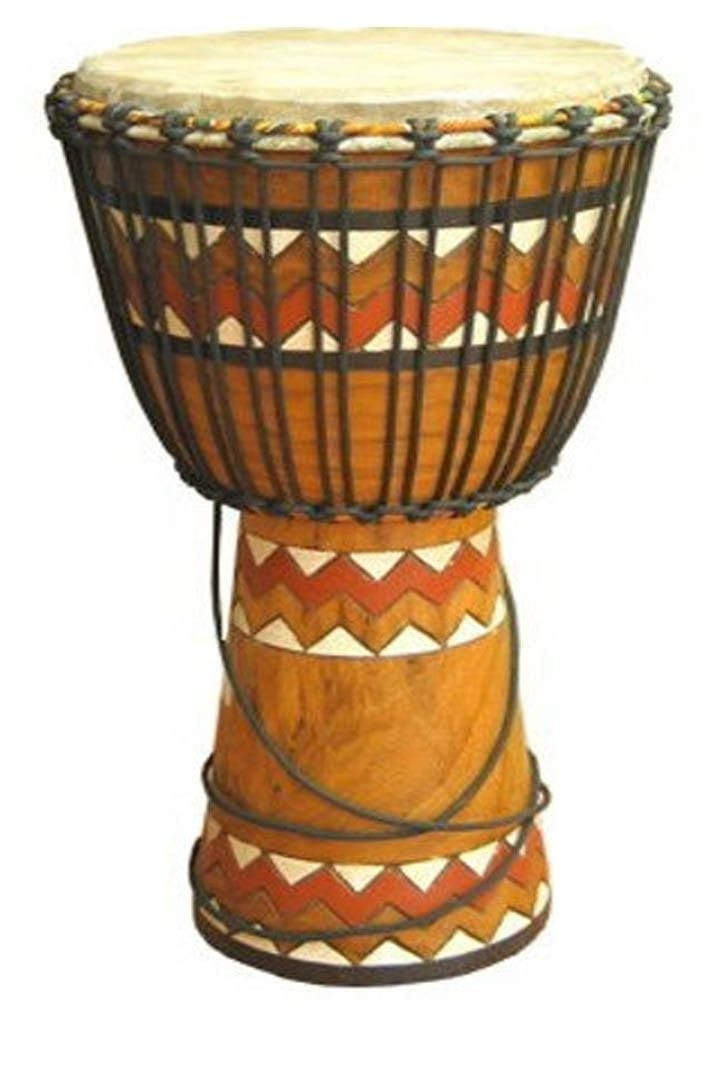

Percussion instrument
- Classification: Membranophone
- Hornbostel–Sachs classification: 211.212.1 (Cylindrical drums)

A bamboula is a West African-derived rhythm, dance, and percussion instrument or type of drum made from a rum barrel with skin stretched over one end. It is also a dance accompanied by music from these drums.

== Etymology ==
The term is derived from 2 languages spoken in Portuguese Guinea:

- the Sarar or Sadal, ka-mombuloñ;(probably Serer language)
- Bola (Bwlama, Juan or Jual) word, kam-bumbulu (probably Jola-Fonyi)

Both of which mean drum.

== History ==
=== As a dance ===
Bamboula
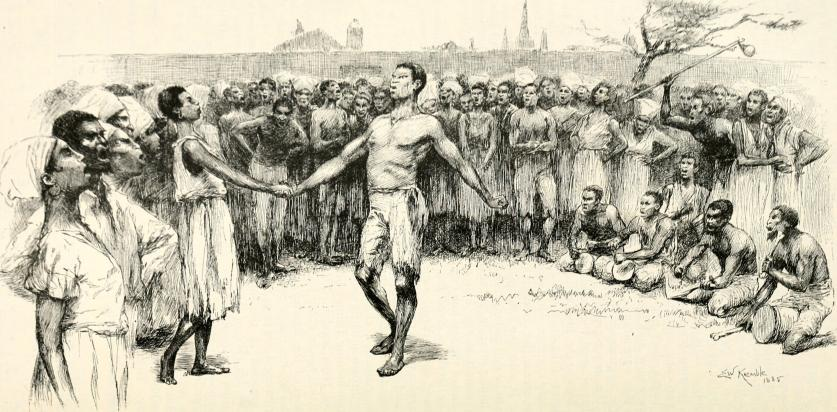
- Native name: Bamboula
- Etymology: Jola-Fonyi: Drum Serer: Drum
- Genre: Folk music
- Tempo: 3+3+2 pattern
- Instrument: Bamboula drums
- Origin: West Africa, Central African Republic region
- Related dances: Bélé Calinda Capoeira

Originating in Africa, the bamboula form appears in a Haitian song in 1757 and bamboula became a dance syncopation performed to the rhythm of the drum during festivals and ceremonies in Haiti (then Saint-Domingue). It was then exported to the United States (notably Mobile, Alabama, and the Virgin Islands) through Louisiana, by the slaves who were deported to New Orleans during the 18th century with the arrival of the displaced French settlers of the island of San Domingo especially after the Haitian Revolution. The slaves congregated on the Congo Square at the edge of the area of the French Quarter of New Orleans to dance the bamboula. From fear of inciting insurrection, on Aug. 8, 1672, Gov. Jorgen Iversen banned bamboula dancing on the island of St. Thomas

=== As a rhythm ===
The "bamboula rhythm" is foundational to New Orleans music, including jazz and second line. It is characterized by a 3+3+2 polyrhythmic pattern. Stanton Moore referred to it as the Haitian cinquillo. "Moore wrote that this Mardi Gras Indian rhythm (the bamboula "Haitian bell rhythm") can be traced back to the Indians' Haitian roots. Similarly, Moore referred to the 3+3+2 pattern (the bass drum rhythm in Figure 2) as the Haitian tresillo." -Robert J. Damm

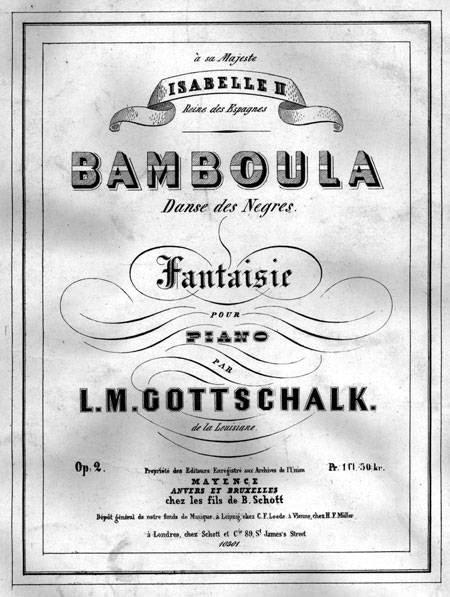
Title page of "Bamboula", a work for piano by the Franco-Louisianian Louis Moreau Gottschalk.

In 1848, the American composer Louis Moreau Gottschalk, born in New Orleans, Louisiana, and whose maternal grandmother was a native of Saint-Domingue, composed a piece entitled Bamboula, the first of four Creole inspired piano works known as his Louisiana Quartet.

=== As an ethnic slur ===
In the present-day French language, the word bamboula has become an ethnic slur, directed at black people.
