= Decreolization =

Hypothetical linguistic process

Decreolization is a postulated phenomenon whereby over time a creole language reconverges with the lexifier from which it originally derived. The notion has attracted criticism from linguists who argue there is little theoretical or empirical basis on which to postulate a process of language change which is particular to creole languages.

== Overview ==
Decreolization is a process of language change a creole language may undergo when in contact with its lexifier. As languages remain in contact over time, they typically influence one another, especially if one holds higher linguistic prestige. In the context of creole languages, the lexifier tends to have higher prestige (though not always) and will exert a much greater influence on the creole, which has lower prestige. This leads to the reintroduction of linguistic material into the creole from the lexifier. Decreolization predicts that eventually the creole will resemble the lexifier to such a degree that it could then be called a dialect of that language rather than a separate language at all. According to Peter Trudgill, if one views pidginization as a process of simplification, reduction, and admixture from substrate languages, and creolization as the expansion of the language to combat reduction, then one can view decreolization as an 'attack' on both simplification and admixture.

One possible case of decreolization that can be considered is that of the Portuguese language in Goa, a former colony of the Portuguese Empire. According to Rita Marquilhas (1998), in places that remained under Portuguese administration until the mid-20th century, such as Goa, there was a ‘decreolization,’ as various structures of the language gradually came closer to the Portuguese spoken in Portugal, leaving only traces in what is now the variety of Portuguese spoken by some Goan communities.

== Criticism ==
Decreolization has been criticized by some linguists as lacking empirical and theoretical support. For example, Michel DeGraff writes:

"... it has not been rigorously defined what structural process is inverted or what structural properties are removed by this decreolization process. ... What historical linguists outside of creolistics study is language change, be it contact-induced or not, and language change is a process that is presumably based on universal psycholinguistic mechanisms that do not leave room for a sui generis process of (de)creolization."

In other words, as other linguists have argued, there is no a priori reason to posit a special process of language change specific to creole languages. Furthermore, it has been shown that linguistic changes resulting from contact between a creole and its lexifier do not always emerge in the way decreolization would predict. For example, changes such as grammaticalization may occur which result in the creole diverging from its lexifier.

== See also ==
- Prestige language
- Cultural cringe
- Language attrition
- Dialect levelling
- Post-creole continuum
- Linguistic imperialism
