= Fungi (music) =

Musical style from British Virgin Islands

Fungi is the name given to the local musical form of the British Virgin Islands. It is also the native music of the U.S. Virgin Islands, where it is known as quelbe. Fungi music is an expression of Virgin Islands culture as it shows the islands' African and European influences in a unique sound. The name fungi comes from a local dish of the same name. It is a cornmeal-based food which is made with different ingredients including okra, onions, and green peppers, and is sometimes served plain. This "cook-up" which is a savoury fusion of different flavors creates something new. Similarly, Fungi music is a blend of many different instruments and styles. A fungi band is based on the fusion of a wide range of instruments, many of which are homemade. The beat of the double bass is usually the base for a colourful mix of sounds and instruments.

== The Fungi Band ==
The components of a fungi band or "scratch band" include:

- Ukulele
- Banjo
- Bongos
- Guitar
- Bouble bass or bass guitar
- Keyboard
- Calabash
- Güiro
- Washboard
- Triangle
- Saxophone

== Themes ==
Themes explored in fungi music include love and relationship, folklore, the basis of Virgin Islander oral history, on topics ranging from church life to smuggling rum as well as current events and social commentary.

== Mood ==
Fungi music is usually very festive, even humorous, as it is made for dancing. Band perform at a variety of events including weddings, festivals, parties as well as in restaurants and hotels.

There is a definite melody and rhythm and the lyrics are meaningful, as the songs tell stories from the past. These stories are reminders of the life the people of the British Virgin Islands lived. In the British Virgin Islands, fungi music is popular during such events as the British Virgin Islands Music Festival and in both the U.S. and British Virgin Islands, the music is part of the school curriculum.

== Fungi artists ==
Notable fungi artists are educator-turned politician Elmore Stoutt who is regarded as the Fungi Master and the legendary Lashing Dogs.

== See also ==
- Music of the Virgin Islands
