= Midnite (band) =

American roots reggae band

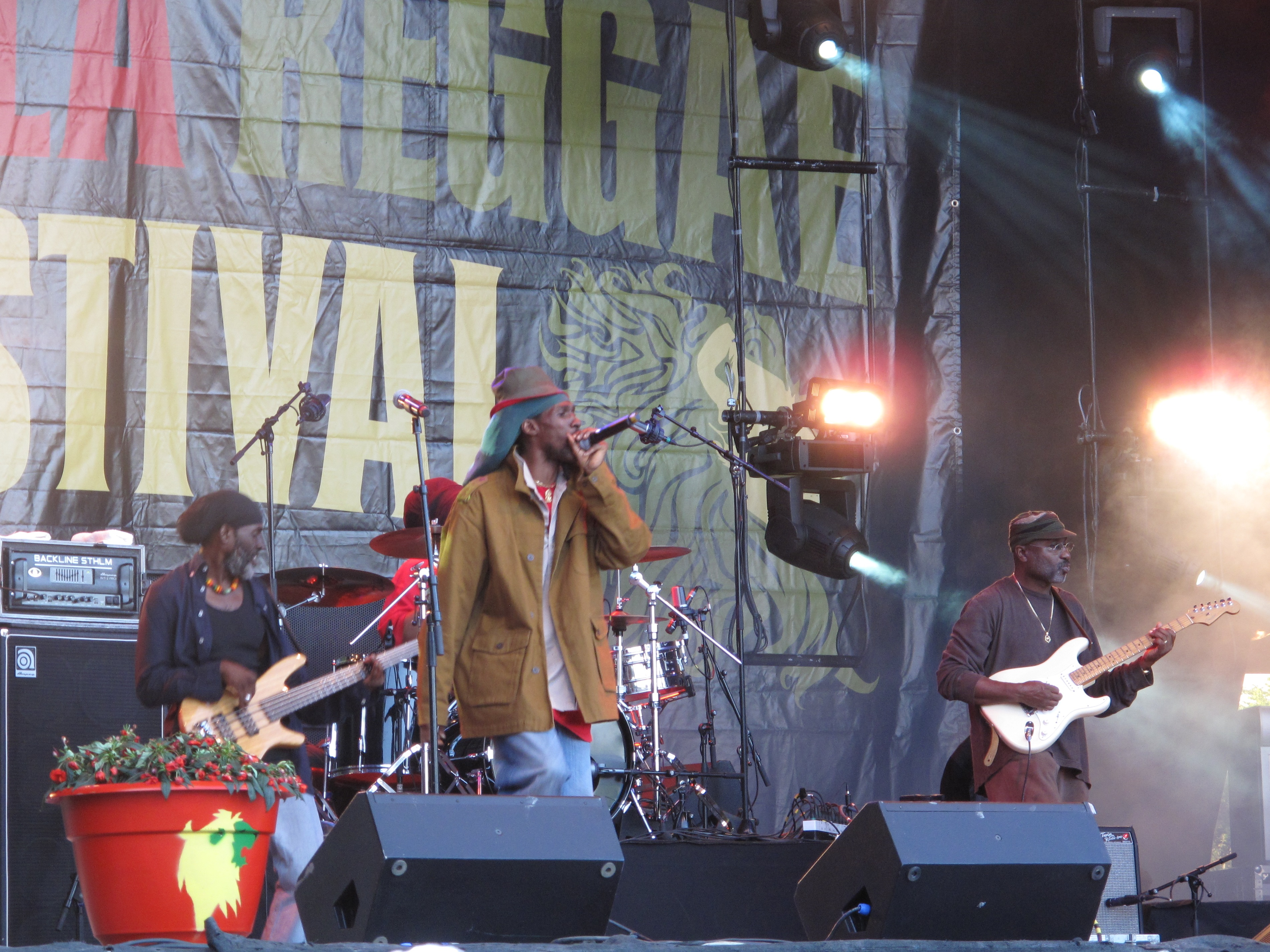

Background information
- Origin: St. Croix, U.S. Virgin Islands
- Genres: Reggae
- Years active: 1989–2015
- Labels: Rastafaria, I Grade Records
- Members: Vaughn Benjamin; Ron Benjamin; Christian Molina; Edmund Fieulleteau; Edwin Byron; Ras L
- Past members: Tuff Lion, Dion Hopkins, Abijah Hicks, Philip Merchant, Kenny
- Website: www.akaebeka.com

Midnite was a roots reggae band from St. Croix, U.S. Virgin Islands, which started playing in 1989.

The band's music follows in tradition with the roots reggae bands of 1970s Jamaica. The lyrical portions of Midnite's compositions are characterized as the "chant and call" style which gives their music a spiritually intense and an overtly Rastafari movement feel. The lyrics are centrally focused on the plights of the oppressed, the inherent faults of the current political, economic and social settings on a global scale, and the redemption available to mankind through a life dedicated to Jah.

In 2015, the band reformed around co-founder Vaughn Benjamin as Akae Beka without bassist Ron Benjamin. Ras Elyments took Ron Benjamin's position on Bass. Suren “SoulJah” Fenton replaced Ras L on keys. The reasons for the reformation have been stated as due to "life changes, convictions and revelations". Stated on the band website was "due to a medical emergency the tour is postponed". Members of the band themselves won't even say during the recent Akae Beka Coronation Tour in November 2015. '. Akae Beka's first performance took place in Denver, Colorado on July 17, 2015, in honor of Nelson Mandela Day.

== History ==
The band was started by Benjamin brothers Vaughn (vocals) and Ron (keyboard, but later switched to bass) circa 1989 according to an interview with one of the former Midnite drummer Ambrose "Amby" Connor by Midnight Raver. Vaughn and Ron invited Joseph Straws Jr. to be their bassist and Dion "Bosie" Hopkins was the original drummer. The rhythm section was original as was all of Midnite's music—no covers or already created rhythms. The brothers were raised in St. Croix, Virgin Islands, the sons of Antiguan musician Ronnie Benjamin Sr. Vaughn Benjamin cites Bob Marley, Peter Tosh, Bunny Wailer, The Abyssinians, and bassist Flabba Holt as his earliest influences.

"Bob Marley has had a big impact. And the drum and the bass from like Flabba Holt. Sometimes I listen to the bass man alone or the drummer alone."

The group's debut album Unpolished was released exclusively in Namibia in December 1997. The album would not see a proper U.S. release until the Rastafaria label released it wide in 2001. They recorded Ras Mek Peace (Before Reverb and Without Delay) while living in Washington, D.C. during the mid-90s, and it was released in November 1999. The album was named so, because it was reportedly recorded live in one room, straight to two-track analog tape. It was mastered without the use of compression or corrective equalization. Ras Mek Peace (Before Reverb and Without Delay) is recorded using no mixing board, no filtering, no compression, no equalization, no noise reduction, multitracking or overdubbing, giving it a raw sound. The album was recorded using only two-tracks at Mapleshade in Upper Marlboro, MD with studio engineer and owner Pierre Sprey whose recording style is summed up in the phrase he had printed to green Mapleshade T-shirts to promote the studio: NO Mixing Board, NO Overdubs, NO Noise Reduction, NO Compression, NO Multitracks, NO Reverb, NO EQ, Nothing BUT The Excitement of Live Music, MUSIC WITHOUT COMPROMISE.

Later, they returned home to St. Croix in the late '90s to play with local musicians and record at their music studio, Afrikan Roots Lab.

Midnite frequently collaborates with new artists and has played as the back-up band on a number of Afrikan Roots Lab artists' releases, such as Dezarie's Fya and Gracious Mama Africa and Ikahba's Trodding to Zion.

In September 2011, Midnite released their first professionally produced music video for their song "Mongst I&I". The video features members of the band in casual settings and depicts the Rastafarian culture in Frederiksted, United States Virgin Islands (referred to as "Freedom City," St. Croix), and Kingston, Jamaica.

Singer Vaughn Benjamin featured on Tribal Seeds' 2014 album Representing.

The band was featured in the 2014 documentary film Escape To St Croix.

Vaughn Benjamin died in Port St. Lucie, Florida, on November 4, 2019, at the age of 50.

== Critical acclaim ==
In its Top 50 Reggae Albums of the 2K list, reggae news and information website Midnight Raver ranked Midnite's Jubilees of Zion as the best album of the new millennium and Beauty for Ashes as the third best. In its review of Akae Beka's Homage to the Land, Midnight Raver referred to Midnite as "the most revered, influential and prolific reggae act in two decades."

== Discography ==
- 1997 - Unpolished
- 1999 - Ras Mek Peace
- 2000 - Jubilees Of Zion
- 2002 - Seek Knowledge Before Vengeance
- 2003 - Intense Pressure (dub)
- 2004 - Scheme A Things
- 2004 - Ainshant Maps
- 2008 - Live 94117
- 2010 - What Makes A King ?
- 2011 - Anthology
- 2013 - Lion Out Of Zion

Midnite & I Grade collaboration

- 2001 - Nemozian Rasta
- 2002 - Assini
- 2003 - Vijan
- 2005 - Let Live
- 2006 - Jah Grid
- 2007 - Rule The Time
- 2011 - Kings Bell
- 2014 - Beauty For Ashes
- 2014 - Ride Tru

Midnite & Branch I collaboration

- 2003 - Cipheraw
- 2003 - Geoman
- 2003 - He Is Jah
- 2004 - Project III

Midnite & Mystic Vision collaboration

- 2006 - Current
- 2006 - New 1000

Midnite & Ras L collaboration

- 2004 - Full Cup
- 2006 - Thru & True

Midnite & Groundbreaking collaboration

- 2007 - Aneed

Midnite & Lion Tribe/Fifthson collaboration

- 2007 - Suns Of Atom
- 2008 - Standing Ground
- 2010 - Momentum
- 2011 - Standing Ground Dub
- 2012 - In Awe
- 2013 - Be Strong

Midnite & Desmond Williams collaboration

- 2008 - Kayamagan

Midnite & Rastar collaboration

- 2007 - Better World Rasta
- 2008 - Supplication To H.I.M.
- 2009 - To Mene
- 2009 - Ina Now
- 2011 - Treasure
- 2011 - The Way
- 2012 - Children Of Jah
- 2013 - Children Of Jah Dubs
- 2014 - Better World Rasta Live Dubs

Midnite & Higher Bound Prod collaboration

- 2007 - Bless Go Roun
- 2010 - Ark A Law (Lion I)
- 2013 - Free Indeed,

Midnite & Iaahden Sounds collaboration

- 2014 - Stand The Test

Midnite & Lustre Kings collaboration

- 2007 - Infinite Quality
- 2008 - Infinite Dub

Midnite & Natural Vibes collaboration

- 2008 - Maschaana

Midnite & Youssoupha Sidibe collaboration

- 2008 - For All

Midnite & Various artists collaboration

- 2002 - Weep Not
- 2008 - New Name
- 2008 - Gather The Remnant
- 2009 - Defender Of The Faith
- 2009 - Kings Of Kush
- 2009 - Frontline Souljah
