= Caribbean English =

English dialects native to the Caribbean

Coordinates: 15.187°N 75.175°W

- Region: Commonwealth Caribbean
- Native speakers: (1,824,960 cited 2001‑21) (Note: Including only seventeen countries and territories listed in Allsopp 2003, pp. xii–xvi, ie Anguilla, Antigua and Barbuda, Bahamas, Barbados, Belize, Bermuda, Cayman Islands, Dominica, Grenada, Guyana, Jamaica, Montserrat, Netherlands Antilles, St Kitts and Nevis, St Lucia, St Vincent and the Grenadines, Suriname, Trinidad and Tobago, Turks and Caicos, British and US Virgin Islands.); L2: 540,200 (2003‑20) (Note: Including only seventeen countries and territories listed in Allsopp 2003, pp. xii–xvi, ie Anguilla, Antigua and Barbuda, Bahamas, Barbados, Belize, Bermuda, Cayman Islands, Dominica, Grenada, Guyana, Jamaica, Montserrat, Netherlands Antilles, St Kitts and Nevis, St Lucia, St Vincent and the Grenadines, Suriname, Trinidad and Tobago, Turks and Caicos, British and US Virgin Islands. L2 data missing for some countries or territories in Eberhard, Simons & Fennig 2022, digest on English.)
- Language family: Indo-European: Germanic; West Germanic; North Sea Germanic; Anglo-Frisian; Anglic; English; Caribbean English
- Early forms: Proto-Indo-European: Proto-Germanic; Old English; Middle English; 17th century Modern English
- Standard forms: Caribbean Standard English
- Dialects: Antiguan and Barbudan English; Bahamian English; Barbadian English; Bay Islands English; Bermudian English; Belizean English; Bocas del Toro Creole; Cayman Islands English; Grenadian Creole English; Gustavia English; Guyanese Creole; Jamaican English; - Jamaican Patois; Limonese Creole; Miskito Coast Creole; Montserrat Creole; Puerto Rican English; Rama Cay Creole; San Andrés–Providencia Creole; San Nicolaas English; Trinidadian and Tobagonian English; - Trinidadian Creole; - Tobagonian Creole; Turks and Caicos Creole; Vincentian Creole; Virgin Islands Creole
- Writing system: Latin (English alphabet)

Official status
- Official language in: Commonwealth Caribbean
- Recognised minority language in: Samana English (Dominican Republic)

Language codes
- ISO 639-3: –
- IETF: en-029

Caribbean English (CE, (Note: The CE abbreviation is used in Allsopp 2003, p. lxx. Others may use it for Canadian English.) CarE) is a set of dialects of the English language which are spoken in the Caribbean and most countries on the Caribbean coasts of Central America and South America. Caribbean English is influenced by, but is distinct to the English-based creole languages spoken in the region. Though dialects of Caribbean English vary structurally and phonetically across the region, all are primarily derived from British English, Indigenous languages and West African languages. In some countries with a plurality Indian population, such as Trinidad and Tobago and Guyana, Caribbean English has further been influenced by Hindustani and other South Asian languages. Some countries in or bordering Latin America are influenced by Spanish.

== Overview ==
- The daily-used English in the Caribbean has a different set of pronouns, typically me, meh or mi, you, yuh, he, she, it, we, wi or alawe, wunna or unu, and dem or day. Central Americans use I, mi, my, he, she, ih, it, we, wi or alawe, allayu or unu, and dem, den, deh.
- Consonant changes like h-dropping or th-stopping are common.
- Some might be "sing-songish" like in Trinidad and the Bahamas. The "sing-songish sound is a result of the accents rich and vibrant tonality. Most notably the accents of Trinidad and Tobago known for having a fast pace, colorful, tonal, and vibrant accent, changing pitches according much like when one is singing.
- Rhotic: Bajan (Barbadian), Guyanese
- Influenced by Irish English: Jamaican, Bajan
- Influenced by any of the above, as well as Spanish and indigenous languages: Central American English dialects like the Belizean Creole (Kriol), or the Mískito Coastal Creole and Rama Cay Creole spoken in Nicaragua

However, the English that is used in the media, education, and business and in formal or semi-formal discourse approaches the internationally understood variety of Standard English (British English in all former and present British territories and American English in Puerto Rico and the US Virgin Islands) but with an Afro-Caribbean cadence (Spanish cadence in Puerto Rico and the Archipelago of San Andrés, Providencia and Santa Catalina).

== Dialects ==
The first-order dialects deemed constituent of Caribbean English vary within scholarly literature. For instance, the Oxford English Dictionary includes only 'the forms of English as spoken in Jamaica, Trinidad & Tobago, Guyana, Belize, the Bahamas and Barbados, as well as in some of the smaller Eastern Caribbean nations' in deriving its phonetic transcriptions. The Dictionary of Caribbean English Usage further includes the dialects of Bermuda, the Cayman Islands, the Virgin Islands, the Netherlands Antilles, Suriname, and the Turks and Caicos.

Caribbean English-based creole languages are commonly (in popular literature) or sometimes (in scholarly literature) considered dialects of Caribbean English. (Note: For instance, the first sentence in Robinson 2007 describes the ensuing content as including information 'about the history of English in the Caribbean,' but then goes on to only cover the history of English-based creole languages. Further, Allsopp 2003, pp. xxvi–xxvii include creole entries in their dictionary, noting the frequent inclusion of creole words, phrases, and dialogue in English literature of the region, and further stating that 'creole dialects are a pan-Caribbean reality which no professional lexicography, whatever be its mandate, can simply ignore.' Additionally, OED 2022, model for CarE included aspects of various creoles in its production of a pronunciation key and model for Caribbean English.)

== History ==
The development of Caribbean English is dated to the West Indian exploits of Elizabethan Sea Dogs, which are credited with introducing to England names for new-found flora and fauna via, for instance, Hakluyt's Principall Navigations of 1589 and Raleigh's Discoverie of the Empyre of Guiana of 1596. As English settlements followed shortly thereafter, Caribbean English has been deemed 'the oldest exportation of that language from its British homeland.'

Two sorts of anglophone immigrants to the seventeenth-century West Indies have been described in literature – the first, consisting of indentured servants and settlers mainly from southwestern England, predominantly speaking non-standard vernaculars of English; the second, consisting of colonial administrators, missionaries, and educators, predominantly speaking more standard forms of the language. The former, along with African slaves, are credited with the development and spread of [non-standard-] English-derived creole languages, while the latter are noted as frequent sources of derision of such speech.

== Features ==
Caribbean English accents and pronunciation are variable within and across sub-dialects. For instance, Barbadian English is fully rhotic, while Jamaican English is not. Further, within Jamaican English, h-dropping is common in some social classes, but uncommon in others. Additionally, in territories with English-derived creole languages, the phonetic distinction between English and creole is thought to be continuous rather than discrete, with the creole acrolect differing 'only trivially' from English. (Note: The OED 2022, model for CarE recently noted – Of all [sixteen] World English varieties currently addressed by the OED, delineating a ‘Caribbean English’ provides the greatest challenge [as t]here is vast phonetic and phonological diversity across this region[.])

Nevertheless, there is thought to be 'a general sense in which a "West Indian accent" is distinguishable as such anywhere in the world.' Likely reasons for this have been described as 'the general quality of CE [Caribbean English] vowels, the sharp reduction in the number of diphthongal glides and, the most distinguishing feature of all, the phrasal intonation [and] separation of syllabic pitch and stress in CE.' Broadly, the middle-register of Caribbean English is thought to contain eight fewer phonemes than Received Pronunciation. (Note: That is, ten, four, and twenty-one vowels, glides, and consonants, respectively, compared to eleven, eight, and twenty-four in Received Pronunciation as represented in Gimson 1980 (Allsopp 2003, p. xlvi).)

The lexicon of Caribbean English varies, to an extent, across and within sub-dialects. '[T]he bulk of the vocabulary,' however, has been described as 'identical' across the region. Additionally, in territories with English-derived creole languages, the lexical distinction between English and creole is thought to be continuous rather than discrete, such that 'structurally it is impossible to draw exact lines between them.'

=== Tables ===
Sample of phonetic features distinctive of lower-to-upper-register Caribbean English as used in at least some territories.
Feature	Gloss	Notes
th-stopping	/θ/ pronounced as /t/ (e.g. /tiŋk/ (think) or /tri/ (three)); /ð/ pronounced as /d/ (e.g. in /dɪs/ (this) or /dæt/ (that))	varies by class; cf
h-dropping	Initial /h/ deleted (e.g. /æpi/ (happy) or /aʊs/ (house))	varies by class; may vary within CarE; cf
consonant cluster reduction	Consonant clusters are simplified, namely in the coda (e.g. /bɛst/ > /bɛs/ (best), /ɹɪ.spɛkt/ > /ɹɪ.spɛk/ (respect), or /lænd/ > /læn/ (land))	varies by class; cf
rhoticity	<Vr> is pronounced using /ɹ/ (e.g. /ɑɹd/ (hard) or /kɔɹn/ (corn))	varies within CarE; cf
unreduced vowel in weak syllables	vowels in unstressed syllables not reduced e.g. /a/ in about or bacon, or e.g. /of/ in lot of work or /a/ in in a few days	may vary by class; cf
FACE vowel	idiosyncratic phoneme e.g. in game, tray, plain, great	varies by class; cf
GOAT vowel	idiosyncratic phoneme e.g. in home, show, boat, toe	varies by class; cf
L consonant	idiosyncratic /l/ phoneme e.g. in milk	cf
W consonant	idiosyncratic /w/ phoneme e.g. in week or wet	cf
glide cluster reduction	/h/ in /wh/ not pronounced e.g. in whine	may vary by class; cf
stress shift	idiosyncratic prosody of words e.g. in rea-LISE, ce-le-BRATE, a-gri-CUL-ture	cf
fronting	idiosyncratic prosody of phrases e.g. in is BORROW she borrow it	cf

Sample of grammatical features distinctive of lower-to-upper-register Caribbean English as used in at least some territories.
Feature	Gloss	Notes
zero indefinite article	indefinite articles [occasionally] omitted e.g. in in _ couple of days	cf
zero past tense marker	verbs left unmarked for tense e.g. in I work_ a few months	cf
zero plural marker	nouns left unmarked for plurality e.g. in my relative_ were	cf
functional shift	part-of-speech and sense of words shifted e.g. noun to verb shift of rice in to rice somebody	cf
zero subject–verb inversion	subject-verb order not inverted in questions e.g. in You going back?	cf
reduplication	emphatic repetition of words or phrases e.g. in fool-fool, big big big	cf

Lexical sets of upper-register Caribbean English as used in select territories. (Note: Note BrE, AmE stand for British English, American English. Phonemes with CarE–BrE or CarE–AmE differences are recorded in red. In columns BrE, AmE, en dashes (–) stand for phoneme is the same as that in CarE. In the Notes column, en dashes represent missing or null values. CarE dialects sampled for these data were those of the Bahamas, Guyana, Jamaica (OED 2022, model for CarE). Additionally, English creoles of Barbados, Jamaica, and Trinidad and Tobago were sampled (OED 2022, model for CarE). CarE dialects or English creoles of Barbados, Belize, and the Lesser Antilles may have been, to a lesser extent, sampled (OED 2022, model for CarE).)
Set	CarE	BrE	AmE	Notes
kit	⟨ɪ⟩	–	–	–
dress	⟨ɛ⟩	–	–	–
trap	⟨a⟩	–	–	–
bath	⟨aː⟩	⟨ɑː⟩ + ⟨a⟩	⟨æ⟩	–
lot	⟨ɑ⟩	⟨ɒ⟩	–	–
cloth	⟨ɔː⟩	⟨ɒ⟩	⟨ɔ⟩ + ⟨ɑ⟩	–
strut	⟨ʌ⟩	–	⟨ə⟩	–
foot	⟨ʊ⟩	–	–	–
fleece	⟨iː⟩	–	⟨i⟩	–
goose	⟨uː⟩	–	⟨u⟩	–
palm	⟨aː⟩	⟨ɑː⟩	⟨ɑ⟩	–
start	⟨aː⟩ / ⟨aːr⟩	⟨ɑː⟩	⟨ɑr⟩	–
nurse	⟨ɜː⟩ / ⟨ɜːr⟩	⟨əː⟩	⟨ər⟩	–
north	⟨oː⟩ / ⟨oːr⟩	⟨ɔː⟩	⟨ɔr⟩	–
force	⟨oː⟩ / ⟨oːr⟩	⟨ɔː⟩	⟨ɔr⟩	–
thought	⟨ɔː⟩ + ⟨aː⟩	⟨ɔː⟩	⟨ɔ⟩ + ⟨ɑ⟩	–
near	⟨eː⟩ / ⟨eː r⟩	⟨ɪə⟩	⟨ɪr⟩ / ⟨ɪər⟩	–
square	⟨eː⟩ / ⟨eː r⟩	⟨ɛː⟩	⟨ɛr⟩ / ⟨ɛər⟩	–
cure	⟨oː⟩ / ⟨oːr⟩	⟨ʊə⟩ + ⟨ɔː⟩	⟨ʊr⟩ / ⟨ʊər⟩	–
face	⟨eː⟩	⟨eɪ⟩	⟨eɪ⟩	–
pride	⟨ai⟩	⟨ʌɪ⟩	⟨aɪ⟩	–
voice	⟨ɔi⟩ + ⟨ai⟩	⟨ɔɪ⟩	⟨ɔɪ⟩	–
mouth	⟨aʊ⟩ + ⟨ɔʊ⟩	⟨aʊ⟩	⟨aʊ⟩	–
goat	⟨oː⟩	⟨əʊ⟩	⟨oʊ⟩	–
happy	⟨i⟩	–	–	–
letter	⟨a⟩	⟨ə⟩	⟨ər⟩	–
rabbit	⟨ɪ⟩	⟨ᵻ⟩	–	–
added	⟨ɪ⟩	⟨ᵻ⟩	⟨ə⟩	–
beautiful	⟨ʊ⟩	–	⟨ə⟩	–
piano	⟨i⟩	⟨ɪ⟩	–	–
ago	⟨a⟩	⟨ə⟩	⟨ə⟩	–
because	⟨i⟩	⟨ᵻ⟩	⟨ə⟩ + ⟨i⟩	–

Consonant phonemes of upper-register Caribbean English as used in select territories. (Note: Note BrE, AmE stand for British English, American English. Phonemes with CarE–BrE or CarE–AmE differences are recorded in red. In columns CarE, BrE, AmE, multiplication signs (×) stand for phoneme is present while en dashes (–) stand for phoneme is absent. In the Notes column, en dashes represent missing or null values. CarE dialects sampled for these data were those of the Bahamas, Barbados, Belize, Guyana, Jamaica, Trinidad and Tobago, and some of the Lesser Antilles (OED 2022, key for CarE).)
Unit	CarE	BrE	AmE	Notes
⟨b⟩	×	×	×	–
⟨d⟩	×	×	×	–
⟨dʒ⟩	×	×	×	–
⟨ð⟩	–	×	×	–
⟨f⟩	×	×	×	–
⟨g⟩	×	×	×	–
⟨h⟩	×	×	×	–
⟨j⟩	×	×	×	–
⟨k⟩	×	×	×	–
⟨l⟩	×	×	×	–
⟨m⟩	×	×	×	–
⟨n⟩	×	×	×	–
⟨ŋ⟩	×	×	×	–
⟨p⟩	×	×	×	–
⟨r⟩	×	×	×	–
⟨s⟩	×	×	×	–
⟨ʃ⟩	×	×	×	–
⟨t⟩	×	×	×	–
⟨tʃ⟩	×	×	×	–
⟨θ⟩	–	×	×	–
⟨v⟩	×	×	×	–
⟨w⟩	×	×	×	–
⟨z⟩	×	×	×	–
⟨ʒ⟩	×	×	×	–
⟨x⟩	–	×	×	–
⟨ɬ⟩	–	×	–	–

== Standardisation ==
The standardisation of Caribbean English is thought to have begun upon the advent of government-funded public education in the West Indies in 1833. Notably, the earliest public teachers, credited with first developing Standard Caribbean English, had been 'imported direct from Britain, or recruited from among the "coloured" class on the islands who had benefited from their mixed parentage by receiving the rudiments of education.' Linguistically, however, the growth of public education in said standard register resulted in 'a practical bilingualism' that has been described as a typical example of diglossia. By the late twentieth century, as most territories transitioned to sovereignty and adopted English as their official language, 'efforts were made to define norms for Caribbean English usage in public, formal domains, and more specifically examination settings.' These are thought to have culminated in the 1996 publication of the Dictionary of Caribbean English Usage, commonly deemed the authority on Standard Caribbean English, with the former defining the latter as 'the total body of regional lexicon and usage bound to a common core of syntax and morphology shared with [non-Caribbean forms of standardised English], but aurally distinguished as a discrete type by certain phonological features.' (Note: Though Allsopp 2003, p. lv first glosses Caribbean Standard English as the 'conglomerate of [the] several Standard Englishes [of] the nations and states of the former British West Indian colonies.')

== Study ==
The earliest scholarly dictionary of Caribbean English is thought to have been the 1967 Dictionary of Jamaican English. During Easter of that same year, the Caribbean Association of Headmasters and Headmistresses resolved –

Be it resolved that this Association request the appropriate department of the University of the West Indies to compile a list of lexical items in each territory and to circulate these to schools for the guidance of teachers.

— Resolution 6 of the CAHH Conference of Easter 1967.

Said resolution was promptly forwarded to Richard Allsopp, who by mid-1967 'already had some ten shoe-boxes each of about 1,000 6 × 4 cards and many loose unfiled cuttings, notes and other material [from Guyana, the Lesser Antilles, Belize, Jamaica, and Trinidad].' In 1971, Allsopp introduced the Caribbean Lexicography Project as 'a survey of [English] usage in the intermediate and upper ranges of the West Indian speech continuum.' This set the stage for the seminal Dictionary of Caribbean English Usage, first published 1996. (Note: Allsopp 2003, p. xxxi likens the publication to that of Webster's in 1828, the Dictionary of Canadian English in 1967, and the Australian National Dictionary in 1988.)

== Samples ==
Standard English: 'Where is that boy?' /hwɛər ɪz ðæt bɔɪ/

- Barbados: 'Wherr dah boi?' [hwer ɪz dæt bɔɪ] (spoken very quickly, rhotic with glottal stops).
- San Andrés and Providencia: 'Weh dah boi deh?' [hwe dæt bɔɪ deh]
- Jamaica: 'Weh dah bwoy deh?' [weh da bwoj de] (sporadic rhoticity from Irish and Scottish influence); or 'Wey iz dat boi?' [weɪ ɪz dæt bɔɪ] (non-rhotic and similar to the accents of southwestern England and Wales).
- Belize: 'Weh iz dat bwoy deh?' [weh ɪz dɑt bɔɪ deɪ] (British and North American influence but deeper in tone).
- Trinidad: 'Wey dat boy deh?' [weɪ dæt bɔɪ de]
- Bahamas: 'Wey dat boy iz?' [weɪ dæt bɔɪ ɪz] (some would more likely say "bey" [beɪ] instead of "boy").
- Guyana and Tobago: 'Weyr iz daht boy/bai?' [weɪɹ ɪz dɑt boɪ/baɪ] often in urban regions, or 'Wey dat boy dey?' [weɪɹ dæt bɔɪ deɪ] in rural regions (many variations depending on region or descent of speaker, and competency in standard English; sporadic rhoticity).
- Saint Vincent and the Grenadines: 'Wey dah boy deh deh?' [weɪ dɑ bɔɪ deɪ deɪ] (non-rhotic).
- Belize, Bluefields, Pearl Lagoon, Corn Islands, Bay Islands Department, Limón, Bocas del Toro Province, Puerto Rico, Cayman Islands and the Virgin Islands: 'Wehr iz daht booy?' [weɹ ɪz dɑt buɪ] (distinct, sporadic rhoticity, pronunciation becomes quite different from Creole pronunciation).
- Dominica: 'Weh dat boy (be) nuh?' [we dæt bɔɪ (bi) nʌ] (spoken harshly and with a deep tone).

The written form of the English language in the former and current British-controlled Caribbean countries conforms to the spelling and the grammar styles of Britain and in Puerto Rico and US Virgin Islands conforms to the spelling and the grammar styles of United States.

== See also ==
- Anguillan Creole
- Antiguan and Barbudan Creole
- Antiguan and Barbudan English
- Bajan Creole
- Bajan English
- Bahamian Creole
- Bahamian English
- Bay Islands English
- Belizean Creole
- Belizean English
- Bermudian English
- Bocas del Toro Creole
- Cayman Islands English
- English-based creole languages
- Grenadian Creole English
- Guyanese Creole
- Jamaican English
- Jamaican Patois
- Limonese Creole
- Miskito Coast Creole
- Montserrat Creole
- Puerto Rican English
- Rama Cay Creole
- Regional accents of English speakers
- Saban English
- Saint Kitts Creole
- Samaná English
- San Andrés–Providencia Creole
- Tobagonian Creole
- Turks and Caicos Creole
- Trinidadian Creole
- Trinidadian and Tobagonian English
- Vincentian Creole
- Virgin Islands Creole
- American and British English spelling differences
- Commonwealth English

== Notes and references ==
=== Full citations ===
1. "The Languages spoken in Guyana". StudyCountry.com. Madrid: StudyCountry. Archived from the original on 19 March 2022.
2. "Pronunciations for World Englishes". OED Online. Oxford: Oxford University Press.
3. Allsopp, Jeannette (2022). "Report on the Dictionary of Caribbean English Usage: School Edition". Dictionaries: Journal of the Dictionary Society of North America. 43 (1): 215–227. doi:10.1353/dic.2022.0011. S2CID 252203375.
4. Allsopp, Jeannette; Furiassi, Cristiano (2020). "Caribbean English Phraseology in the Dictionary of Caribbean English Usage: Reflections of an African Worldview". TEXTUS: English Studies in Italy. XXXIII (1): 107–125. hdl:2318/1742260.
5. Allsopp, Jeannette; Siegel, Jason F. (November 2016). "The work of the Caribbean Lexicographic Center: Past, present and future". 40 (suppl. 1): 15–22. doi:10.15517/rk.v40i3.28590. S2CID 164845876.
6. Allsopp, Richard, ed. (2003). Dictionary of Caribbean English Usage. Kingston: University of the West Indies Press. ISBN 9789766401450. ProQuest 2352573179.
7. Allsopp, Richard, ed. (2010). New register of Caribbean English usage. Kingston: University of the West Indies Press. ISBN 9789766402280. OCLC 535494345.
8. Ammon, Ulrich; Dittmar, Norbert; Mattheier, Klaus J.; Trudgill, Peter, eds. (2006). Sociolinguistics : An International Handbook of the Science of Language and Society. Handbooks of Linguistics and Communication Sciences; 3.3. Vol. 3 (2nd completely revised and extended ed.). Berlin; New York: Walter de Gruyter. doi:10.1515/9783110184181.3. ISBN 9783110199871. OCLC 174262379.
9. Blench, Roger (15 March 2013). A Dictionary of Belize English. Draft circulated for comment. Archived from the original on 29 January 2022.
10. Brunn, Stanley D.; Kehrein, Roland, eds. (2020). Handbook of the Changing World Language Map. Cham: Springer. doi:10.1007/978-3-030-02438-3. ISBN 9783030024383.
11. Burchfield, Robert, ed. (1994). English in Britain and Overseas: Origins and Development. The Cambridge History of the English Language. Vol. 5. Cambridge: Cambridge University Press. doi:10.1017/CHOL9780521264785. ISBN 9781139055543.
12. Collins, Peter, ed. (2015). Grammatical change in English world-wide. Studies in Corpus Linguistics; v. 67. Vol. 67. Amsterdam; Philadelphia: John Benjamins Publishing Co. doi:10.1075/scl.67. ISBN 9789027268907.
13. Deuber, Dagmar; Hackert, Stephanie; Hänsel, Eva Canan; Laube, Alexander; Hejrani, Mahyar; Laliberté, Catherine (1 August 2022). "The Norm Orientation of English in the Caribbean: A Study of Newspaper Writing from Ten Countries". American Speech. 97 (3): 265–310. doi:10.1215/00031283-8791736. S2CID 233704226.
14. Eberhard, David M.; Simons, Gary F.; Fennig, Charles D., eds. (2022). Ethnologue : Languages of the World (25th ed.). Dallas, TX: SIL International.
15. Freed, Kenneth (11 May 1993). "Caribbeanspeak : The area's languages range from Creole to Patois, from English to French". Los Angeles Times.
16. Gimson, A. C. (1980). An introduction to the pronunciation of English (3rd ed.). London: Edward Arnold. ISBN 9780713162882. OCLC 7003606.
17. Gorlach, Manfred; Holm, John A., eds. (1986). Focus on the Caribbean. Varieties of English around the world; General series; v. 8. Berlin; New York: John Benjamins Publishing Co. ISBN 9027248664. OCLC 14588593.
18. Hänsel, Eva Canan; Deuber, Dagmar (2019). "The interplay of the national, regional, and global in standards of English". English World-Wide. 40 (3): 241–268. doi:10.1075/eww.00031.han. S2CID 204392797.
19. Holbrook, David J.; Holbrook, Holly A. (November 2001). Guyanese Creole Survey Report (PDF) (Report). SIL International. Archived from the original (PDF) on 9 July 2018.
20. Holm, John, ed. (1983). Central American English. Varieties of English around the world : Text ser.; 2. Heidelberg: Julius Groos. ISBN 3872762958. OCLC 9818255.
21. Kozlova, Tetyana; Bespala, Liliia; Klymenko, Olga (5 December 2021). "Lexical Variation in Caribbean English: Allonymy from Cognitive-Onomasiological and Ecolinguistic Perspectives". Linguistics and Culture Review. 6 (S2): 82–101. doi:10.21744/lingcure.v6nS2.1941. S2CID 244950515.
22. Mahabir, Kumar (1999). "The Impact of Hindi on Trinidad English". Caribbean Quarterly. 45 (4): 13–34. doi:10.1080/00086495.1999.11671866. JSTOR 40654099.
23. McArthur, Tim; Lam-McArthur, Jacqueline; Fontaine, Lisa, eds. (2018). The Oxford Companion to the English Language (2nd ed.). Oxford: Oxford University Press. doi:10.1093/acref/9780199661282.001.0001. ISBN 9780191744389.
24. Nero, Shondel J., ed. (2006). Dialects, Englishes, Creoles, and Education. ESL & Applied Linguistics Professional Series. Mahwah, NJ; London: Lawrence Erlbaum Associates. doi:10.4324/9780203928660. ISBN 9780203928660.
25. Ogilvie, Sarah, ed. (2020). The Cambridge companion to English dictionaries. Cambridge companions to literature. Cambridge: Cambridge University Press. doi:10.1017/9781108553780. ISBN 9781108553780. S2CID 243603808.
26. Robinson, Jonnie (1 April 2007). "Caribbean English". London: British Library. Archived from the original on 19 July 2022.
27. Rodríguez González, Félix, ed. (1996). Spanish loanwords in the English language : a tendency towards hegemony reversal. Topics in English Linguistics : 18. Berlin; New York: Mouton de Gruyter. ISBN 3110148455. OCLC 34029435.
28. Schneider, Britta (Spring 2017). "'It's Kriol they're speaking!' – Constructing Language Boundaries in Multilingual and Ethnically Complex Communities". Bulletin VALS-ASLA. No. spécial t. 1: 63–73. ISSN 1023-2044. oai:doc.rero.ch:20170502121737-NX.
29. Schneider, Britta (March 2021). "Creole prestige beyond modernism and methodological nationalism : Multiplex patterns, simultaneity and non-closure in the sociolinguistic economy of a Belizean village". Journal of Pidgin and Creole Languages. 36 (1): 12–45. doi:10.1075/jpcl.00068.sch. S2CID 230576173.
30. Schneider, Edgar W.; Kortmann, Bernd, eds. (2004). A Handbook of Varieties of English : A Multimedia Reference Tool. Berlin; New York: Mouton de Gruyter. ISBN 3110175320. OCLC 56880203.
31. Seoane, Elena; Suárez-Gómez, Cristina, eds. (2016). World Englishes : new theoretical and methodological considerations. New theoretical and methodological considerations; v. 57. Amsterdam; Philadelphia: John Benjamins Publishing Co. ISBN 9789027249173. OCLC 938357719.
32. Siegel, Jason F. (2019). "Creating Regional Norms : A Mission for Caribbean Lexicography". Dictionaries: Journal of the Dictionary Society of North America. 40 (2): 171–200. doi:10.1353/dic.2019.0019. S2CID 214287254.
33. Wells, John C., ed. (1982). Beyond the British Isles. Accents of English. Vol. 3. Berlin; New York: Cambridge University Press. ISBN 0521242258. OCLC 7578097.
