= Dictionary of Caribbean English Usage =

1996 dictionary by Richard Allsopp

- Cover of the first edition (Note: Shows Caribbean English vocabulary in red and green in the bottom.)
- Editor: Richard Allsopp
- Subject: Caribbean English
- Publisher: Oxford University Press
- Publication date: 1996
- Publication place: Oxford
- Media type: Print
- Pages: 777
- ISBN: 0198661525
- Dewey Decimal: 427.972903
- LC Class: PE3304 .D54 1996

The Dictionary of Caribbean English Usage (DCEU (Note: Also abbreviated DCE.)) is a dictionary of Caribbean English, including Caribbean English creoles, compiled by University of the West Indies lexicographer Richard Allsopp, and first published by Oxford University Press in 1996. It is noted as the first such to comprehensively cover the English dialects and English creoles of the Commonwealth Caribbean, which is to say of Anguilla, Antigua and Barbuda, The Bahamas, Barbados, Belize, Dominica, Grenada, Guyana, Jamaica, Montserrat, Saint Kitts and Nevis, Saint Lucia, Saint Vincent and the Grenadines, Trinidad and Tobago, Turks and Caicos, and the UK and US Virgin Islands. The DCEU is descriptive in some respects and prescriptive in others, and is not a historical dictionary. It contains over 20,000 entries of lexical items in current usage, along with descriptive definitions and prescriptive register labels for each. For creoles though, the dictionary omits most basilectal words or phrases, such that their coverage is restricted to mesolectal and acrolectal vocabulary. The said prescriptivism and ommissions have been criticised in scholarly literature.

Allsopp began work for the DCEU in 1971, upon founding the Caribbean Lexicography Project in the Barbadian campus of their home institution. The dictionary was first published locally by the University of the West Indies Press in Kingston, Jamaica in 2003.

== Background ==
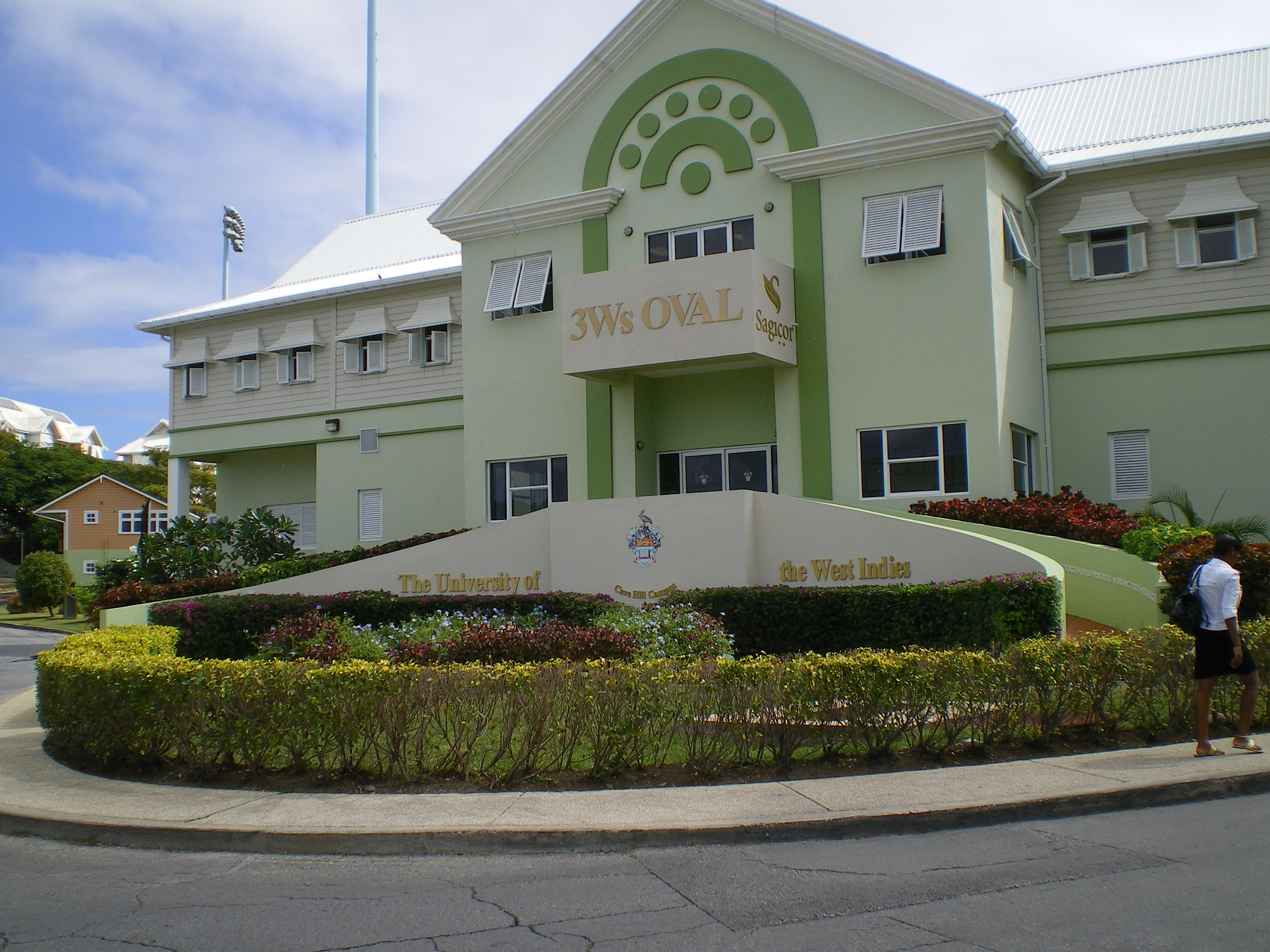
The DCEU was put together by the Caribbean Lexicography Project, under Richard Allsopp, in the 1970s to 1990s in UWI Cave Hill (their modern 3Ws Oval shown)

From at least 1905, Caribbean English and associated creoles "had from time to time prompted a few local glossaries", according to University of the West Indies English lecturer and lexicographer Richard Allsopp. A proper English dictionary, however, was not available for the said English dialects until 1967, when the Dictionary of Jamaican English was first published. Allsopp considers it "the first scholarly regional dictionary" for the Commonwealth Caribbean, but notes that it was "naturally seen as limited to Jamaica although its linguistic scholarship is regional in reach and importance". That same year, the Caribbean Association of Headmasters and Headmistresses, recognising "the inadecuacy of imported British and American dictionaries", resolved to "request the appropriate department of the University of the West Indies to compile a list of lexical items in each territory and to circulate these to schools for the guidance of teachers". This petition was forwarded to Allsopp, who by that time "already had some ten shoe-boxes each of about 1,000 6 × 4 cards and many loose unfiled cuttings, notes and other material" on language usage in Guyanan, Eastern Caribbean, (Note: That is, English dialects of Eastern Caribbean countries or territories.) Belizean, Jamaican and Trinidadian English, collected since at least 1949. The lexicographer resolved to follow through on the request, and in order to build a dictionary from the said collection, secured Ford Foundation funding and established the Caribbean Lexicography Project in 1971 in the university's Cave Hill campus in Barbados. Research work to assemble the lexicon extended to 1982, while the subsequent organisation of bare lexical data into a structured, readable dictionary took a further ten years. The completed manuscript was submitted to Oxford University Press in 1992, where it underwent a number of revisions over the next three years. The DCEU was first published by the said press in early 1996, and first reprinted by the University of the West Indies Press in 2003.

== Contents ==
The DCEU is a descriptive, but not historical, dictionary, in that it is "not a chronicle of [the Caribbean's] linguistic past, but a careful account of what is current". Despite this, it is also a prescriptive dictionary, in that it "[omits] the mass of Caribbean basilectal vocabulary and idiom in favour of the mesolectal and acrolectal, and [uses] a hierarchy of formalness in status-labelling the entries throughout." Over 20,000 English and creole entries form the main body of the dictionary, though it further contains a French and Spanish supplement, and an introductory survey of Caribbean English.

== Reception ==
The DCEU was criticised for excluding some English dialects native to the Caribbean, like Bay Islands English (use in Oak Ridge, Roatan shown on right signpost and background dock house)

The linguistic prescriptivism of the DCEU has been criticised in scholarly literature. For instance, Language reviewer Michael Aceto regretted that it serves to "reinforce a notion that creoles are only suitable for joking, insulting, and cursing". Similarly, University of Saskatchewan linguist Edmund O. Bamiro added that adhering to it required excluding "many lexical items which form part of the vibrancy of the Caribbean English lexicon". Aceto and Bamiro further critiqued or disapproved of the dictionary's introductory survey, its inclusion of loanwords not yet anglicised, and its exclusion of English dialects which belong to the Caribbean but not to the Commonwealth Caribbean.

Nevertheless, Allsopp deemed the DCEU a "landmark" publication, and compared it to the likes of Webster's, the Dictionary of Canadian English and the Australian National Dictionary, each of which were among the first dictionaries ever published (in 1828, 1967 and 1988, in that order) for their respective dialects (American, Canadian and Australian English, in that order). Reviewers have largely concurred since then.

== See also ==
- Macquarie Dictionary – 1981 Australian equivalent
- List of English dictionaries

== Notes and references ==
=== References ===
1. Aceto M (1998). "Dictionary of Caribbean English Usage, Ed. by Richard Allsopp (Review)". Language. 74 (2): 412–413. doi:10.1353/lan.1998.0210.
2. Allsopp R (1997). "Cataloguing the Caribbean". English Today. 13 (3): 37–38. doi:10.1017/S0266078400009822.
3. Allsopp R, ed. (1996). Dictionary of Caribbean English Usage. Oxford: Oxford University Press. ISBN 0198661525. LCCN 97108598.
4. Allsopp R, ed. (2003) [First published 1996 by OUP]. Dictionary of Caribbean English Usage (Reprint of 1st ed.). Kingston, Jamaica: University of the West Indies Press. ISBN 976-640-145-4. LCCN 2010385367. ProQuest 2352573179.
5. Allsopp R, ed. (2004) [First published 1996 by OUP]. Dictionary of Caribbean English Usage (New ed.). Kingston, Jamaica: University of the West Indies Press. OL 22149803M.
6. Bamiro EO (1998). "Review: Dictionary of Caribbean English Usage". Links & Letters. 5: 266–269. ISSN 1133-7397. UAB 167229.
7. Cooper VO (1996). "Dictionary of Caribbean English Usage". Caribbean Quarterly. 42 (4): 76–77. JSTOR 23050394.
8. Gorlach M (1996). "Richard Allsopp, Dictionary of Caribbean English Usage". English World-Wide. 17 (2): 289–296. doi:10.1075/eww.17.2.13gor.
9. Mair C (1997). "Review: Dictionary of Caribbean English Usage". Arbeiten aus Anglistik und Amerikanistik. 22 (1): 141–143. JSTOR 43025530.
10. Salazar D (2021). "A Carnival of Words: Caribbean English in the OED September 2021 Update". OED World English Hub. Archived from the original on 19 September 2024.
11. Winer L (1998). "Review: Dictionary of Caribbean English Usage". New West Indian Guide / Nieuwe West-Indische Gids. 72 (1–2): 188–192. JSTOR 41849922.
