= Belizean Kriol =

Belizean Kriol can refer to:

- Belizean Kriol people
- Belizean Creole, the English-based creole language
