= Limonese Creole =

Jamaican Patois dialect of Costa Rica

Limonese
- Limón Creole English
- Mekatelyu
- Native to: Costa Rica
- Native speakers: (55,000 cited 1986)
- Language family: English-African creole: Guinea Coast Creole English; Caribbean Creole English; Jamaicanic; Limonese

Language codes
- ISO 639-3: –
- Glottolog: limo1249
- IETF: jam-CR

Limonese Creole (also called Limonese, Limón Creole English or Mekatelyu) is a dialect of Jamaican Patois (Jamaican Creole), an English-based creole language, spoken in Limón Province on the Caribbean Sea coast of Costa Rica. The number of native speakers is unknown, but 1986 estimates suggests that there are fewer than 60,000 native and second language speakers combined.

== Origin and related creoles ==
Limonese is very similar structurally and lexically to the Jamaican Creole spoken in Jamaica and Panama and to a lesser extent other English-based creoles of the region, such as Colón Creole, Mískito Coastal Creole, Belizean Kriol, and San Andrés and Providencia Creole; many of these are also somewhat mutually intelligible to Limonese and each other.

=== Names ===
The name Mekatelyu is a transliteration of the phrase "make I tell you", or in standard English "let me tell you".

In Costa Rica, one common way to refer to Limonese is by the term "patois", a word of French origin used to refer to provincial Gallo-Romance languages of France that were historically considered to be unsophisticated "broken French"; these include Provençal, Occitan and Norman among many others.

== History ==
Limonese developed from Jamaican Creole that was introduced to the Limón Province by Jamaican migrant workers who arrived to work on the construction of the Atlantic railway, the banana plantations and on the Pacific railway. During the Atlantic slave trade, British colonizers in Jamaica and elsewhere in the British West Indies delivered African slaves from various regions of Africa who did not speak a common language so various creoles developed to facilitate communication between them, largely influenced by slavers' English.

Early forms of Limonese had to adjust for context that they were being used in so two language registers developed, one mutually intelligible to and heavily influenced by English for formal contexts and a common vernacular used among Limonese speakers in informal contexts.

== Modern day status ==
Some linguists are undecided on the categorization of Limonese. According to some authors, Limonese should be treated as a separate language altogether while others contend that it is merely a part of a dialect continuum between English and Jamaican Patois.

Limonese is documented to have been and is being gradually decreolized.

== See also ==
- Bahamian Creole
- Bajan
- Bermudian English
- Jamaican English

== Bibliography ==
- Herzfeld, Anita. Tense and Aspect in Limon Creole. Kansas: The University of Kansas, 1978.
- Herzfeld, Anita (2002). Mekaytelyuw: La Lengua Criolla. Editorial de la Universidad de Costa Rica, 438 pp. ISBN 9977-67-711-5.
- Wolfe, Terry. An Exploratory Study of the Morphology and Syntax of the English of the Province of Limon, Costa Rica. San José: Universidad de Costa Rica, 1970.
- Wright M., Fernando. Limon Creole: A Syntactic Analysis. San José: Universidad de Costa Rica. 1974.
- Wright M., Fernando. "Problemas y Métodos para la Enseñanza como Segunda Lengua a los Habitantes del Mek-a-tél-yu en la Provincia de Limón". Revista de la Universidad de Costa Rica, March–Sept. 1982.
- Wright M., Fernando. Problems and Methods of Teaching English as a Second Language to Limon Creole Speakers. Lawrence: The University of Kansas, 1979.
