= Belizean Spanish =

Variety of Spanish language

- Español beliceño
- Pronunciation: [espaˈɲol βeliˈseɲo]
- Ethnicity: Hispanic and Latin American Belizeans
- Native speakers: 199,393 (2022)
- Language family: Indo-European: Italic; Latino-Faliscan; Romance; Western; Ibero-Romance; West Iberian; Castilian; Spanish; North American Spanish; Central American Spanish; Belizean Spanish
- Early forms: Old Latin: Classical Latin; Vulgar Latin; Old Spanish; Early Modern Spanish
- Writing system: Latin (Spanish alphabet)

Language codes
- ISO 639-3: –
- Glottolog: None
- IETF: es-BZ
- Percentage of people in each district who reported being able to speak Spanish in the 2022 census. 20–25% 25–30% 30–35% 35–40% 40–45% 45–50% 50–55% 55–60% 60–65% 65–70% 70–75% 75–80% 80–85% 85–90%

Belizean Spanish (Spanish: español beliceño) is the dialect of Spanish spoken in Belize. It shares similarities with Caribbean Spanish, Andalusian Spanish, and Canarian Spanish. However, Belizean people of Guatemalan, Honduran, Mexican (including Mexican Mennonites), Nicaraguan, Salvadoran (including Salvadoran Mennonites), and even Cuban descent may speak different dialects of Spanish, but since they grow up in Belize, they adopt the local accent.

While English is the only official language of Belize, Spanish is widely spoken in the country. In the 2022 census, 199,393 people reported being able to speak Spanish, accounting for 50.2% of the population, making it the second most spoken language in the country after English. However, while Spanish is spoken by the majority of people in the northern and western parts of the country, it is spoken by less than half of those in the eastern and southern districts (including Belize City, the country's largest city), where Belizean Creole, English and Mayan languages dominate.

== History ==
Spanish language came to Belize when the Treaty of Tordesillas was signed in 1494, claiming the entire western New World for Spain, including what is now Belize. Then in the mid-16th century Spanish conquistadors explored this territory, declaring it a Spanish colony incorporated into the Captaincy General of Guatemala on December 27, 1527, when it was founded. In the second half of that century it was integrated into the government of Yucatan in the Viceroyalty of New Spain.

However, few Spanish settled in the area because of the lack of the gold they'd come seeking and the strong resistance of the Maya people. The Spanish colonists living in Belize often fought against the Maya, who were affected by slavery and disease carried by the Spanish.

On 20 January 1783, shortly after the Treaty of Versailles, Britain and Spain signed a peace treaty in which Spain ceded to Britain a small part of Belize, about 1.482 km square located between the Hondo and Belize rivers. British settlers obtained a further concession. By the London Convention of 1786 Spain ceded Belize another 1.883 km square (reaching the Sibun River or Manate Laguna, south of the Belize River). The British banned teaching of Spanish in schools.

But after thousands of Maya people and mestizos were driven from the area of Bacalar during the Caste War (1847–1901), about 7000 Mexican mestizos immigrated during these years, the Kekchi emigrated from Verapaz, Guatemala, where their lands had been seized for coffee plantations and many of them enslaved in the 1870s–1880s, Mopan returned to Belize around 1886, fleeing enslavement and taxation in Petén, Mennonite Mexicans settled in the north and west of Belize after 1958 (Mexican Mennonites may have intermarried with native-born mestizos and Mexican mestizos), and thousands of undocumented migrants moved to the central and western parts of the country, including approximately 40,000 Salvadorans (including Salvadoran Mennonites), Guatemalans, Hondurans and Nicaraguans immigrated to Belize in this decade of strife in neighboring countries between 1980 and 1990, this, along with a high fertility rate, dramatically increased the number of Hispanics in Belize, causing concern over the rapid growth of the Spanish language in a country where the official language is English.

== Phonology ==
- As in most of the Americas and parts of Spain, there is no distinction of /s/ and /θ/, they are pronounced as [s].
- As in most American lowland varieties of Spanish and in southern Spain, /s/ at the end of a syllable or before a consonant is realized typically as a glottal [h].
- /x/ is realized as glottal [h], as in several American lowland varieties and in parts of Spain.
- There is no confusion between /l/ and /r/, unlike in Caribbean Spanish.
- As Belize is bordered by Mexico and was inhabited by Mayan and Nahuatl peoples, Belizean Spanish adopted the voiceless alveolar affricate [t͡s] and the cluster [tl] (originally /tɬ/) represented by the respective digraphs ⟨tz⟩ and ⟨tl⟩ in loanwords of Nahuatl origin, quetzal and tlapalería [t͡ɬapaleˈɾia] ('hardware store'). Even words of Greek and Latin origin with ⟨tl⟩, such as Atlántico and atleta, are pronounced with /tl/: [aˈtlantiko], [aˈtleta] (compare [aðˈlantiko], [aðˈleta] in Spain and other dialects in Hispanic America).
- Aside from [ɾ] and [r], syllable-final /r/ can be realized as [ɹ], an influence of British English: "verso" (verse) becomes [ˈbeɹso], aside from [ˈbeɾso] or [ˈberso], "invierno" (winter) becomes [imˈbjeɹno], aside from [imˈbjeɾno] or [imˈbjerno], and "parlamento" (parliament) becomes [paɹlaˈmento], aside from [paɾlaˈmento] or [parlaˈmento]. In word-final position, /r/ will usually be either a trill, a tap or an approximant, as in the phrase "amo[r ~ ɾ ~ ɹ] eterno" (eternal love).

== See also ==
- Hispanic and Latin Belizean
