= Belizean Creole =

English-based creole language

- Bileez Kriol, Kriol
- Native to: Belize
- Ethnicity: Belizean Creoles
- Native speakers: 180,792 (2022)
- Language family: English Creole: Atlantic; Western; Belizean Creole

Language codes
- ISO 639-3: bzj
- Glottolog: beli1260
- Linguasphere: 52-ABB-ad
- Percentage of people in each district who reported being able to speak Creole in the 2022 census. 15–20% 20–25% 25–30% 30–35% 35–40% 40–45% 45–50% 50–55% 55–60% 60–65%

(audio) A native speaker of Belizean Creole speaking about her ambition as a youth.

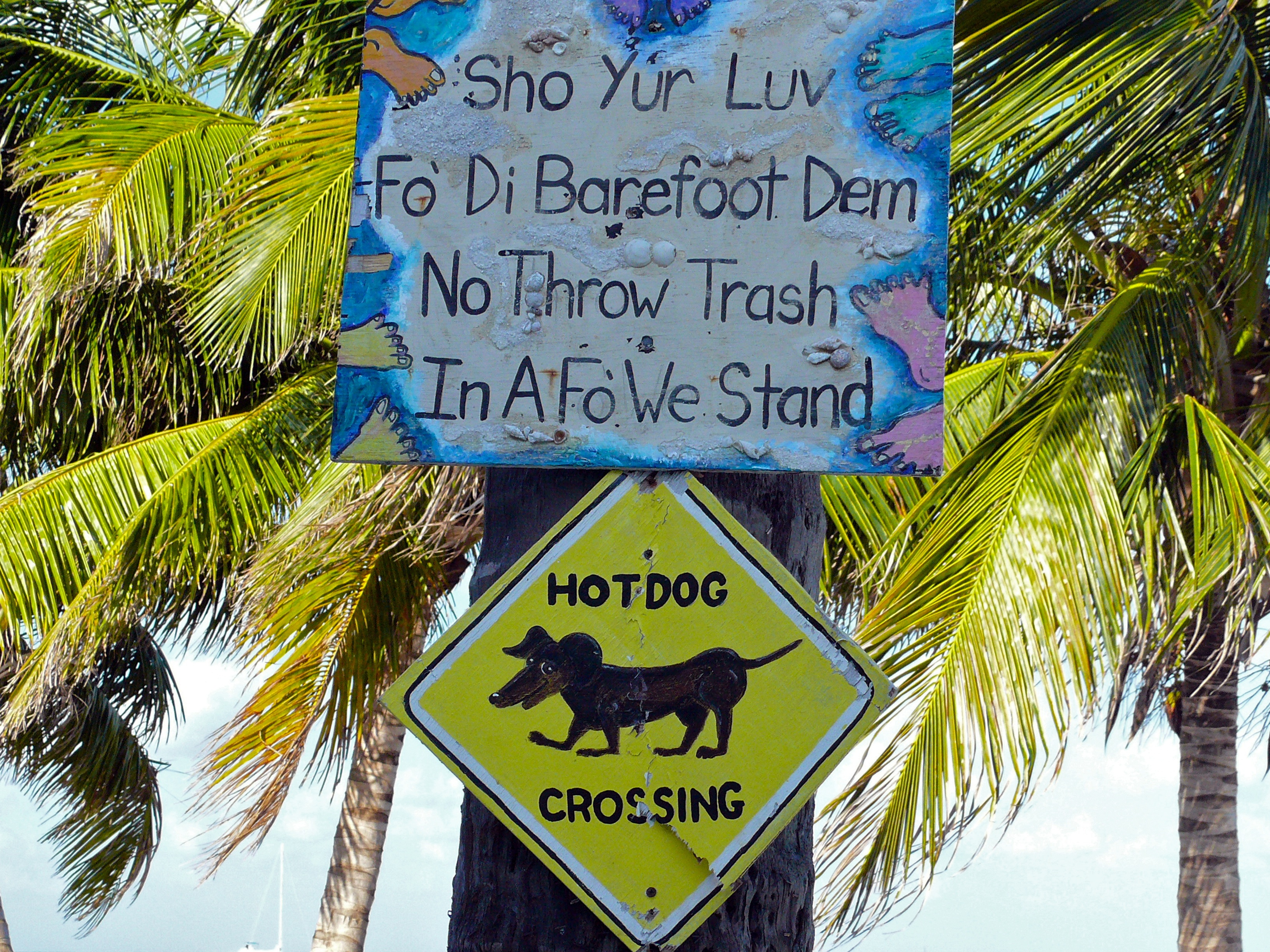
Sign in Belizean Creole above an English-language sign of a yellow diamond sign - watch out for animals - Dachshund, Caye Caulker

Belizean Creole (Bileez Kriol), also known by its endonym Kriol, is an English-based creole language spoken by the Belizean Creole people. It is closely related to Moskitian Creole, San Andrés-Providencia Creole, and Jamaican Patois.

Belizean Creole is a contact language that developed and grew between 1650 and 1930, initially as a result of the slave trade. Belizean Creole, like many Creole languages, first started as a pidgin. It was a way for people of other backgrounds and languages, in this case slaves and English colonisers within the logging industry, to communicate with each other. Over generations the language developed into a creole, being a language used as some people's mother tongue.

Belizean Creoles are people of Afro-European origin. While it is difficult to estimate the exact number of Belizean Creole speakers, it is estimated that there are more than 70,000 in Belize who speak the language. The 2010 Belizean census recorded that 25.9% of the people within Belize claimed Creole ethnicity and 44.6% claimed to speak Belizean Creole and put the number of speakers at over 130,000. In the 2022 census, 180,792 Belizeans reported being able to speak Creole, accounting for 45.5% of the population, making it the third most spoken language in Belize after English and Spanish. However, the vast majority of Creole speakers live in the districts of Belize and Stann Creek on the east coast. It is estimated that there are as many as 85,000 Creoles that have migrated to the United States and may or may not still speak the language.

Belizean Creole is the first language of some Garifunas, Mestizos, Maya, and other ethnic groups. When the National Kriol Council began standardising the orthography of the language, it decided to promote the spelling Kriol, though they continue to use the spelling Creole to refer to the people themselves.

== History ==
=== Origins ===
Belizean Creole was developed as a lingua franca for those who were forced to work within the logging industry, and the language itself is linked to many West African substrate languages. This is due to the fact that these slaves, more specifically identified as Belizean "Creoles", were taken from Jamaica and brought to what was then known as British Honduras, which was the name of Belize when it was a British crown colony, before gaining independence in September 1981.

The European Baymen first began to settle in the area of Belize City in the 1650s. Ken Decker proposed that the creole spoken in Belize previous to 1786 was probably more like Jamaican Patois than the Belize Kriol of today. By the Convention of London of 1786, the British were supposed to cease all logging operations along the Caribbean coast of Central America, except in the Belize settlement. Many of the settlers from the Miskito Coast moved to Belize, bringing their Miskito Coast Creole with them. The immigrants outnumbered the Baymen five to one. The local Kriol speech shifted to become something more like the Miskito Coast Creole.

=== Linguistic influences and development ===
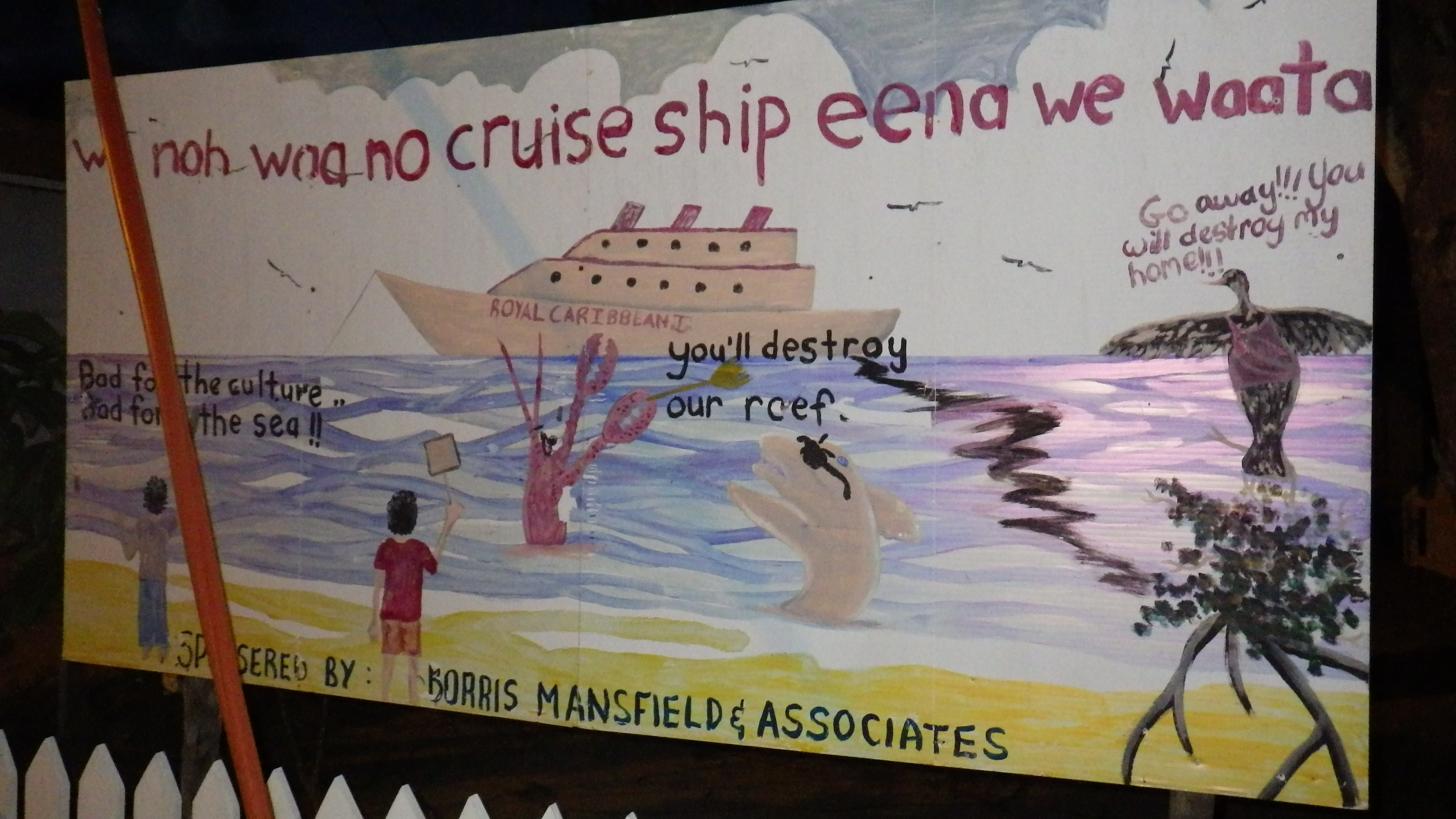
Anti-cruise ship poster with legend in Creole

Belize Kriol is derived mainly from English but is influenced by other languages brought into the country due to the slave trade. Its substrate languages are the Native American language Miskito, Spanish, and the various West African and Bantu languages that were brought into the country by slaves, which include Akan, Efik, Ewe, Fula, Ga, Hausa, Igbo, Kikongo, and Wolof.

There are numerous theories as to how creole languages form. The most common and linguistically supported hypothesis indicates that creoles start out as a pidgin languages when there exists a need for some type of verbal communication between members of communities who do not share the same language. In the case of Belize Kriol, the pidgin would have developed as a result of West Africans being captured and taken to the Americas as slaves to work in the logging industries, where they would be forced to communicate with slave owners of European descent. For the first generation of people speaking the pidgin language, the pidgin is not fully developed and the grammar of the language is not as systematic as fully fledged languages. When the people speaking the pidgin language begin having children who grow up having no entirely developed language, they will take the partial grammar of the pidgin language their parents speak and use it as a sort of blueprint with which they are able to assign a systematic grammatical structure to the language. It is at this point that the language becomes a fully fledged language, as it becomes a mother tongue for generations of speakers, and the result is a creole language. Belize Kriol specifically developed as a result of many West African slaves being subjected to English-speaking owners; and as a result, these people were forced to create a pidgin language using English as a substrate language which was then formed into a creole by their children.

=== Contemporary usage ===
English is still considered the main official language of Belize, as it carries much prestige, due to the fact it is a majority language. Road signs, official documents, and such are all written in English and the people of Belize are taught in English throughout their educational careers. Despite this, bilingualism and multilingualism is common within Belize; and many people of all ethnic backgrounds in Belize have adopted the minority language Kriol as their native language. Kriol is the lingua franca of Belize and is the first language of some Garifunas, Mestizos, Maya, and other ethnic groups. It is a second language for most others in the country.

Today, Belize Kriol is the first or second language of the majority of the country's inhabitants. Many of them speak standard English as well, and a rapid process of decreolization is taking place. As a result, a creole continuum exists and speakers are able to code-switch among various mesolect registers, between the most basilect to the acrolect varieties. The acrolect, much like the basilect, is rarely heard.

A 1987 travel guide in the Chicago Tribune newspaper reported that Belize Kriol is "a language that teases but just escapes the comprehension of a native speaker of English."

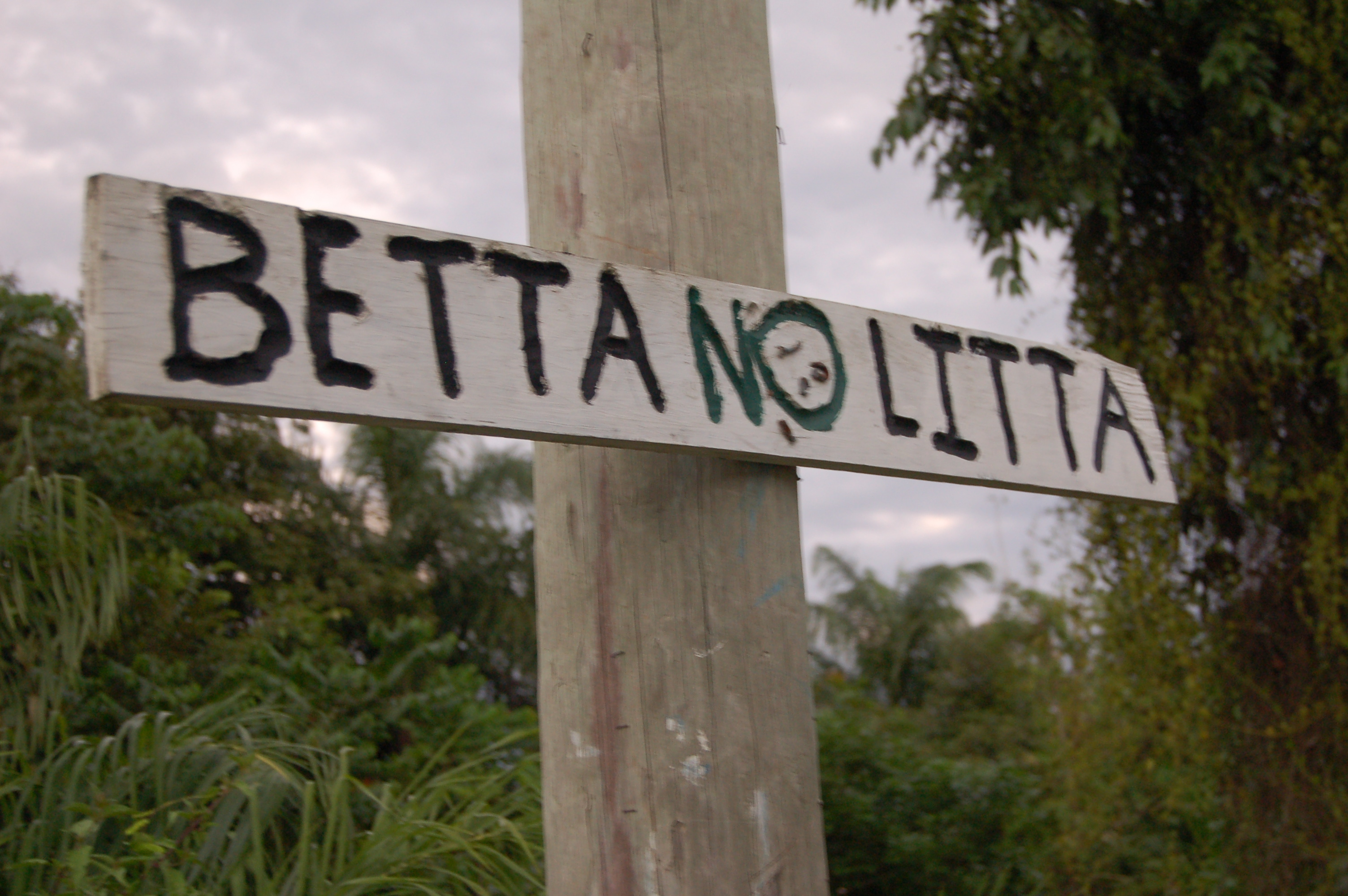
No-littering sign at Burrell Boom

There are multiple regional vernacular varieties of Belizean Kriol; so, depending on where one is, the vernacular may be slightly different. A locale in the south of Belize, such as Punta Gorda, may have a slightly different Kriol vernacular than that one of the more northern areas, such as Belize City, which shows a vernacular closer to traditional Kriol, because of this, has gained more prestige than other vernaculars that stray farther away from the traditional vernacular.

== Education and literature ==
English taught in the schools of Belize is based on British English, but it is often influenced by the teachers' Kriol speech. The 1999 Ministry of Education: School Effectiveness Report (p. 84) notes that "Creole is spoken as the first language in most homes." Belizean people speak English, Kriol, and often Spanish, while learning the English system of writing and reading in schools. It is a slightly different system of communication from the standard forms. In recent years there has been a movement to have Kriol used more within the Belizean education system and in government documentation. The Belize Kriol Project and the National Kriol Council of Belize are at the forefront of this movement, striving to bring more prestige and recognition to the language.

Current literary works using Kriol include an English and Kriol dictionary, and a translation of the Bible's New Testament. The dictionary brought attention to grammar, as well as the definition of common Kriol words, and the dictionary influenced the creation of a few other books that were solely based on Kriol grammar. There has also been a rise in poetry, fiction, and newspapers written in Kriol.

== Phonology ==
Kriol shares phonological similarities with many Caribbean English Creoles as well as with English, its superstrate language. Pidgin languages have a general tendency to simplify the phonology of a language in order to ensure successful communication. Many creoles keep this tendency after creolization. Kriol is no exception to this.

Kriol uses a high number of nasalized vowels, palatalizes non-labial stops, and prenasalizes voiced stops. Consonant clusters are reduced at the end of words and many syllables are reduced to only a consonant and vowel.

1. Like most creole languages, Kriol has a tendency to have an open syllabic structure, meaning there are many words ending in vowels. This feature is strengthened by its tendency to delete consonants at the end of words, especially when the preceding vowel is unstressed.
2. Nasalization is phonemic in Kriol, caused by the deletion of final nasal consonants. The nasal feature is kept, even if the consonant has been dropped.
3. Many Kriol speakers tend to palatalize the velar consonants /ɡ/ and /k/ preceding /ɑː/. Sometimes they also palatalize alveolar consonants, such as /t/, /d/, and /n/.
4. Like all other creole languages, Kriol has a tendency to reduce consonant clusters no matter where they occur. Final consonant clusters are almost always reduced by dropping the second consonant. Initial and medial occurrences are reduced much less consistently.
5. When /r/ occurs finally, it is always deleted. When it occurs in the middle of a word, it is often deleted leaving a residual vowel length.
6. Although its superstrate language, English, makes extensive use of dental fricatives (/θ/ /ð/), Belizean Kriol does not use them. It rather employs the alveolar stops /t/ and /d/. However, due to the ongoing process of decreolization, some speakers include such dental fricatives in their speech.
7. Unstressed initial vowels are often deleted in Kriol. Sometimes this can lead to a glottal stop instead.
8. Vowels tend to be alternated for the ones used in English, for instance /bwɑi/ or /bwoi/ (boy) becomes /boi/, /ɑnɡri/ (angry) becomes /ænɡri/, and so on.
9. Stress is evenly distributed across syllables, meaning that the prosody of Kriol is different than its lexifier. It is reserved mainly for content words and appears to only have High and Low tones.

=== Vowel chart ===
	Front	Central	Back
High long short	iː i		uː u
Mid long short	eː		oː o
Low long short		ɑː ɑ	
Diphthongs	ɑ^{i}		o^{u}

=== Consonant chart ===
	Labial	Alveolar	Post-alveolar	Palatal	Velar	Glottal
Nasal	m	n			ŋ	
Plosive	p b	t d			k ɡ	
Affricate			tʃ dʒ			
Fricative	f v	s z	ʃ ʒ			h
Trill		r				
Approximant	w		l	j		

Some of these sounds only appear as allophones of phonemes.

=== Consonants and vowels ===
Kriol uses three voiced plosives (/b/ /d/ /ɡ/) and three voiceless plosives (/p/ /t/ /k/). The voiceless stops can also be aspirated. However, aspiration is not a constant feature; therefore, the aspirated and non-aspirated forms are allophonic. The language employs three nasal consonants, (/m/ /n/ /ŋ/). It makes extensive use of fricatives, both unvoiced (/f/ /s/ /ʂ/) and voiced (/v/ /z/ /ʐ/. Its two liquids, /l/ and /r/, are articulated alveo-palatally. The tongue is more lax here than in American English; its position is more similar to that of British English. Kriol's glides /w/, /j/, and /h/ are used extensively. Glottal stops occur rarely and inconsistently. Kriol makes use of eleven vowels: nine monophthongs, three diphthongs, and schwa [ə]. The most frequently occurring diphthong, /ai/, is used in all regional varieties. Both /au/ and /oi/ can occur, but they are new additions and are viewed as a sign of decreolization. The same is perceived of four of the less productive monophthongs.

== Orthography ==
Unlike most creoles, Kriol has a standardized orthography.

Consonants: b, ch, d, f, g, h, j, k, l, m, n, p, r, s, sh, t, v, w, y, z, zh

Vowel	Orthography	Example	definition
/iː/	ee	teef	'thief'
/i/	i	ɡi(v)	'give'
/eː/ or /ʲe/	ay	bayk	'bake'
/e/	e	tek	'take'
/aː/	aa	gaan	'gone'
/a/	a	bak	'back [of body]'
/uː/	oo	shooz	'shoes'
/u/	u	shub	'shove'
/oː/	oa	boan	'bone'
/o/	o	don	'done'
/ai/	ai	bwai	'boy'
/ou/	ou	bout	'about'

== Morphology ==
=== Tense ===
The present tense verb is not marked overtly in Kriol. It also does not indicate number or person. As an unmarked verb, it can refer both to present and to perfective. The English past tense marker |d| at the end of the verbs indicates acrolectal speech. However, there is the possibility to mark the past by putting the tense marker |mi| before the verb. Overt marking is rare, however, if the sentence includes a semantic temporal marker, such as "yestudeh" (yesterday) or "laas season" (last season).

The future tense is indicated by employing the preverbal marker wa or a. Unlike the marking of past tense, this marking is not optional.

=== Aspect ===
==== The progressive aspect ====
The preverbal marker di expresses the progressive aspect in both past and present tense. However, if the past is not marked overtly (lexically or by using mi), an unambiguous understanding is only possible in context. di is always mandatory. In the past progressive, it is possible to achieve an unambiguous meaning by combining mi + di + verb.

Progressive action in the future can be expressed by using bi in conjunction with wɑ. The correct combination here would be wɑ + bi + verb.

==== The habitual aspect ====
Kriol does not have a habitual aspect in its own right. Other creoles have a general tendency to merge the habitual with the completive, the habitual with the progressive, or the habitual with the future. Kriol however, does not clearly merge it with anything. Thus, we can only assume that the habitual is expressed by context and not by morphological marking.

==== The completive aspect ====
The completive aspect is expressed either without marking — that is, by context only — or by the use of a completive preverbal marker, such as don or finiʂ.

=== Mood and voice ===
==== Conditional ====
The conditional mood is expressed through the conditional verbs wuda, mi-wa, and mia. The short version, da, is employed only in the present tense; the past tense requires the longer forms.

==== Passive voice ====
There is no overt lexical marking of active and passive in Kriol. It is only the emphasis of a sentence that can clarify the meaning, together with context. Emphasis can be strengthened by adding emphatic markers, or through repetition and redundancy.

=== Verb usage ===
==== Special verbs ====
There are four forms of "be" in Kriol: de, two uses of di, and the absence of a marker. The equative form di is used as a copula (when the complement of the verb is either a noun or a noun phrase). de is the locative form that is used when the verb's complement is a prepositional phrase. No overt marking is used when the complement is an adjective. di, finally, is used in the progressive aspect.

The verb "to go" is irregular in Kriol, especially when set in the future progressive. It does not use the progressive marker di, which is replaced by the morpheme and ɡwein. The past tense is expressed similarly: instead of employing mi, the lexical item ɡaan is used.

A verb that is used extensively in each conversation is mek. It can be used as a modal in casual requests, in threats and intentional statements, and, of course, like the standard verb "to make".

=== Noun usage ===
==== Plural formation ====
Plurals are usually formed in Kriol by inserting the obligatory postnomial marker de. Variations of this marker are den and dem. As decreolization progresses, the standard English plural ending -s occurs far more frequently. Sometimes, the de is added to this form: for instance, in "shoes de" – shoes.

The absence of an appropriate plural marker occurs rarely.

=== Loan words ===
Many Spanish, Maya, and Garifuna words refer to popular produce and food items:

panades
garnaches
salbutes
tamales
hudut
wangla
goma
reyeno
bundiga
comadre
compadre

== Syntax ==
=== Syntactic ordering ===
The construction of sentences in Kriol is very similar to that in English. It uses a Subject-Verb-Object order (SVO). All declarative and most interrogative sentences follow this pattern, the interrogatives with a changed emphasis. The construction of the phrases follows Standard English in many ways.

=== Locatives ===
Locatives are more frequently used in Kriol and much more productive than in Standard English. The general locative is expressed by the morpheme da ("at" or "to"). It is possible to use to or pɑn ("on") instead. This is an indication of either emphasis or decreolization. Another morpheme which is more specific than dɑ is inɑ ("into"). It is used in contexts where dɑ is not strong enough.

Together with the verb "look", however, dɑ is not used and considered as incorrect. To express "to look at", it is wrong to say "luk da". The correct version would be "luk pan".

=== Noun plus pronoun ===
In a noun phrase, Kriol can employ a structure of both noun and pronoun to create emphasis. The ordering then is noun + pronoun + verb (for instance, "mista filip hi noa di ansa" – Mr. Philip knows the answer).

=== Adjectives ===
Adjectives are employed predicatively and attributively. They can be intensified either by the postposed adverb modifier bad, by iteration, or by the use of the adverb modifier onli. Iteration is here the usual way. Comparatives and superlatives are constructed according to morphosyntactic rules. A comparative is made by adding -a to the stem ("taal" – "taala" – tall). The morpheme den is employed to form comparative statements: for instance, "hî tɑlɑ dan shee" – He is taller than she. Superlatives are created by adding -es to the stem. In all cases, the use of the definite article di is obligatory. The copula is present if the superlative is used predicatively. An example could be: "She dah di taales" – She is the tallest.

=== Adverbs ===
Adverbs are used much as they are in Standard English. In almost all cases, they differ from adjectives not in form but in function. There are, however, a few exceptions, such as "properli" (properly), "errli" (early) or "po:li" (poorly). Adverbs can be intensified by reduplication.

=== Conjunctions ===
Most Kriol conjunctions are very similar to English and are employed in the same way. The main difference is that Kriol allows double negation, so that some conjunctions are used differently. Some examples of conjunctions in Kriol are: "an" (and), "but" (but), "if" (if), "o:" (or) etc.

Questions usually take the same form in Kriol as they do in Standard English: question word + subject + verb. The "do-support" does not occur here either. The rising intonation at the end of the sentence may increase even more if no question word is used. Thus, most declarative sentences can become interrogative with the right intonation. "Which" has various translations in Kriol. If the speaker means "which", he uses witʂ, but he can also use witʂ wan for "which one".

== Grammar ==
The tense/aspect system of Kriol is fundamentally unlike that of English. There are no morphologically marked past tense forms corresponding to English -ed -t. There are three preverbal particles: "mi" and "did" for the past, "di" as an "aspect marker", and a host of articles to indicate the future ("(w)a(n)", "gwein", "gouɲ"). These are not verbs, they are simply invariant particles that cannot stand alone, unlike the English "to be". Their function differs somewhat from English.

The progressive is marked by /di~de/. Past habitual is marked by /doz/ or /juustu/. The present habitual aspect is unmarked but can be indicated by "always", "usually", etc. (i.e. is absent as a grammatical category). Mufwene (1984) and Gibson and Levy (1984) propose a past-only habitual category marked by /juustu doz/, as in /weh wi juustu doz liv ih noh az koal az ya/ ("where we used to live is not as cold as here").

For the present tense, an uninflected verb combining with an iterative adverb expresses the habitual, as in /tam aalweiz noa entaim keiti tel pɑn hii/ ("Tom always knows when Katy tells/has told about him").

- "mi" is a "tense indicator"
- "di" is an "aspect marker"
- "(w)a(n)", "gwein", "gouɲ") are used to indicate the future
- /ai mi run/
  - I run (habitually); I ran
- /ai di run/
  - I am running
- /ai mi di run/
  - I was running
- /ai mi run/ or /Ai ɡaan run/
  - I have run; I had run
- /ai ɡouŋ run/, /ai wa(n) run/ or /ai ɡwein run/
  - I am going to run; I will run

Like many other Caribbean Creoles, /fi/ and /fu/ have a number of functions, including:

- Directional, dative, or benefactive preposition
  - /den di fait fu wii/ ("They are fighting for us")
- Genitive preposition (that is, marker of possession)
  - /da buk da fu mii / or /Dat da mi buk/ ("That's my book")
- Modal auxiliary expressing obligation or futurity
  - /hi fu kom op ya/ ("He should be coming here")
- Pre-infinitive complementizer
  - /unu hafu ker sontiŋ fu deŋ ɡarifuna fi biit deŋ miuzik/ ("You (plural) have to contribute something to the Garifuna People for playing their music")

=== The pronominal system ===
The pronominal system of Standard English can distinguish person, number, gender and case. Some varieties of Kriol do not have a gender or case distinction, though most do; but Kriol does distinguish between the second person singular and plural (you).

- I = /ai/ (occasionally mii in negations)
- me = /mii/ (exception is Ai, as in, "Mek ai tel yu")
- my, my, mine (possessive) = /mi~mai~mainz/
- you, you = /ju/
- your, yours = ju~jurs
- he, him = /hi/ (pronounced /i/ in the basilect varieties)
- she, her = /ʃi/ (pronounced /i/; no gender distinction in basilect varieties)
- him, her = /a/ (no gender distinction in basilect varieties)
- him = /hi/
- her = /ʃi/
- we, us = wi~wii
- us (3 or more)= /all a wii/
- our, ours = /fuwii; wai; wainz/
- you (plural) = /unu; all a ju/
- they, them = /den; dem/)
- those = /dende/

=== Interrogatives ===
The question words found in Kriol are:

- What? = /Waat?; Wah?/
- Why? = /Wai?/
- Where? = /Weh?; Wehpaat?/ (What part?)
- Who? = /Huu?/
- Whose? = /Fihuu?/ (For whom?)
- The supporting That = /Weh/

=== Copula ===
- the Kriol equative verb is also "da"
  - e.g. /Ai da di tiicha/ ("I am the teacher")
- Kriol has a separate locative verb "deh"
  - e.g. /wi de da london/ or /wi de iina london/ ("we are in London")
- with true adjectives in Kriol, no copula is needed

Contrasting copula forms

Copula = helping-verb forms of “be”

Kriol: Ai da di teecha

English: I am the teacher.

Kriol: Yu da di teecha.

English: You are the teacher

Kriol: Ih da di teecha.

English: He/She is the teacher.

Kriol: Ah da-mi di teecha

English: I was the teacher

Kriol: Yu da-mi di teecha

English: You were the teacher.

Kriol: She/Ih da-mi di teecha.

English: She/He was the teacher.

Kriol: Da huu dat?

English: who is that?

=== Negation ===
- /no/ is used as a present tense negator:
  - /if wa cow neva no ih cu swalla ɡrass, ih neva mi wa try it/ ("If the cow didn't know that he could swallow grass, he wouldn't have tried it")
- /kiaa/ is used in the same way as English 'can't'
  - /hii da wa sikli lii ting weh kiaa iiven maʃ wa ant/ ("He is a sickly thing that can't even mash an ant")
- /neva/ is a negative past participle.
  - /dʒan neva teef di moni/ ("John did not steal the money")

== See also ==
- English-based creole languages
- Miskito Coastal Creole
- Jamaican Patois
- San Andrés-Providencia Creole
- Bocas del Toro Creole
- Colón Creole
- Rio Abajo Creole
- Limón Coastal Creole
- Languages of Belize
