= Belizean English =

English dialect native to Belize

Coordinates: 17.056°N 88.667°W

- Region: Belize
- Speakers: 278,390 (2022)
- Language family: Indo-European: Germanic; West Germanic; Ingvaeonic; Anglo-Frisian; Anglic; English; Caribbean English; Belizean English
- Early forms: Old English: Middle English; 17th century Modern English
- Standard forms: Standard Caribbean English (Note: Standard English [in Belize] is West Indian, generally somewhat creolised [ie influenced by Belizean Creole] except in formal situations and in school. — Ammon et al. 2006, p. 2077 However, Ammon et al. 2006, p. 2087 note that 'forms of [the English] language approximating Internationally Acceptable English exist in each territory [of the Anglophone Caribbean], under local labels such as Standard Guyanese English, Standard Belizean English, etc., or under the regional label of Standard Caribbean English.' Standard Caribbean English is thought to be authoritatively described by the Dictionary of Caribbean English Usage, which defines the former as 'the literate English of educated nationals of Caribbean territories [including Belize] and their spoken English such as is considered natural in formal social contexts' (Ammon et al. 2006, pp. 2088–2089).)
- Writing system: Latin (English alphabet)

Official status
- Official language in: Belize

Language codes
- ISO 639-3: –
- IETF: en-BZ
- Percentage of people in each district who reported being able to speak English in the 2022 census. 55–60% 60–65% 65–70% 70–75% 75–80% 80–85% 85–90%
- Coordinates

Belizean English is the set of varieties of the English language spoken in Belize and by members of the Belizean diaspora.

English is the sole official language of Belize and is used as a lingua franca throughout the country. In the 2022 census, 278,390 people reported being able to speak English, accounting for 70.0% of the country's population, making English the most spoken language in the country (ahead of Spanish which is dominant in some parts of the country). While a majority of the population in every district can speak English, it is less commonly spoken in the southern part of the country (namely the districts of Stann Creek and Toledo).

== History ==
The development of Caribbean English, including Belizean English, is dated to the West Indian exploits of Elizabethan sea dogs, which are credited with introducing to England names for Caribbean flora, fauna, and various other things via, for instance, Hakluyt's Principall Navigations of 1589 and Raleigh's Discoverie of the Empyre of Guiana of 1596. As English settlements followed shortly thereafter, Caribbean English has been deemed "the oldest exportation of that language from its British homeland".

== Phonology ==
Pronunciation in Belizean English tends towards Caribbean English, except that the former is non-rhotic. (Note: McArthur, Lam-McArthur & Fontaine 2018, entry on 'Caribbean English' describe the distinctive features of West Indian pronunciation as –: 1. rhythm tends to be syllable-timed, 2. there are fewer diphthongs than in Received Pronunciation, 3. final consonant clusters tend to be reduced, 4. there is a preference for a clear /l/ in words like milk, fill, rather than the dark /l/ of Received Pronunciation.)

In 2013, it was noted that spoken Belizean English is heavily influenced by Belizean Creole, as 'both the lexicon and syntactic constructions often follow creole.' The influence has been deemed strong enough to argue 'that spoken [Belizean] English is simply a register of creole, relexified and restructured through contact with mainstream [non-Belizean] English.' (Note: Blench 2013, p. 2, for instance, recommends the treatment of Belizean English and Belizean Creole 'as registers of one another,' arguing that 'purely in dialectal terms this [the claim of Creole's being distinct to English] is simply not true, as the Creole and Belizean English share almost all their lexicon and grammar.' Further, Schneider 2017, p. 69 notes that 'it can be difficult to distinguish [Belizean] Kriol and [Belizean] English in structural terms.' Schneider 2017, p. 69 additionally observes 'a widespread insecurity [among Belizeans] when it comes to defining what is [Belizean] English and what is [Belizean] Kriol.' Schneider 2017, pp. 69–70 posits – It seems that in informal forms of everyday language practice, many speakers in Belize have developed a kind of fused lect where grammatical differences between the codes [English and Kriol] do not necessarily have a boundary marking function and where, therefore, it has become difficult to differentiate codes. Indeed, [...] it can be maintained that what would elsewhere [outside of Belize] be regarded as non-standard forms [of English] (e.g. lack of subject-verb agreement) is appropriate, for example, in public governmental signage or in school signposts, while most of the lexical forms that are defined as Kriol in explicit language ideological discourse are in fact the same as in English, sometimes (but not always) with a slightly different pronunciation. — Schneider 2017, pp. 69–70 Schneider 2017, pp. 69–70 go on to suggest that the English–Kriol boundary may be pragmatically marked by 'sound features like pitch, intonation and speed rhythm,' rather than by structural differences such as grammar.) However, it has been further noted that one may describe this phenomenon 'from the opposite perspective and claim [Belizean] creole to be a register of [Belizean] English.'

== Lexicology ==
The largest proportion of the lexicon unique to Belizean English is thought to name local flora, fauna, and cuisine. Notably, the most significant donor language to this portion of Belizean English lexicon is thought to be the Miskito language, not Mayan languages, 'as might be expected.' Other donor languages include Mayan languages, African languages (via Jamaican English), and Spanish (particularly for cuisine). (Note: African languages, however, are deemed the most significant donor languages to Caribbean English (Allsopp 2003, p. xxxii).)

Sample of lexical items unique to Belizean English. (Note: Some lexical items may be common to other dialects of Caribbean English, eg Jamaican English. Note, PoS, p.n, n. stand for Part of Speech, proper noun, noun.)
Item	PoS	Gloss	Notes
Agayuma	p.n.	water-spirit; like will o' the wisp or jack o' lantern	fm. Garifuna; cf
alania	n.	beverage; made of grated cassava	fm. Garifuna; cf
alcalde	n.	local government office; in Mayan settlements	fm. Spanish; cf
alligator fish	n.	fish species; Belonesox belizanus	cf
altamesa	n.	plant species	cf
amapola / amopolla	n.	tree species; Pseudobombax ellipticum	fm Spanish; cf
Anansi	p.n.	lead character in folk-tales	fm Akan; cf
anansi	n.	1. spider; 2. someone who is sly or tricky	cf
antelope	n.	red brocket deer	cf
apasote	n.	herb species; Dysphania ambrosioides	fm Nahuatl; cf
apple banana	n.	banana cultivar	cf
areba / ereba	n.	round flat bread; made of grated cassava	fm Spanish; cf
axe-master	n.	tree species; Caesalpinia gaumeri	cf
baboon	n.	howler monkey	cf
baboon cap	n.	herb species; Couepia dodecandra	cf

In 2013, it was noted that spelling in official contexts, such as in government, tended to follow British conventions, while that in commercial spaces tended to prefer American usage, with spelling in popular written media described as "highly inconsistent, following the conventions of the writer". (Note: Allsopp 2003, p. xix observed that over 90 per cent of dictionaries used in the West Indies, including Belize, were published in England.)

== Sociolinguistics ==
In 2017, it was noted that –

[The emergence of Belizean English as a distinct dialect] is highly contested among Belizeans and perceived as discrediting by most of [the informants in a 2017 sociolinguistic study] – the status of exogamous 'proper' English is high and most of [the study's] informants perceived the suggestion that there is an endogamous variety as almost offensive.

— Britta Schneider in 2017.

The aforementioned study suggested that such attitude towards Belizean English might be related to attitudes towards code-switching between English and Kriol, as the latter was described by the study's Belizean informants 'as an index for educational attainment and therefore for class, as it apparently requires formal training to learn to differentiate the two [ie English and Kriol].' However, the social regard for exogamous dialects of English is thought to be decreasing in Belize, though this has been linked to a concomitant rise in the prestige of Belizean Creole, rather than that of Belizean English. (Note: However, the former is popularly regarded by Belizeans as 'a dialect of English' (Schneider 2021, pp. 32, 35). Further, (Schneider 2021, pp. 31–32) posits that this association with English may partly explain Kriol's increasing prestige.)

== Study ==
The earliest scholarly dictionary of Caribbean English is thought to have been the 1967 Dictionary of Jamaican English. During Easter of that same year, the Caribbean Association of Headmasters and Headmistresses resolved –

Be it resolved that this Association request the appropriate department of the University of the West Indies to compile a list of lexical items in each territory and to circulate these to schools for the guidance of teachers.

— Resolution 6 of the CAHH Conference of Easter 1967.

Said resolution was promptly forwarded to Richard Allsopp, who by mid-1967 'already had some ten shoe-boxes each of about 1,000 6 × 4 cards and many loose unfiled cuttings, notes and other material [from Guyana, the Lesser Antilles, Belize, Jamaica, and Trinidad].' In 1971, Allsopp introduced the Caribbean Lexicography Project as 'a survey of [English] usage in the intermediate and upper ranges of the West Indian speech continuum.' This set the stage for the seminal Dictionary of Caribbean English Usage, first published 1996. (Note: Allsopp 2003, p. xxxi likens the publication to that of Webster's in 1828, the Dictionary of Canadian English in 1967, and the Australian National Dictionary in 1988.)

In 2013, it was noted that Belizean English may not constitute a single dialect. For instance, the English spoken in Garifuna-majority settlements in the southeastern coast of Belize 'includes distinctive borrowings which are not found elsewhere in the country.' It was further noted that, though Belizean English is not a tonal language, some of its words 'are not correctly pronounced unless the relative pitch heights are accurate.'

== Notes and references ==
=== Full citations ===
1. Allsopp, Richard, ed. (2003). Dictionary of Caribbean English Usage. Kingston: University of the West Indies Press. ISBN 9789766401450. ProQuest 2352573179.
2. Allsopp, Richard, ed. (2010). New register of Caribbean English usage. Kingston: University of the West Indies Press. ISBN 9789766402280. OCLC 535494345.
3. Ammon, Ulrich; Dittmar, Norbert; Mattheier, Klaus J.; Trudgill, Peter, eds. (2006). Sociolinguistics : An International Handbook of the Science of Language and Society. Handbooks of Linguistics and Communication Sciences; 3.3. Vol. 3 (2nd completely revised and extended ed.). Berlin; New York: Walter de Gruyter. doi:10.1515/9783110184181.3. ISBN 9783110199871. OCLC 174262379.
4. Blench, Roger (15 March 2013). A Dictionary of Belize English. Draft circulated for comment. Archived from the original on 29 January 2022.
5. Eberhard, David M.; Simons, Gary F.; Fennig, Charles D., eds. (2022). Ethnologue : Languages of the World (25th ed.). Dallas, TX: SIL International.
6. Gorlach, Manfred; Holm, John A., eds. (1986). Focus on the Caribbean. Varieties of English around the world; General series; v. 8. Berlin; New York: John Benjamins Publishing Co. ISBN 9027248664. OCLC 14588593.
7. Holm, John, ed. (1983). Central American English. Varieties of English around the world : Text ser.; 2. Heidelberg: Julius Groos. ISBN 3872762958. OCLC 9818255.
8. McArthur, Tim; Lam-McArthur, Jacqueline; Fontaine, Lisa, eds. (2018). The Oxford Companion to the English Language (2nd ed.). Oxford: Oxford University Press. doi:10.1093/acref/9780199661282.001.0001. ISBN 9780191744389.
9. Ogilvie, Sarah, ed. (2020). The Cambridge companion to English dictionaries. Cambridge companions to literature. Cambridge: Cambridge University Press. doi:10.1017/9781108553780. ISBN 9781108553780. S2CID 243603808.
10. Rodríguez González, Félix, ed. (1996). Spanish loanwords in the English language : a tendency towards hegemony reversal. Topics in English Linguistics : 18. Berlin; New York: Mouton de Gruyter. ISBN 3110148455. OCLC 34029435.
11. Schneider, Britta (Spring 2017). "'It's Kriol they're speaking!' – Constructing Language Boundaries in Multilingual and Ethnically Complex Communities". Bulletin VALS-ASLA. No. spécial t. 1: 63–73. ISSN 1023-2044. oai:doc.rero.ch:20170502121737-NX.
12. Schneider, Britta (March 2021). "Creole prestige beyond modernism and methodological nationalism : Multiplex patterns, simultaneity and non-closure in the sociolinguistic economy of a Belizean village". Journal of Pidgin and Creole Languages. 36 (1): 12–45. doi:10.1075/jpcl.00068.sch. S2CID 230576173.
13. Schneider, Edgar W.; Kortmann, Bernd, eds. (2004). A Handbook of Varieties of English : A Multimedia Reference Tool. Berlin; New York: Mouton de Gruyter. ISBN 3110175320. OCLC 56880203.
14. Wells, John C., ed. (1982). Beyond the British Isles. Accents of English. Vol. 3. Berlin; New York: Cambridge University Press. ISBN 0521242258. OCLC 7578097.
