= Gustavia English =

Variety of English

- Region: Caribbean
- Language family: Indo-European: Germanic; West Germanic; Ingvaeonic; Anglo-Frisian; Anglic; English; North American English; Caribbean English; Gustavia English
- Early forms: Old English: Middle English; Early Modern English

Language codes
- ISO 639-3: –
- Glottolog: None
- IETF: en-BL

Gustavia English is a variety of English spoken in the port city of Gustavia, on the French island of St. Barthélemy in the Caribbean's Leeward Islands. With the smallest population of English speakers in the Caribbean (Caribbean English), it is likely the most endangered variety. The majority of Gustavia English speakers are Afro-European, while the rest of the island's population is predominantly white and French-speaking. St. Barthélemy, often called St. Barths, separated from Guadeloupe in 2007 to become an overseas collectivity. The island, covering 21 km^{2}, relies mainly on tourism and has a population of 2,332.

Unlike neighboring islands, Gustavia English did not undergo a creolization process. While there may be slight influences from Saint Kitts Creole, the language shows closer ties to nonstandard English varieties from the British Isles and North America. The social environment in Gustavia, where immigrants lived in close social relationships with their slaves, likely contributed to this distinct linguistic development.

== Phonology ==
=== Lax vowels ===
In Gustavia English, lax vowels are most commonly found in closed syllables, where the syllable ends with a consonant. When the syllable has no onset (beginning consonant) or coda (ending consonant), the pronunciation of these lax vowels tends to vary more. The word "with" is pronounced as /wɪd/ in Gustavia English, where the lax vowel /ɪ/ remains stable in the closed syllable. However, in open syllables where the syllable does not end with a consonant, as in the initial syllables of words like "because" (/bɪˈkɔz/), "behind" (/bɪˈhaɪnd/), "believe" (/bɪˈliv/), and "before" (/bɪˈfɔr/), the vowel /ɪ/ shows considerable variation, appearing as [ɪ̝], [ɪ], or [¨ı]. In unstressed syllables, such as the first syllables of the words "because," "behind," "believe," and "before," the height and roundness of the vowel can become less distinct, leading to variations.

- Dress Vowel (/ɛ/): The dress vowel /ɛ/ in Gustavia English is relatively stable in closed syllables but shows more variation in open syllables, particularly in high-frequency words. In the word "they," this vowel can vary from [dɛ] to [de̞ɪ]. The vowel /ɛ/ in words like "make," "take," and "catch" in Gustavia English aligns with regional dialects in England where the vowel /ɛ/ is preserved, unlike in Standard English where it evolved into /eɪ/.
- Trap Vowel (/æ/): The trap vowel /æ/ occurs in both closed and open syllables in Gustavia English. It is significant because it is present in Standard English but not in the basilectal (more creole-influenced) St. Kitts Creole. In open syllables, the trap vowel /æ/ may centralize slightly to [ɐ], as in some examples of Gustavia English speech. The presence of the trap vowel in Gustavia English indicates that it has not undergone the same restructuring seen in creole languages like St. Kitts Creole or Antiguan English.
- Palm Vowel (/ɑ/): The palm vowel /ɑ/ in Gustavia English is generally stable, though it may shift forward to [ɐ] in open syllables. The word "was" (/wɑz/) can sometimes be pronounced as [wʌz], showing a shift to the strut vowel /ʌ/. Unlike in other Caribbean English Creoles, where there is a clear distinction between a lengthened palm vowel /ɑː/ and an unlengthened vowel /ɑ/, this distinction is less prevalent in Gustavia English.
- Strut Vowel (/ʌ/): The strut vowel /ʌ/ is present in Gustavia English, but often as a diaphoneme (a variant that represents different underlying phonemes) of other vowels. The word "cut" is usually pronounced as [kot] or [kɵt], with a few examples of [kʌt]. Similarly, "come" is generally pronounced as [kõm] but can also be [ko̞m] or [kʌm]. The variation in the strut vowel may be a remnant of an incomplete "foot–strut split," a process that occurred during the transition from Middle English to Early Modern English. Additionally, some words that typically use the palm vowel, like "was" (/wɑz/), might be pronounced with the strut vowel [wʌz]. The strut vowel appears in words like "us" (/ʌs/), which is not commonly used in Caribbean English Creoles but is found in Gustavia English, indicating less influence from other Caribbean pronunciations.
- Foot Vowel (/ʊ/): The foot vowel /ʊ/ is infrequent in Gustavia English and usually appears in closed syllables. Words like "would" (/wʊd/) and "could" (/kʊd/) may exhibit the foot vowel. The word "to" is sometimes produced as [tʊ], sometimes used [tu]. Variations are also observed in words like "full" (/fʊl/), which can be pronounced as [ful] or [fʊl], and "good" (/ɡʊd/), pronounced as [ɡud] or [ɡʊd]. This variation aligns with historical pronunciation patterns in seventeenth-century Northern English, where words like "good" and "look" fluctuated between [uː] and [ʊ].

=== Tense vowels and diphthongs ===
Tense vowels in Gustavia English tend to be stable, with little variation in pronunciation. Unlike most Caribbean English Creoles, where tense vowels are typically lengthened to contrast with shorter lax vowels, Gustavia English shows no significant lengthening of tense vowels.

- Fleece Vowel (/i/): The fleece vowel /i/ is stable in both open and closed syllables in Gustavia English and is more akin to North American English than British English. The word "teachers" (/tiːʧɐs/) sometimes shows lengthening of the fleece vowel, and "easier" (/iːzjɑ/) does as well, reflecting a feature that may have originated from Early Modern English.
- Face Vowel (/e/) In General American (GA) and Received Pronunciation (RP) English, the face vowel is a diphthong (/eɪ/), but in Gustavia English, it is often a monophthong (/e/). The word "sailing" is pronounced as /selɪn/ in Gustavia English. Additionally, "maybe" can vary between /mebi/ and /meɪbi/. This monophthongal pronunciation is similar to varieties of English spoken in Northern England, Ireland, and Scotland. Occasionally, there is convergence with Standard English pronunciation, possibly due to schooling. Some pronounce "name" as /nɪɛm/, reflecting the basilectal St. Kitts Creole pronunciation, though this influence in Gustavia English is limited.
- Goat Vowel (/o/): The goat vowel is typically a monophthong (/o/) in Gustavia English, contrasting with the diphthongs /oʊ/ in General American English and /əʊ/ in Received Pronunciation. The word "nobody" is pronounced as /nobɑdɪ/ in Gustavia English. In rapid speech, this vowel may centralize to [ɵ], lose its rounding to [ɤ], or even drop as low as [ʌ], depending on the context. In some instances, the goat vowel becomes nasalized, such as in "come" (/kõm/) or "don’t" (/dõ/). Some pronounce "boat" as /bʊot/, similar to the St. Kitts Creole pronunciation, though this convergence is rare in Gustavia English.
- Goose Vowel (/uː/): The goose vowel /uː/ in Gustavia English is quite stable, meaning it does not vary much in pronunciation and occurs consistently in both open (e.g., "too" /tuː/) and closed syllables (e.g., "food" /fuːd/).
- Mouth Diphthong (/aʊ/): The mouth diphthong /aʊ/ is also stable in Gustavia English, appearing in both open and closed syllables, similar to how it is pronounced in General American and Received Pronunciation English. The word "mouth" would be pronounced as /maʊθ/ in Gustavia English, with the diphthong starting at a low or mid position and gliding to a high, back, rounded position. While the typical pronunciation in Gustavia English is /aʊ/, some informants showed variation. For example, some pronounce the diphthong as /ou/ at the start of a word, and some use /ʌo/ before a velar nasal, as in the word "found" /fʌoŋd/. This variation suggests a possible but weak influence from St. Kitts Creole (SKC), where /ou/ is the norm for the mouth vowel.
- Choice Vowel (/ɔɪ/): In many Caribbean English Creoles, the choice vowel /ɔɪ/ has merged with the price vowel /ɑɪ/, leading to pronunciations that are unrounded. However, in Gustavia English, this shift is less common, though there are some examples. Words like "boys," "point," and "voice" might be pronounced as /bɑɪz/, /pɑɪnt/, and /wɑɪs/ respectively, showing a merger with the price vowel /ɑɪ/. This reflects a convergence with other Caribbean English varieties. In contrast, Gustavia English sometimes exhibits the opposite pattern, where the price vowel /ɑɪ/ begins at a low rounded position, merging with the choice vowel /ɔɪ/. Older speakers and historical samples often show this raised and rounded beginning, leading to pronunciations such as "side" as /sɔɪd/, "island" as /ɔɪlɑn/, "while" as /wɔɪl/ and"find" as /fɔɪn/. Younger speakers tend to use /ɑɪ/ or a slightly raised /ɐɪ/ for these words, indicating a possible generational shift in pronunciation.
- Price Vowel (/ɑɪ/): The price vowel /ɑɪ/ is very stable in Gustavia English, meaning it consistently appears in its expected form across various words and contexts, similar to Standard English. It occurs in both open and closed syllables without significant variation. The word "time" would be pronounced as /taɪm/, following the expected pattern for the price vowel. As noted, there are instances where the price vowel /ɑɪ/ merges with the choice vowel /ɔɪ/ or vice versa, but in general, the price vowel remains distinct and stable in Gustavia English.

=== Consonants ===
- TH-stopping is a feature common in Gustavia English, where the interdental fricatives /θ/ and /ð/ merge with /t/ and /d/.
- Word-final consonant cluster reduction is frequently observed in Gustavia English. This phenomenon occurs when a consonant at the end of a word is omitted. For example:

The /nd > n/ reduction: /dɪ sɛkɑn tɔɪm/ ("the second time") The /kt > k/ reduction: "fact" becomes "fac" The /nt > n/ reduction: "plant" becomes "plan," and in some cases, the nasal consonant is eliminated, leading to the nasalization of the preceding vowel. The /st > s/ reduction: "past" becomes "pas."

- Rhoticity, or the pronunciation of /r/ after vowels, is a variable feature in Gustavia English. In most cases, postvocalic /r/ is dropped, as seen in /ɑbɑʊt tɛn jɛɑz ɑftɑ/ ("about ten years after"). However, there are a few instances where the postvocalic /r/ and rhotic vowels /ɝ/ are retained, as in /deɪ ɑr lɝnɨŋ/ ("they are learning"). The limited presence of postvocalic /r/ in Gustavia English may suggest a lack of significant linguistic influence from fully rhotic dialects like that of Barbados.
- V–W confusion, where /v/ and /w/ are used interchangeably, is sometimes observed in Gustavia English. There are instances where /v/ shifts to /w/, as in /yugɑt ɑ mɑn wɔɪs/ ("you have a man’s voice"), and cases where /w/ shifts to /v/, as in /vɛl vɪn di ɑmɛrɪkɪn siplen/ ("well, when the American seaplane"). Notably, this feature is less common among younger speakers.
- Palatalization of velar plosives, which involves the softening of /k/ and /ɡ/ sounds before the palm vowel /ɑː/, is observed in many varieties of English, including Gustavia English. However, this feature is rare in Gustavia English.
- The velar nasal: in Gustavia English, there is a shift in words that originally had the mouth vowel /aʊ/ before an alveolar nasal /n/, resulting in the goat vowel /o/ followed by a velar nasal /ŋ/. For example, /maʊntɪn/ ("mountain") becomes /moŋtɪn/. Older speakers consistently produce this form, as in /toŋ/ ("town"), /kroŋ/ ("crown"), and /pronõŋs/ ("pronounce"). Younger speakers show more variability, sometimes producing /raon/, /ɑrɑon/, /ɑrɑʊŋ/ ("around"), and /toŋ/ ("town"). The presence of this feature in Gustavia English does not seem to have clear roots in either English or African languages.
