= Languages of Belize =

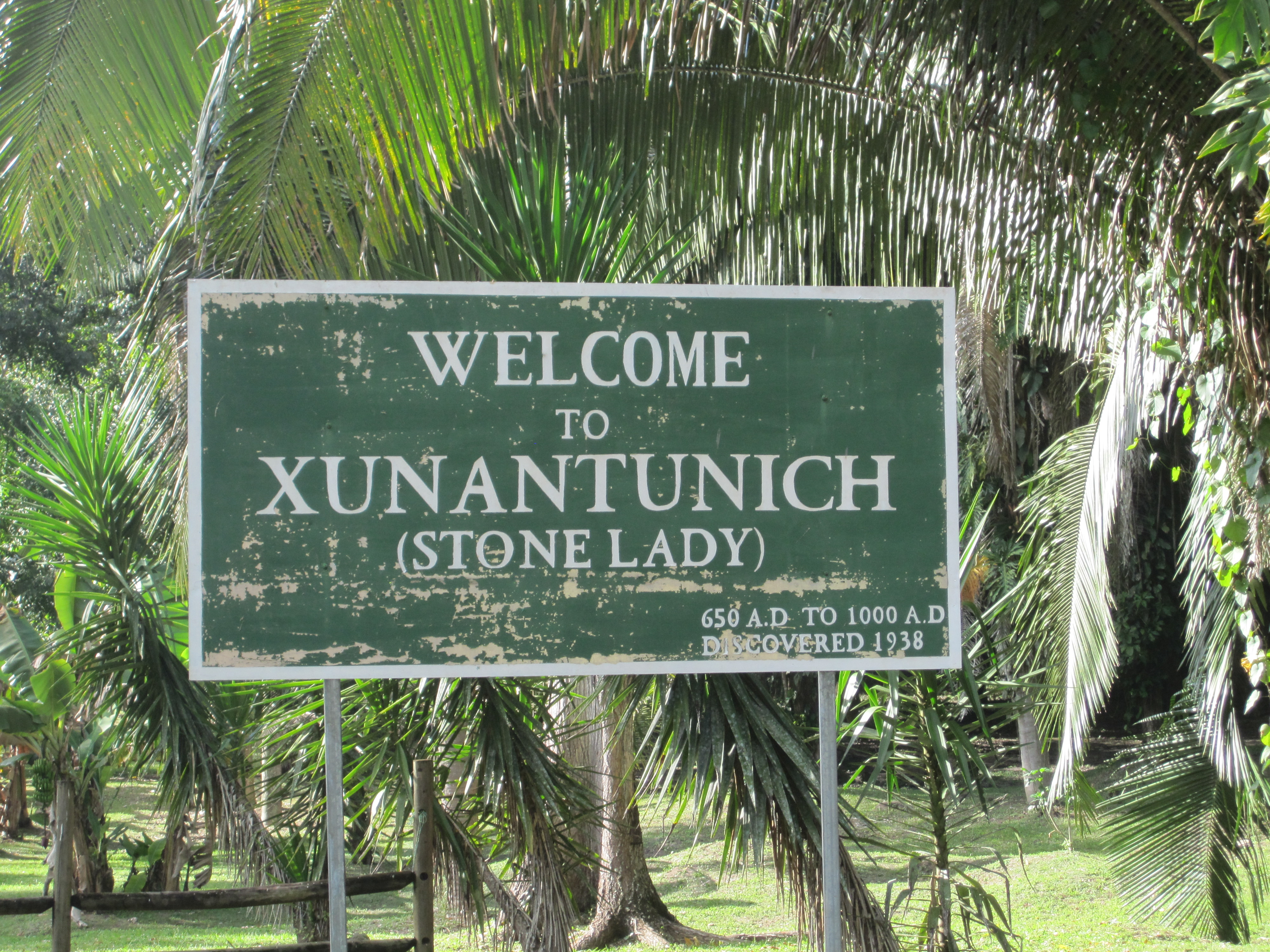
- Sign in English at Xunantunich, with the Mayan name translated into English
- Official: English
- Indigenous: Q'eqchi', Mopan, Yucatec Maya
- Vernacular: Belizean English, Belizean Spanish, Belizean Creole
- Minority: German, Garifuna, Plautdietsch
- Foreign: Spanish
- Signed: American Sign Language

The major languages spoken in Belize include English, Spanish and Kriol, all three spoken by more than 40% of the population. Mayan languages are also spoken in certain areas.

English is the official language and the primary language of public education, though spoken natively by a minority of people as a first language. Spanish is taught in primary and secondary schools as well. Multilingualism is very common, with a majority of the population speaking both English and Spanish, and just under half also knowing Kriol. The percentage of literacy in Belize as of 2021 is 82.68% for those aged 15 or older.

Languages spoken in Belize (2022)
Language	speakers	percentage
English	278,390	75.5%
Spanish	199,393	54.0%
Belizean Creole	180,792	49.0%
Q'eqchi' Maya	23,315	6.3%
Mopan Maya	14,479	3.9%
German*	11,294	3.1%
Garifuna	7,481	2.0%
Yucatec Maya	1,822	0.5%
Chinese**	1,420	0.4%
Other languages	3,017	0.8%

*German includes Plautdietsch and Standard German
**Chinese includes Cantonese and Mandarin

== Major languages by district ==
Percentage of people in each district of Belize who reported being able to speak each language in the 2022 census. From left to right: English, Spanish, Creole, Mayan languages, German/Plautdietsch and Garifuna.
Legend
- 0–5%
  5–10%
  10–15%
  15–20%
  20–25%
  25–30%
  30–35%
  35–40%
  40–45%
  45–50%
  50–55%
  55–60%
  60–65%
  65–70%
  70–75%
  75–80%
  80–85%
  85–90%

English is the major language in the primary and most populated Belize District, the capital district of Cayo, and southernmost district of Toledo. Spanish is the most used language in the frontier districts of Orange Walk and Corozal. Creole is the main language in the Stann Creek district.

Languages spoken by District (2022)
District	Population	English	Spanish	Creole	Q'eqchi' Mayan
Belize District	113,630	85.8%	32.2%	72.9%	0.6%
Cayo	99,105	79.8%	69.7%	42.6%	2.4%
Orange Walk	54,152	71.9%	83.6%	17.1%	0.2%
Stann Creek	48,162	64.3%	36.5%	71.8%	8.2%
Corozal	45,310	67.5%	82.5%	19.1%	0.1%
Toledo	37,124	61.3%	24.3%	46.0%	49.3%
Total	397,483	75.5%	54.0%	49.0%	6.3%

== Standard English and Belizean Creole ==
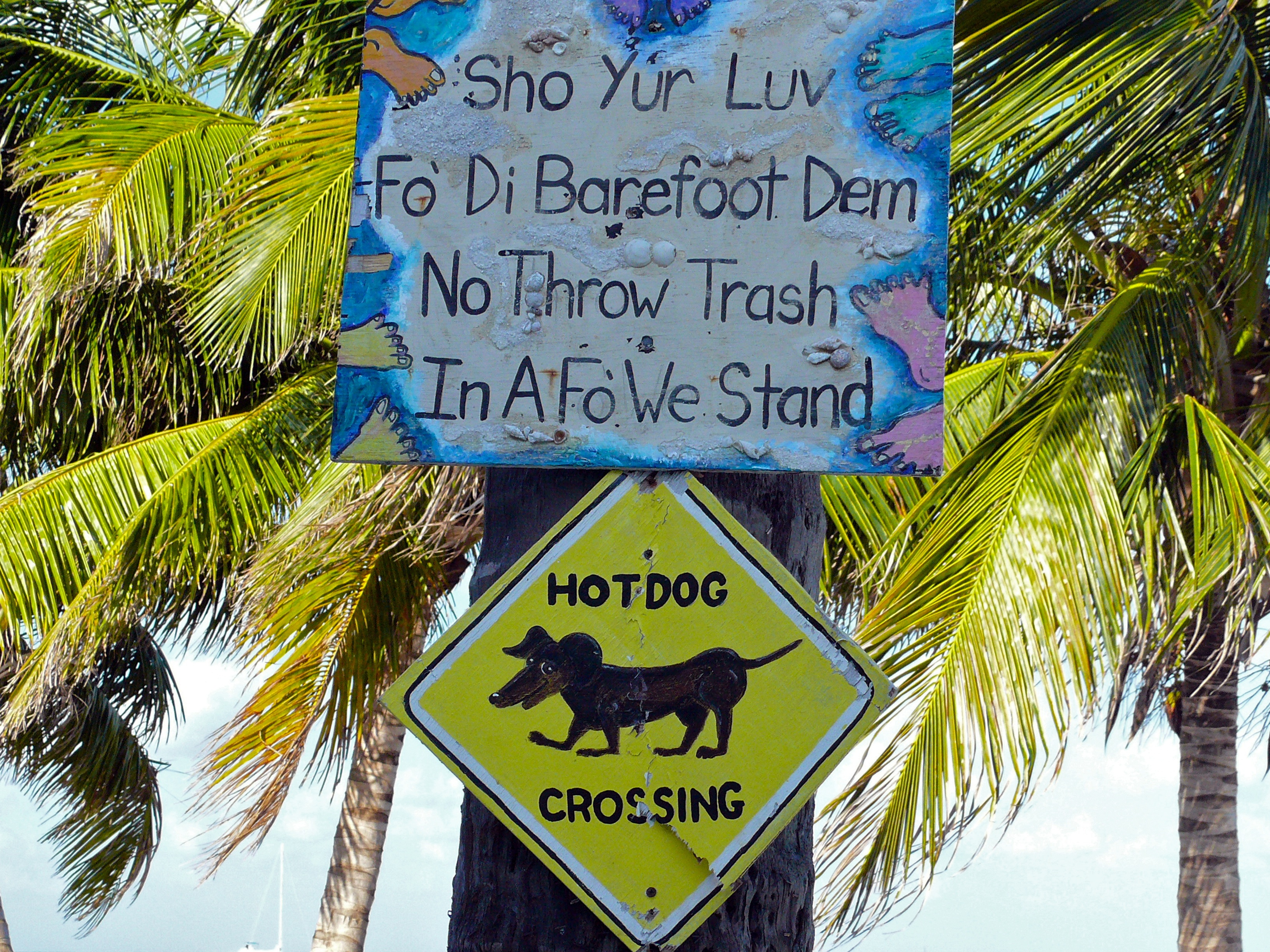
Sign in Kriol in Caye Caulker.

English is the official language of Belize, a former British colony. It is the primary language of public education, government and most media outlets. According to the 2008 Official Education policy in Belize, children are to be taught when it is appropriate to use Creole, but lessons are not to be taught in Creole language.

When a Creole language exists alongside its lexifier language, as in Belize, a creole continuum forms between the Creole and the lexifier language. This is known as code-switching.

In 2007 an English–Kriol dictionary was published by the Belize Kriol Project; the dictionary includes translations and grammatical descriptions.

== Spanish ==
Approximately 52.9% of Belizeans self-identify as Mestizo, Latino or Hispanic. Spanish is spoken as a native tongue by about 56.6% of the population, and taught in schools to children who do not have it as their first language. "Kitchen Spanish" is an intermediate form of Spanish mixed with Belizean Creole, and is spoken in northern towns such as Corozal and San Pedro.

Over half the population is bilingual, and a large segment is multilingual. Being such a small and multiethnic state surrounded by Spanish-speaking nations, multilingualism is strongly encouraged in the society.

== Other languages ==
Belize is also home to three Mayan languages: Q’eqchi’, the endangered indigenous Belizean language of Mopan, and Yucatec Maya.

Approximately 16,100 people speak the Arawakan-based Garifuna language.

German is spoken in Mennonite colonies and villages. The vast majority of Mennonites in Belize speaks Plautdietsch in everyday life while a minority of some 10 percent speaks Pennsylvania German. Both groups use the German Bible translation of Martin Luther and an old fashioned Standard German in church and in reading and writing.

== See also ==
- Kriol people
- Demographics of Belize
- Ethnic Chinese in Belize
- Maya peoples
