= English language in Puerto Rico =

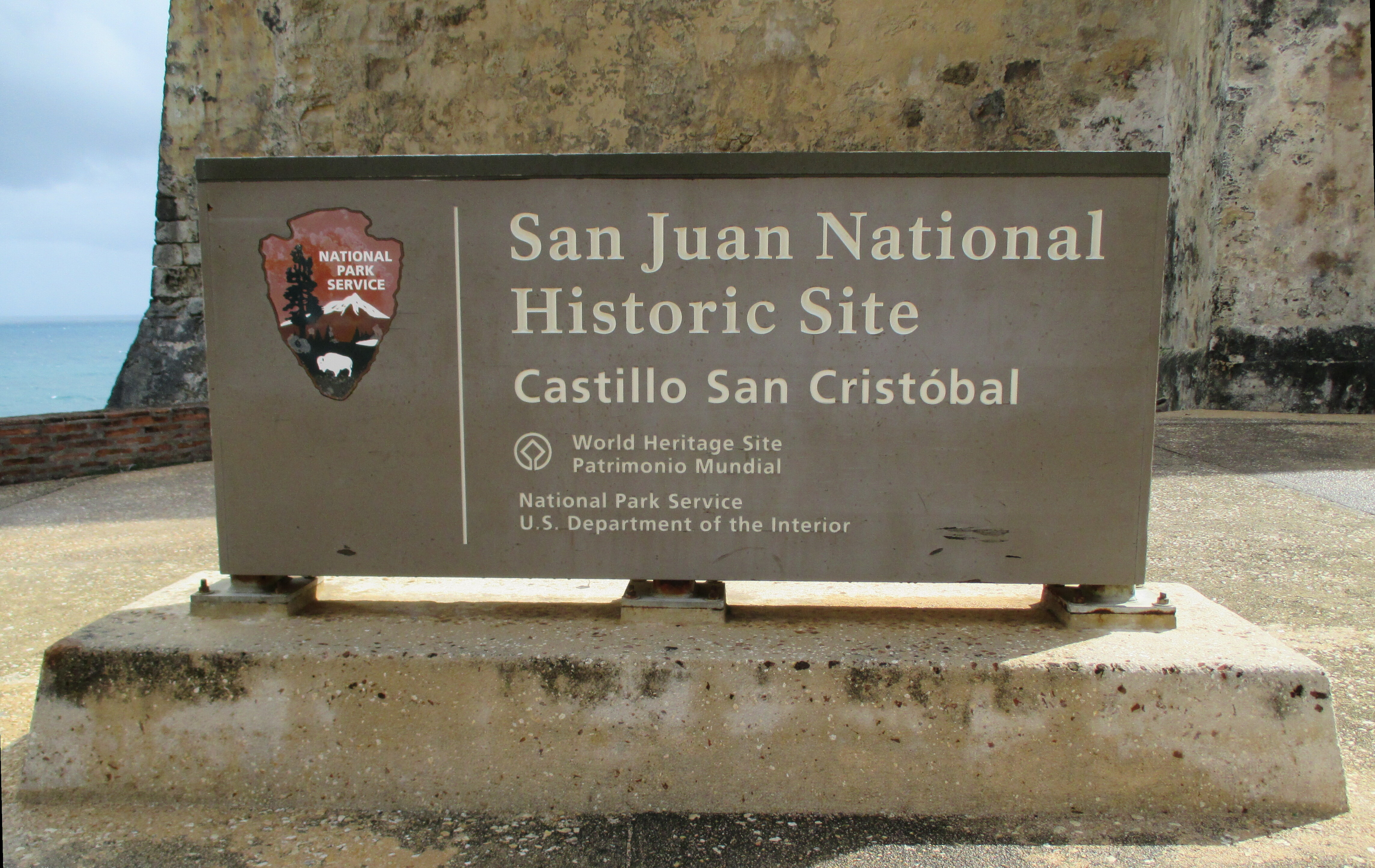
Sign in English at the Castillo San Cristóbal

English is taught as a mandatory subject in Puerto Rican schools and is one of the two official languages of the Commonwealth government. English and Spanish were first made co-official languages by the colonial government in 1902, but Spanish remained the primary language of everyday life and local government proceedings. English was removed as an official language in 1991 after the U.S. Congress had attempted to make English the primary language in order for Puerto Rico to join the union as the 51st state, but it was brought back as the second official language in 1993 and has remained the co-official language of the Commonwealth government since.

Spanish remains the most spoken and written language, and the vast majority of Puerto Ricans do not use English regularly other than some borrowed English words in their ordinary Spanish speech. Various surveys have found that the majority of Puerto Ricans are not fluent in English. Out of those age five and older, 76.6% of Puerto Ricans did not speak English "very well," and 94.5% spoke a language other than English at home.

== History ==
=== Government ===
In 1902, as part of the Foraker Act, the Official Languages Act was instituted mandating that English and Spanish should be "used indiscriminately" in all official and public activities, with translation provided as necessary. Some interpret this as part of an Americanization process, others as a necessity for the functioning of the Executive Council in charge of Puerto Rico at the time, of which few or none of the mainland appointees spoke Spanish.

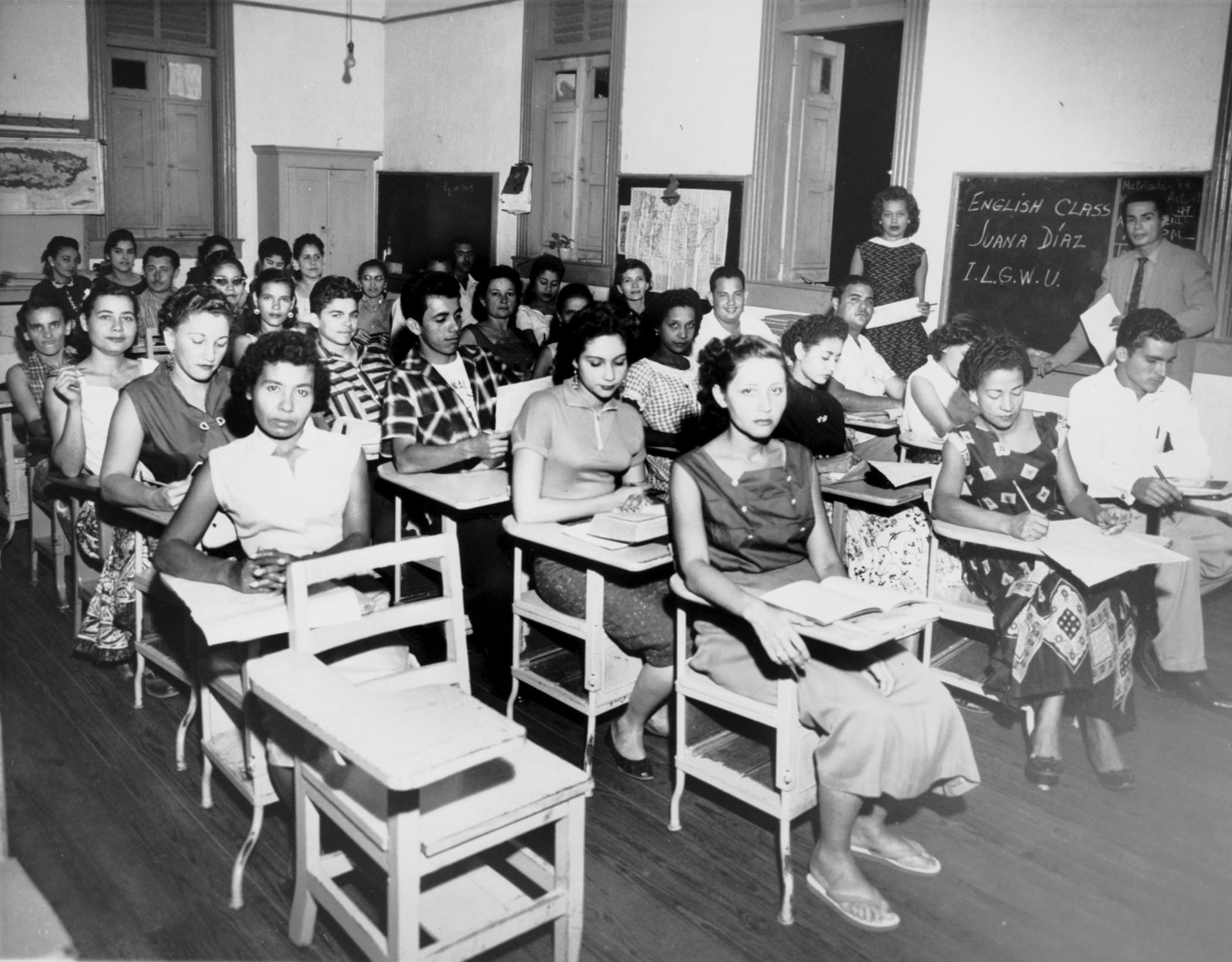
Puerto Ricans during an English class in Juana Díaz, 1968

After the Spanish–American War, English was the sole language used by the military government of Puerto Rico, which consisted of officials appointed by the U.S. Government. On 21 February 1902 a law was passed to use both English and Spanish as co-official languages in the government. When the new political status, the Commonwealth, came into effect in 1952, the Constitution stated nothing about the official language that would be used by the new government.

In 1991, the government of Puerto Rico, under the administration of PPD's Rafael Hernández Colón, made Spanish its sole official language through a law that was commonly called the "Spanish-only Law." In recognition of the historical defense of the Spanish language and culture, the Spanish Monarchy awarded Puerto Rico the Principe de Asturias' Prize that same year. However on 4 January 1993, the 12th Legislative Assembly, with the support of the newly elected PNP government of Pedro Rosselló González passed Senate Bill 1, establishing both Spanish and English as official languages of the government of Puerto Rico.

=== The people ===
In 2009, the grassroots community cultural organization Unidos por Nuestro Idioma ("United for our language"), whose goal is "defending Spanish in Puerto Rico", expressed concern that the use of English terms on official road signs reading "Welcome to Guaynabo City", and on mass transit ("City Hall" and "Downtown") as well as police cruisers ("San Juan Police Department") were evidence of the English language replacing Spanish in official use. The group advocates the defense and use of Spanish in Puerto Rico. The group states it is not against the use of English, recognizing the importance of Puerto Ricans learning it, but states that it should not displace Spanish.

=== Education ===
The same February 21, 1902 law that ordered the use of both English and Spanish as co-official languages in the government of Puerto Rico also made English the obligatory language of instruction in Puerto Rican high schools. In 1946, Vito Marcantonio introduced legislation to restore Spanish as the language of instruction in Puerto Rican schools, asking President Truman to sign the bill, "in the name of the children of Puerto Rico who are being tortured by the prevailing system…to fight cultural chauvinism and to correct past errors." President Truman signed the bill. In 1948, schools were able to return to teaching in the Spanish language, but English was required in schools as a second language. In 1948, as a result of a decree by the Education Commissioner Mariano Villaronga, Spanish became the official language of instruction in schools, for all but the English course. The decree was binding on public schools.

=== Comparison with other Spanish-speaking territories ===
Puerto Rico had about a million residents at the time it was ceded by Spain to the United States in 1898. Since 1898, the heads of the departments of education put forth "seven different language policies" for the teaching of English languages in Puerto Rico schools. By way of contrast, the Spanish-speaking settlers in the vast territories obtained from Mexico after the Mexican–American War were promptly swamped by English-speaking American settlers, which is why the state governments that emerged in those territories all primarily use English today.

== Present use ==
=== Government ===
The official languages of the executive branch of government of Puerto Rico are Spanish and English, with Spanish being the primary language. Spanish is, and has been, the only official language of the entire Commonwealth judiciary system, even despite a 1902 English-only language law. All official business of the U.S. District Court for the District of Puerto Rico, however, is conducted in English.

=== Population at large ===
Spanish and English are the two official (i.e., governmental) languages in Puerto Rico. Spanish is the dominant language of business, education and daily life on the island, spoken by over 95% of the population. That is, Spanish predominates as the national language. Regardless of the status of English as an official language or not, Spanish continues to be by far the most widely spoken and written language by the Puerto Rican people at large, and the vast majority of Puerto Ricans do not use English regularly other than some loaned English words during their ordinary Spanish-language speech. Various surveys have found that the majority of Puerto Ricans are not fluent in English. Out of those age five and older, 76.6% of Puerto Rico did not speak English "very well", and 94.5% spoke a language other than English at home.

According to a study done before 2009 by the University of Puerto Rico, nine of every ten Puerto Ricans residing in Puerto Rico do not speak English at an advanced level. More recently, according to the 2005–2009 Population and Housing Narrative Profile for Puerto Rico, among people at least five years old living in Puerto Rico in 2005–2009, 95 percent spoke a language other than English at home. Of those speaking a language using English at home, 5.5 percent spoke Spanish and more than 99.5 percent spoke the other language; 99 percent reported that they did speak English "very well." The 2000 U.S. census had reported that 71.9% of Puerto Rico residents spoke English less than "very well".

=== Education and schooling ===
Public school instruction in Puerto Rico is conducted entirely in Spanish. In 2012, however, there were pilot programs in about a dozen of over 1,400 public schools aimed at conducting instruction in English only. English is taught as a second language and is a compulsory subject from elementary levels to high school. In 2012, pro-U.S. statehood Governor Luis Fortuño proposed that all courses in Puerto Rico public schools be taught in English instead of Spanish as they currently are. The proposal met with stiff opposition from the Puerto Rico Teachers Association while others, including former Education Secretary Gloria Baquero, were pessimistic about the success of the governor's plan overall for reasons that ranged from historical to cultural to political.

== Linguistic influences ==
=== English on Spanish ===
Because of the island's current relationship with the U.S., English has a substantial presence and is seen in various media outlets including newspapers, magazines, cable TV, radio stations, and commercial signs. As a result of this exposure, Puerto Ricans often mix elements of the English language into their own Spanish language, developing new linguistic forms. This kind of incorporation of English into Puerto Rican Spanish is called anglicism, and three prominent forms of anglicism present in Puerto Rico are total linguistic borrowing, semantic borrowing, and syntactical borrowing.

Total linguistic borrowing occurs when an English word is used in Spanish with more or less the same pronunciation. A few examples in which the complete English word has been borrowed are: flash light, Girl Scout, and weekend. The standard Spanish words for these are linterna, exploradora, and fin de semana, respectively. Examples in which the English words or terms are used while pronounced according to the native rules are seen for the English word/term to park, where it is said and pronounced as parquear, instead of the South American/Caribbean-Spanish word for to park which is estacionar. Other examples of this are the English word pamphlet, said as panfleto instead of folleto, and the English word muffler, said as mofle instead of silenciador.

In semantic borrowing, the meaning of a Spanish word is altered or changed because of its similarity to an English word. For example, the Spanish word romance refers to a poetic literary composition, however, it has been given the English meaning of the English word romance. The Spanish word for romance is actually idilio. Another example of this is the Spanish word bloques, which means "building blocks", but is given the English meaning of "street blocks". The actual South American/Caribbean-Spanish word that means "street blocks" is cuadras.

In syntactical borrowing, Spanish words are used in an English sentence structure. For example, most Spanish dialects are pro-drop, meaning personal pronoun subjects are frequently omitted. Puerto Rican Spanish tends to use pronouns: "I run" is often said as "yo corro" instead of as "corro". Another example: "He has cordially invited his friend" is often said as "Él ha cordialmente invitado a su amigo" instead of "Él ha invitado cordialmente a su amigo" or "Ha invitado cordialmente a su amigo."

American English has phonologically influenced rhotics in Puerto Rican Spanish, wherein syllable-final /r/ can be realized as [ɹ], aside from [ɾ], [r], and [l]. For example, "verso"' (verse) becomes [ˈbeɹso], aside from [ˈbeɾso], [ˈberso], or [ˈbelso], "invierno" (winter) becomes [imˈbjeɹno], aside from [imˈbjeɾno], [imˈbjerno], or [imˈbjelno], and "parlamento" (parliament) becomes [paɹlaˈmento], aside from [paɾlaˈmento], [parlaˈmento], or [palaˈmento]. In word-final position, /r/ is usually:

- a trill, a tap, an approximant, [l], or elided when followed by a consonant or a pause, as in amo[r ~ ɾ ~ ɹ ~ l ~ ∅] paterno ('paternal love');
- a tap, an approximant, or [l] when followed by a vowel-initial word, as in amo[ɾ~ ɹ ~ l] eterno ('eternal love').

== Cultural issues ==
=== 2012 Republican primary ===
In 2012, U.S. presidential candidate Rick Santorum caused a firestorm during the runup to the Puerto Rican Republican primary by stating that if Puerto Rico opted to become a state, it would have to make English its primary language. As the New York Times reported:

His remarks drew immediate criticism, and prompted one delegate who had been pledged to him to quit, saying he was offended. There is no rule in the Constitution requiring the adoption of English for the admittance of new states, and the United States does not have an official language. On Thursday Mr. Santorum and his aides scrambled to contain the damage, with the candidate saying several times that the local media had misquoted him as saying he wanted English to be the "only" language, whereas he believed that English should be the "primary language."

Santorum opponent Mitt Romney's campaign issued a statement contrasting his position on the issue with Santorum's. "Puerto Rico currently recognizes both English and Spanish as the official languages of the commonwealth," Romney spokeswoman Andrea Saul said. "Gov. Romney believes that English is the language of opportunity and supports efforts to expand English proficiency in Puerto Rico and across America. However, he would not, as a prerequisite for statehood, require that the people of Puerto Rico cease using Spanish."

== See also ==
- Puerto Rican Spanish
- History of Puerto Rico
- English language
- Caribbean English
- Commonwealth Caribbean
