= University of the West Indies Press =

Academic publishing house

The University of the West Indies Press
- Parent company: University of the West Indies
- Status: Active
- Traded as: UWI Press
- Founded: 1992; 34 years ago
- Country of origin: Jamaica
- Headquarters location: Mona, Saint Andrew Parish
- Distribution: Kingston Bookshop; Sangsters Book Stores; UTP(Canada); Longleaf Services (rest of the Americas); Eurospan Group (Europe, Africa, Middle East, Central Asia)
- Key people: Linda Cameron, Pansy Benn, Linda Speth, Joseph B. Powell, Nadine D. Buckland, Christine Randle
- Publication types: Print books, eBooks, journals and audiobooks
- Nonfiction topics: Caribbean History, Gender Studies, Media Studies, Political Science, Cultural Studies, Biography
- Imprints: UWI Press/Canoe Press
- Official website: www.uwipress.com

The University of the West Indies Press (or UWI Press) is a university press that is part of the University of the West Indies and was founded in 1992. The first book published by the press was Slave Society in the Danish West Indies: St. Thomas, St. John and St. Croix by Neville A. T. Hall. Particularly noted for academic publications with a Caribbean focus, including on history, cultural studies, literature, gender studies, education and political science, the press is currently a member of the Association of University Presses.

West Indies Press publishes The Journal of Caribbean History, a biannual peer-reviewed academic journal covering the history of the Caribbean. The editor-in-chief is Swithin Wilmot of the University of the West Indies.
