= Mennonites in El Salvador =

Mennonitism by country

Mennonites in El Salvador belong to two different groups of Mennonites: the Iglesia Menonita de El Salvador with its center at Metapán in the department of Chalatenango and the Iglesia Evangélica Menonita, which belongs to the Beachy Amish.

El Salvador has the second largest Mennonite population in Central America, after Belize. In 2012, the Iglesia Evangélica Menonita de El Salvador had 13 congregations with 515 members and the Iglesia Evangélica Menonita of the Beachy Amish had 10 congregations with 198 members.
