= Bajan English =

English as spoken in Barbados

Barbadian English
- Bajan English
- Region: Commonwealth Caribbean
- Language family: Indo-European: Germanic; West Germanic; North Sea Germanic; Anglo-Frisian; Anglic; English; Caribbean English; Barbadian English
- Early forms: Proto-Indo-European: Proto-Germanic; Old English; Middle English; Early Modern English
- Writing system: English alphabet

Language codes
- ISO 639-3: –
- IETF: en-BB

Barbadian or Bajan English (/ˈbeɪdʒən/ BAY-jən) is a dialect of the English language as used by Barbadians (Bajans) and by Barbadian diasporas.

== Pronunciation ==
Barbadian English is fully rhotic and full of glottal stops. One example of Barbadian English would be the pronunciation of departments, which is [dɪˈpaːɹʔmənʔs]. It is also notable, in comparison with standard American or British English, for the first vowel in price or prize.

- The realization of the KIT vowel /ɪ/ in Barbadian English is pretty much the same as in American English, the default [ɪ].
- The DRESS vowel /ɛ/ is [ɛ].
- The TRAP vowel /æ/ is usually [a].
- The LOT vowel /ɒ/ is usually [ɑ] or [ɒ].
- The STRUT vowel /ʌ/ is the same as in the US English, [ʌ].
- The FOOT vowel /ʊ/ is [ʊ].
- The FLEECE vowel /iː/ is [iː]. HAPPY is best identified as an allophone of this phoneme, thus /ˈhapiː/.
- The FACE diphthong /eɪ/ varies by region and education/class: it manifests in educated speech generally as [eː] or sometimes [eɪ], and in rural and uneducated speech as the vowel [ɛ].
- The PALM vowel /ɑː/ is mostly [aː]. The BATH diaphoneme is mostly to be identified with this vowel (see trap-bath split)
- The THOUGHT vowel /ɔː/ is [ɑː] or [ɒː].
- The GOAT diphthong /oʊ/ is generally [oː] or [oə].
- The NEAR /ɪər/ and SQUARE /ɛər/ sequences are both [eːɹ], resulting in the near-square merger.
- The START sequence /ɑːr/ is [aːɹ].
- The NORTH sequence /ɔːr/ is usually [ɑːɹ] or [ɒːɹ].
- The FORCE sequence /ɔːr/ and the CURE sequence /ʊər/ are both usually [oːɹ].
- The NURSE vowel /ɜːr/ is [ɤ].
- The GOOSE vowel /uː/ is mostly [uː].
- The PRICE diphthong /aɪ/ is generally [ʌɪ].
- The CHOICE diphthong /ɔɪ/ is either [ʌɪ] or [oɪ].
- The MOUTH diphthong /aʊ/ is [ʌʊ].
- The final LETTER vowel /ər/ is [ɤ].
- The final HORSES vowel /ɪ/ is [ɪ].
- The final COMMA vowel /ə/ is [ə].
- The TRAP and LOT vowels are not merged in Barbadian English. However the vowels of LOT, CLOTH, and THOUGHT are generally merged.

== See also ==
- Barbados
