= Bocas del Toro Creole =

Jamaican Patois dialect of Panama

Bocas del Toro Patois
- Panamanian Patois English
- Native to: Panama
- Native speakers: (270,000 cited 2000)
- Language family: English creole: Atlantic; Western; Jamaican Patois; Bocas del Toro Patois

Language codes
- ISO 639-3: –
- Linguist List: jam-pan
- Glottolog: None
- IETF: jam-PA

Bocas del Toro Patois, or Panamanian Patois English, is a dialect of Jamaican Patois, an English-based creole, spoken in Bocas del Toro Province, Panama. It is similar to Central American varieties such as Limonese Creole. It does not have the status of an official language. It was pejoratively known as "guari-guari."

== See also ==
- Jamaican Patois
- Bajan Creole
- English-based creoles
