= Jamaican English =

Variety of the English language used in Jamaica

Speech example
An example of a woman and man with Jamaican English accents.

Jamaican English, including Jamaican Standard English, is the variety of English native to Jamaica and is the official language of the country. A distinction exists between Jamaican English and Jamaican Patois (a creole language), though not entirely a sharp distinction so much as a gradual continuum between two extremes. Jamaican English tends to follow British English spelling conventions.

== Sociolinguistics ==
There are several language varieties that have significantly impacted the Jamaican dialect of English. English was introduced into Jamaica in 1655, because of British colonisation. British English was spread through post-primary education, and through British teachers that immigrated to Jamaica. Standard English in Jamaica conflated with the British standard. Individuals who speak the standard variety are often considered to be of a higher social class; the people who speak more standard English than patois are known as “uptown”. Also, American English has contributed to the Jamaican English dialect. These impacts can be traced to the development of stronger social and economic ties with the United States, the popularity of U.S. cultural offerings, including film, music, and televised dramas and comedies and tourism. Jamaican Patois is another source of influence on Jamaican English. Many rural homes are monolingually Patois.

== Grammar ==
There are great similarities between standard British English and the standard variety of Jamaican English, including in grammar, idiom, and vocabulary.

== Phonology ==
Features of standard Jamaican English include the characteristic pronunciation of the /aʊ/ diphthong in words like MOUTH, which is often more closed and rounded [ɵʊ] than in British Received Pronunciation (RP) or General American (GA); the pronunciation of the STRUT vowel /ʌ/ to [ɵ~o] (again, more closed and rounded than the RP or GA varieties); and the very distinctive feature of "variable semi-rhoticity". Non-rhoticity (the pronunciation of "r" nowhere except before vowels) is highly variable in Jamaican English and can depend upon the phonemic and even social context. Jamaican English accents are: non-rhotic regarding words of the LETTER lexical set (at the ends of unstressed syllables); rhotic (i.e., fully preserving the "r" sound) regarding words of the NEAR and FORCE sets; high to middling in degrees of rhoticity regarding the SQUARE, NURSE, and CURE sets; and low regarding rhoticity with most other word sets. When "r" is followed by a consonant, non-rhoticity is more likely than when "r" is not followed by a consonant. However, overall more rhoticity is positively correlated with higher levels of education. This has been attributed to the Jamaican education system normalising and promoting a rhotic variety of English. Thus, the overall degree of rhoticity in educated Jamaican English remains low, with rhoticity occurring 21.7% of the time.

Merger of the diphthongs in "fair" and "fear" takes place both in Jamaican Standard English and Jamaican Patois, resulting in those two words (and a number of others, like "bear" and "beer") often becoming homophones: the sound being [eːɹ], though often [iɛɹ] (something like "ee-air"; thus "bear/beer" as "bee-air").

The short "a" sound (TRAP, MAN, HAT, etc.) is very open [a], similar to its Irish variants, while BATH, PALM, and START all use this same sound too, but lengthened, and perhaps slightly backed; this distinction can maintain a London-like TRAP–BATH split. Both LOT/CLOTH and THOUGHT use a rounded [ɔ], though a cot-caught merger is theoretically avoided by the latter set of words being more lengthened; however, in reality, a full merger (of LOT/CLOTH/THOUGHT) is reportedly increasing in informal contexts. For Jamaican Patois speakers, the merged vowel is much lower. GOAT and FACE vowels in the standard educated dialect are long monophthongs: respectively [oː] and [eː]. The unstressed schwa phoneme (COMMA) appears to be normally produced in the area of [a~ɐ].

Before the low central vowel [a], the velars [k] and [ɡ] can be realized with palatalisation, so that cat can be pronounced [kʰat ~ kjat] and card as [kʰaːd ~ kjaːd]); while [ɡ] and [ɡj] coexist, as in gap [ɡʱap ~ ɡjap] or guard [ɡʱaː(ɹ)d ~ ɡjaː(ɹ)d]. These variations are distinct phonemes in Jamaican Patois before [a]: [ɡjaːdn̩] is garden while [ɡaːdn̩] is Gordon; [kjaːf] is calf while [kaːf] is cough. They are not distinct phonemes in Jamaica English because these word pairs are distinguished by the vowel ([a] vs [ɔ]) instead. However, this fact hasn't stopped educated speakers from incorporating [kj] in their English at least before unlengthened "a". However, vowel length can be a relevant factor, since it is possible to hear forms like [kjat] for cat, [kjaɹɪ] for carry, [kjaɹaktʌ] for character, and [kjaɹɪbiǝn] for Caribbean, but affluent or aspiring middle-class speakers tend to avoid [kjaːɹ] for car due to its longer vowel.

Presumably less-educated Jamaican Patois speakers may speak English with several other notable features, including a TRAP–LOT merger (e.g. with rat and rot homophones) to [ɔ] and a PRIZE–CHOICE merger (e.g. with line and loin homophones) to [ɔi]. Th-stopping is also common.

One of the most salient sounds of Caribbean English to speakers of outside English dialects is its unique rhythm and intonation. Linguists debate whether this system centres mostly on stress, tone, or a mixture in which the two interact. Sometimes, Jamaican English is perceived as maintaining less of a contrast between stressed and unstressed syllables, in other words, making all syllables sound relatively-equally stressed: thus kitchen not /ˈkɪtʃɪn/ so much as /kɪtʃɪn/ (perhaps even perceived by a non-Caribbean as having second-syllable stress: /kɪˈtʃɪn/). In Jamaican English, normally reduced English vowels are sometimes not reduced, and other times are hyper-reduced, so that token is not *[ˈtuokn̩] but [ˈtuoken], yet cement can be as reduced as [sment]; the exact nuances of the rules at play here are also highly debated.

== Language use: Jamaican Standard English versus Patois ==
Jamaican Standard English and Jamaican Patois exist together in a post-creole speech continuum. Jamaican (Creole/Patois) is used by most people for everyday, informal situations; it is the language most Jamaicans use at home and are most familiar with, as well as the language of most local popular music. Jamaican Patois has begun to be used on the radio as well as the news. Standard English, on the other hand, is the language of education, high culture, government, the media and official/formal communications. It is also the native language of a small minority of Jamaicans (typically upper-class and upper/traditional middle-class). Most Creole-dominant speakers have a fair command of English and Standard English, through schooling and exposure to official culture and mass media; their receptive skills (understanding of Standard English) are typically much better than their productive skills (their own intended Standard English statements often show signs of Jamaican Creole influence).

Most writing in Jamaica is done in English (including private notes and correspondence). Jamaican Patois has a standardised orthography as well, but has only recently been taught in some schools, so the majority of Jamaicans can read and write standard English only, and have trouble deciphering written Patois (in which the writer tries to reflect characteristic structures and pronunciations to differing degrees, without compromising readability). Written Patois appears mostly in literature, especially in folkloristic "dialect poems"; in humoristic newspaper columns; and most recently, on internet chat sites frequented by younger Jamaicans, who seem to have a more positive attitude toward their own language use than their parents.

While, for the sake of simplicity, it is customary to describe Jamaican speech in terms of standard English versus Jamaican Creole, a clear-cut dichotomy does not describe the actual language use of most Jamaicans. Between the two extremes—"broad Patois" on one end of the spectrum, and "perfect" Standard English on the other—there are various in-between varieties. This situation typically results when a Creole language is in constant contact with Standardised English (superstrate or lexifier language) and is called a creole speech continuum. The least prestigious (most Creole) variety is called the basilect; Standard English (or high prestige) variety, the acrolect; and in-between versions are known as mesolects.

Consider, for example, the following forms:

- "im/(h)ihn de/da/a wok úoba désò" (basilect)
- "im workin ova deso" (low mesolect)
- "(H)e (h)is workin' over dere" (high mesolect)
- "He is working over there." (acrolect)

(As noted above, the "r" in "over" is not pronounced in any variety, but the one in "dere" or "there" is.)

Jamaicans choose from the varieties available to them according to the situation. A Creole-dominant speaker may choose a higher variety for formal occasions like official business or a wedding speech, and a lower one for relating to friends; a standard English-dominant speaker is likely to employ a lower variety when shopping at the market than at their workplace. Code-switching can also be metacommunicative (as when a Standard-dominant speaker switches to a more heavily basilect-influenced variety in an attempt at humor or to express solidarity).

== See also ==
- Regional accents of English speakers
- Nation language
