= Afro-Caribbean peoples =

Caribbean people with Sub-Saharan African ancestry

Afro-Caribbean people
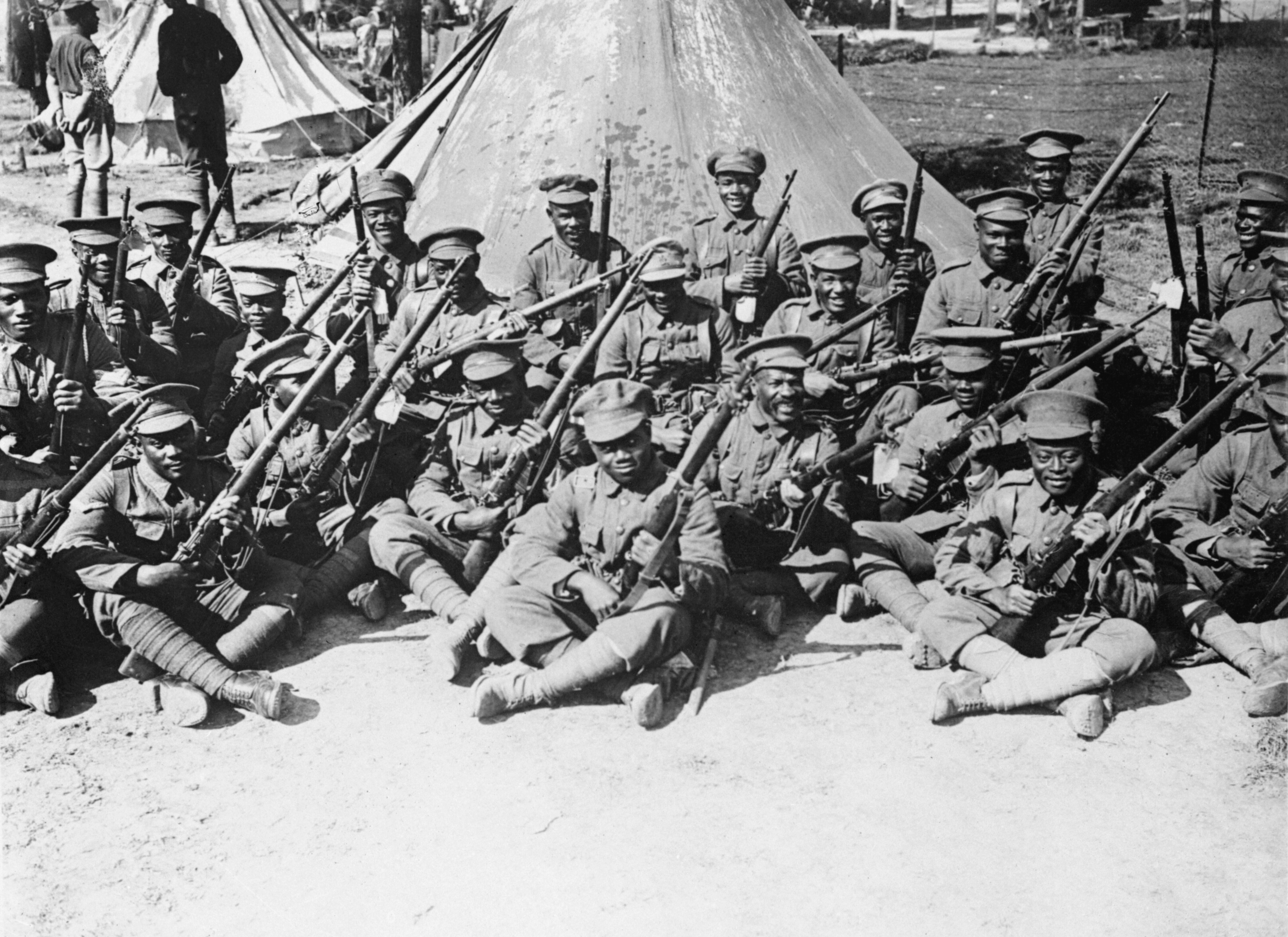
- Afro-Caribbean volunteer soldiers of the West Indies Regiment Q 1916.

Total population
- c. 23.6 million (2025 est.)

Regions with significant populations
- Haiti: 8.9 million
- United States: 2.88 million
- Jamaica: 2 million
- Dominican Republic: 2 million
- France: 1.2 million
- Cuba: 1.03 million
- United Kingdom: 1.0 million
- Trinidad and Tobago: 452,536
- Canada: 383,533
- Bahamas: 372,000
- Puerto Rico: 342,000
- Martinique: 273,985
- Barbados: 253,771
- Guyana: 225,860
- Suriname: 202,500
- Saint Lucia: 173,765
- Curaçao: 148,000
- Grenada: 101,309
- Saint Vincent and the Grenadines: 98,693
- Belize: 93,394
- Antigua and Barbuda: 106,365
- U.S. Virgin Islands: 80,868
- Dominica: 72,660
- Honduras: 51,000 (approx) in Bay Islands Department
- Saint Kitts and Nevis: 38,827
- Cayman Islands: 18,837
- Aruba: 15,000 (approx)
- Montserrat: 4,389

Languages
- Dutch; Surinamese Dutch; Standard English; Bahamian • Barbadian • Bay Islands • Belizean • Bermudian • Cayman Islands • Jamaican Standard • Puerto Rican • Samaná • Trinidadian and Tobagonian; English Creole; Aluku • Antiguan and Barbudan • Bahamian • Bajan • Belizean • Bocas del Toro • Grenadian • Guyanese • Jamaican • Kromanti • Kwinti • Limonese • Matawai • Miskito Coast • Montserrat • Okanisi • Paamaka • Rama Cay • Saint Kitts • San Andrés–Providencia • Sranan Tongo • Tobagonian • Trinidadian • Turks and Caicos • Vincentian • Virgin Islands; French; French Creole; Antillean • Dominican • Grenadian • Guadeloupean • Haitian • Martinican • Saint Lucian • San Miguel • Trinidadian; Garifuna language Papiamento; Saamáka; Spanish; Dominican Spanish • Puerto Rican Spanish • Cuban Spanish

Religion
- Majority: Christianity (Catholicism • Protestantism); Minority: Rastafari • Islam • African diaspora religions • Haitian Vodou • Obeah • Santería • Spiritual Baptists • Orisha-Shango • Vodunu-Rada • Bahá’í • Judaism • Sathya Sai Baba movement

Related ethnic groups
- Afro-Colombians • Afro-Venezuelans • African-Americans • Belizean Creoles • Garínagu • Maroons

Afro-Caribbean or African Caribbean people or Afro-West Indians are Caribbean people who trace their full or partial ancestry to Africa. The majority of the modern Afro-Caribbean people descend from the West and Central Africans taken as slaves to the colonial Caribbean via the trans-Atlantic slave trade between the 15th and 19th centuries to work primarily on various sugar plantations and in domestic households. Other names for the ethnic group include Black Caribbean, Afro- or Black West Indian, or Afro- or Black Antillean or Afwo-Karayiben (Haitian Creole). The term West Indian Creole has also been used to refer to Afro-Caribbean people, as well as other ethnic and racial groups in the region, though there remains debate about its use to refer to Afro-Caribbean people specifically. The term Afro-Caribbean was not coined by Caribbean people themselves but was first used by European Americans in the late 1960s.

People of Afro-Caribbean descent today are largely of West African and Central African ancestry, and may additionally be of other origins, including European, Chinese, South Asian, Jewish and Amerindian descent, as there has been extensive intermarriage and unions among the peoples of the Caribbean over the centuries.

Although most Afro-Caribbean people today continue to reside in English, French, Dutch, and Spanish-speaking Caribbean nations and territories, there are also significant diaspora populations throughout the Western world, especially in the United States, Canada, United Kingdom, France and the Netherlands. Caribbean peoples are predominantly of Christian faith, though some practice African-derived or syncretic religions, such as Santeria, Vodou and Winti. Many speak creole languages, such as Haitian Creole, Jamaican Patois, Sranantongo, Saint Lucian Creole, Martinican Creole or Papiamento.

Both the home and diaspora populations have produced a number of individuals who have had a notable influence on modern African, Caribbean and Western societies; they include political activists such as Marcus Garvey and C. L. R. James; writers and theorists such as Aimé Césaire and Frantz Fanon; US vice president and senator Kamala Harris; US military leader and statesman Colin Powell; athletes such as Usain Bolt, Tim Duncan and David Ortiz; and musicians Bob Marley, Nicki Minaj, Harry Belafonte, Wyclef Jean, Rihanna, and the actor and musician Jacob Anderson.

== History ==
=== 16th–18th centuries ===
During the post-Columbian era, the archipelagos and islands of the Caribbean were the first sites of African diaspora dispersal in the western Atlantic.

In the early 16th century, more Africans began to enter the population of the Spanish Caribbean colonies, sometimes arriving as free men of mixed ancestry or as indentured servants, but increasingly as enslaved workers and servants. This increasing demand for African labour in the Caribbean was in part the result of the massive depopulation of the native Taíno and other Indigenous peoples caused by the new infectious diseases, harsh conditions, and warfare brought by European colonists. By the mid-16th century, the slave trade from West Africa to the Caribbean was so profitable that Francis Drake and John Hawkins were prepared to engage in piracy as well as break Spanish colonial laws, in order to forcibly transport approximately 1500 enslaved people from Sierra Leone to Hispaniola (modern-day Haiti and the Dominican Republic).

During the 17th and 18th centuries, European colonial development in the Caribbean became increasingly reliant on plantation slavery to cultivate and process the lucrative commodity crop of sugarcane. On many islands shortly before the end of the 18th century, the enslaved Afro-Caribbean people greatly outnumbered their European masters. In addition, there developed a class of free people of color, especially in the French islands, where certain individuals of mixed race were given rights. On Saint-Domingue, free people of color and slaves rebelled against harsh conditions, and constant inter-imperial warfare. Inspired by French revolutionary sentiments which pronounced all men free and equal, Toussaint L'Ouverture and Jean Jacques Dessalines led the Haitian Revolution. When it became independent in 1804, Haiti became the first Afro-Caribbean republic in the Western Hemisphere and the first state which was both free from slavery (though not from forced labour) and ruled by non-whites and former captives.

=== 19th–20th centuries ===
In 1804, Haiti, with its overwhelmingly African population and leadership, became the second nation in the Americas to win independence from a European state. During the 19th century, continuous waves of rebellion, such as the Baptist War, led by Sam Sharpe in Jamaica, created the conditions for the incremental abolition of slavery in the region by various colonial powers. Great Britain abolished slavery in its holdings in 1834. Cuba was the last island to be emancipated, when Spain abolished slavery in its colonies.

During the 20th century, Afro-Caribbean people, who were a majority in many Caribbean societies, began to assert their cultural, economic, and political rights with more vigor on the world stage. Marcus Garvey was among many influential immigrants to the United States from Jamaica, expanding his UNIA movement in New York City and the U.S. Afro-Caribbean people, such as Claude McKay and Eric D. Walrond, were influential in the Harlem Renaissance as artists and writers. Aimé Césaire developed a négritude movement.

In the 1960s, the West Indian territories were given their political independence from British colonial rule. They were pre-eminent in creating new cultural forms such as reggae music, calypso and Rastafari within the Caribbean. Beyond the region, a developing Afro-Caribbean diaspora in the United States, including such figures as Stokely Carmichael and DJ Kool Herc, was influential in the development of the Black Power movement of the 1960s and the hip-hop movement of the 1980s. African-Caribbean individuals also contributed to cultural developments in Europe, as evidenced by influential theorists such as Frantz Fanon and Stuart Hall.

=== African Origins ===
Afro-Caribbeans descend from a variety of African ethnic groups, who were forcibly brought to the Caribbean during the Trans-Atlantic Slave Trade. Certain ethnic groups were more prominent in specific regions of the Caribbeans due to the different European powers having a stronger outpost in specific regions of the West Africa.

Of the 40 distinct ethnic groups brought to the Caribbean, the most prevalent were the Igbo, Yoruba, Mande, Gbe, Akan, Bakongo, Mbundu, Wolof, and Fulani, among others.

The Igbo from the Bight of Biafra and the Akan of the Gold Coast were commonly found in the British West Indies, whereas the Akan were also prevalent in the Dutch Caribbean. Groups from Central Africa, like the Bakongo and Mbundu, were prevalent in the Spanish West Indies. However, the Bakongo were also common in the French West Indies due to the slave post at Loango being dominated by both the Spanish and the French.

The Yoruba from the Bight of Benin were more common in the Spanish West Indies as most Yoruba slaves were trafficked in the 18th and 19th century, following the collapse of Oyo and Spain's illegal involvement in the slave trade after the British abolition in 1807. The Gbe from the Bight of Benin were more prevalent in the French West Indies, along with the Dutch Caribbean.

With the Treaty of Utrecht (1713), Britain was permitted to supply African slaves to the Spanish colonies. This caused enslaved ethnicities, like the Igbo, to appear in Cuba and other Spanish colonies. Groups from Senegambia like Mande, Wolof, and Fulani were more prevalent in the Spanish West Indies in the early periods of the Atlantic Slave Trade.

== Notable people ==
=== Politics ===
- Sir Grantley Adams – Barbados, politician and lawyer; the first and only Prime Minister of the West Indies Federation (1958–1962)
- Marcos Evangelista Adón – Dominican Republic, politician and freedom fighter
- Jean-Bertrand Aristide – politician, priest and head of state, Haiti
- Dean Barrow – head of government, Belize
- Maurice Bishop – Grenada, revolutionary leader
- Paul Bogle – Jamaica, political activist
- Ertha Pascal Trouillot – Haiti, first Black female president in the world, lawyer
- Juan Almeida Bosque – Cuban revolutionary and politician
- Dutty Boukman – Haitian freedom fighter
- Forbes Burnham – Guyana, head of government
- Bussa – Barbados, freedom fighter
- Stokely Carmichael – Trinidad-born, civil rights activist and leader in the US
- Mary Eugenia Charles – Dominican head of government
- Perry Christie – Bahamian, politician and lawyer
- Henri Christophe – Haiti, revolutionary, general and head of state
- David Clarke (sheriff) – Barbudan, former Sheriff of Milwaukee
- John Compton – Saint Lucia, politician and lawyer
- Paris Dennard – Grenada, former CNN political commentator
- Jean-Jacques Dessalines – Haiti (est. 1804), revolutionary, general and first head of state of independent Haiti
- Papa Doc Duvalier – dictator of Haiti, 20th century
- Marcus Garvey – Jamaica, politician and writer, founder of UNIA and active in US politics from 1916 to 1927
- Philip Goldson – Belize, politician
- Kamala Devi Harris – Jamaican descent, first African American, first Asian American, and first female Vice President of the United States
- Louis Farrakhan – Jamaican and St. Kitts ancestry. Religious leader, Head of Nation of Islam, USA
- Ulises Heureaux – Dominican Republic president and military leader
- Sam Hinds – Guyana, head of government
- Hubert Ingraham – Bahamian, politician and lawyer
- Toussaint L'Ouverture – Haiti, revolutionary, general and governor
- Joseph Robert Love – Bahamian-born, medical doctor; Jamaican politician and political activist who influenced Marcus Garvey
- Gregorio Luperón – Dominican Republic, revolutionary, general and president
- Antonio Maceo Grajales – Cuban revolutionary and general
- Michael Manley – Jamaica, politician
- Jon Miller – Montserrat, Conservative Review, BlazeTV Host
- Nanny of the Maroons – Jamaica, freedom fighter
- Jeanne Odo – Haiti, abolitionist
- Candace Owens – British Virgin Islander, PragerU Radio and Founder of Blexit
- Wendy Phipps (born 1967) is a Kittitian politician and businesswoman.
- Lynden Pindling – Bahamian politician, and first Prime minister of the Bahamas
- José Joaquín Puello – Dominican Republic revolutionary, government minister and activist
- Samuel Jackman Prescod – Barbados, first elected Afro-Caribbean politician in the House of Assembly
- Francisco del Rosario Sánchez – Dominican Republic, revolutionary and politician
- Sam Sharpe – Jamaica, freedom fighter
- Solitude – Guadeloupe, freedom fighter
- Eric Eustace Williams – Trinidad and Tobago politician, writer and head of government
- Shirley Chisholm – Guyanese and Bajan descent, first black woman elected to the US Congress, first black major-party US presidential candidate
- Colin Powell – Jamaican descent, US Army General, Chairman Joint Chiefs of Staff

=== Science and philosophy ===
- Alfredo Bowman (Dr. Sebi) – International herbalist healer from Honduras.
- Frantz Fanon – Martinique, writer, psychiatrist and freedom fighter
- Hubert Harrison – St. Croix, writer, orator, educator, critic, and race and class conscious political activist based in Harlem, New York
- Stuart Hall – Jamaican philosopher
- C. L. R. James – Trinidad and Tobago, activist and writer
- W. Arthur Lewis – Saint Lucia, economist and Nobel Prize recipient
- Olivorio Mateo – Dominican Republic, spiritual healer and revolutionary
- Pedro Alonso Niño – Afro-Spanish explorer
- Arlie Petters – Belizean mathematician
- Walter Rodney – Guyanese activist and writer
- Mary Seacole – Jamaican nurse and hospital director

=== Arts and culture ===
- Oscar Abrams - Guyanese architect, community activist, co-founder of the Keskidee Centre in London, U.K.
- Carlos Acosta – Cuba, ballet dancer
- Joseph Marcell - Saint Lucian, actor best known for butler role in Fresh Prince of Bel Air
- Kassav' - Guadeloupe, French Caribbean Band known for zouk music
- Celsa Albert Batista, Dominican Republic, author and historian
- Beenie Man – Jamaica, artist and musician
- Frank Bowling – Guyana, painter
- Esther Rolle – Actress of Bahamian descent
- Cándido Camero - Cuba, percussionist
- Aimé Césaire – Martinique, fiction writer
- Jimmy Cliff - Jamaica, musician
- Celia Cruz – Cuba, singer
- Tego Calderon – Puerto Rican, rapper
- Stacey Dash – Barbadian descent, actress
- AngelaMaria Davila – Puerto Rican poet
- Eddy Grant – Guyana, singer and musician
- Stuart Hall - Jamaican-British cultural theorist, activist,
- Edward W. Hardy – Puerto Rican, composer and musician
- C. L. R. James – Trinidad, historian, essayist and journalist
- Wyclef Jean – Haitian singer, composer and activist
- Earl Lovelace – Trinidad, novelist and writer
- Luis Palés Matos – Puerto Rican poet
- Bob Marley – Jamaica, singer and musician
- Ziggy Marley (Bob Marley's son) – Jamaica, singer and musician
- Myke Towers – Puerto Rican, rapper
- The Mighty Sparrow – Grenadian/Trinidadian singer and composer
- Trinidad James – Trinidad, rapper
- Zoe Saldaña – American actress of Dominican and Puerto Rican descent
- Nicki Minaj – Trinidad, rapper and singer
- Sean Paul – Jamaica, dancehall artist
- Don Omar – Puerto Rican, rapper and singer
- Olivia Peguero – Dominican Republic, painter
- Shyne – Belize rapper
- Sidney Poitier – Bahamas, first Black actor to win an Academy Award in the US
- Rihanna – Barbados, singer
- Chevalier de Saint-Georges – Guadeloupe, composer
- Cardi B - Dominican Republic, rapper
- Romeo Santos – Puerto Rican and Dominican bachata singer
- Naomi Campbell - Jamaican-English supermodel.
- Lewis Hamilton - Grenadian, Formula 1 driver.
- FKA Twigs - Jamaican, alternative singer.
- Antony Santos – Dominican Republic, bachata singer
- Peter Tosh – Jamaica, singer and musician
- Bebo Valdés – Cuban musician
- Johnny Ventura – Dominican Republic salsa and merengue singer
- Corinne Bailey Rae – singer of Kittian descent
- Derek Walcott – Saint Lucia, poet, recipient of the Nobel Prize for Literature
- Pop Smoke – American rapper of Jamaican and Panamanian descent
- Bert Williams – Bahamian entertainer, and probably the first successful Afro-Caribbean entertainer in America

=== Sports ===
- Julian Alfred - Saint Lucia, Olympic Gold Medalist in 100 metres event in 2024
- Cole Palmer – English footballer, Chelsea player
- Kirani James – Grenada, Grenada's first Olympic Gold Medalist and World's fastest 400m runner from 2012 to 2016
- Omar Amir-Bahamas – professional wrestler in the Ohio Valley Wrestling Arena
- Deandre Ayton – Bahamas, #1 Overall Pick of the 2018 NBA Draft and player for the Phoenix Suns
- Felix “Tito” Trinidad - Puerto Rican professional boxer
- Ozzie Albies – Curaçao, MLB player for the Atlanta Braves
- John Barnes – Jamaican-born English footballer
- Usain Bolt – Jamaica, Olympics gold medalist and the fastest man in history
- Robinson Canó – Dominican Republic MLB player
- Kingsley Coman – Guadeloupe, football player
- Carmelo Anthony – Puerto Rican-American, basketball player
- Tonique Williams-Darling – Bahamas, 400m runner and Olympic gold medalist
- Tim Duncan – St. Croix (Anguilla parentage), basketball player
- Shelly-Ann Fraser-Pryce – Jamaica, athlete
- Thierry Henry – Guadeloupe, football player, best French scorer
- Buddy Hield – Bahamas, NBA player for the Sacramento Kings
- Kenley Jansen – Curaçao, MLB player for the Los Angeles Dodgers
- Brian Lara – Trinidad, cricketer
- Anthony Martial – Guadeloupe, French football player
- Pedro Martínez – Dominican Republic MLB player
- Shaunae Miller – Bahamian, 400m and 200m runner and Olympic gold medalist
- Anthony Nesty – Surinamese, swimmer and Olympic gold medalist
- David Ortiz – Dominican Republic MLB player
- Burgess Owens – Barbadian-born, former American football player
- Sir Vivian Richards – Antigua, cricketer
- Teddy Riner – Guadeloupe, Judoka
- Errol Spence Jr. – Jamaican American, boxer, current Unified Welterweight Champion
- Mike McCallum – Jamaica, Boxer, World Champion in 3 different weight classes
- Julian Jackson (boxer) – Saint Thomas, boxer, 3-time world champion in 2 weight classes
- Darren Sammy – Saint Lucia, cricketer
- Kimbo Slice – Bahamian boxer and MMA fighter
- Sir Garfield Sobers – Barbados, cricketer
- Sammy Sosa – Dominican Republic MLB player
- Karl-Anthony Towns – Dominican Republic-descended NBA player, #1 overall pick in the 2015 NBA draft, NBA player for the Minnesota Timberwolves
- Marcellus Wiley – Martinican American, former American football player and FOX Sports commentator/host
- Adam Sanford – Dominican cricketer
- Jayde Riviere – Dominican football Player
- Jay Emmanuel-Thomas – Dominican football player
- Konrad de la Fuente – Dominican-American football player
- Vurnon Anita – Curaçao football player
- Joe Willock – Jamaican football player
- Fabrice Noel – Haitian footballer
- Jaron Vicario – Curaçaoan football player
- Sanchez Watt – Jamaican football player
- Jobe Bellingham -- Jamaica, football player
- Jude Bellingham -- Jamaica, football player

== Main groups ==
- Afro–Antiguans and Barbudans
- Afro-Anguillians
- Afro-Arubans
- Afro-Bahamians
- Afro-Barbadians
- Afro-Bermudians
- Afro-Curaçaoans
- Afro-Colombians
- Afro–Costa Ricans
- Afro-Cubans
- Afro-Dominicans
- Afro-Dominicans (Dominican Republic)
- Afro-Grenadians
- Afro-Guatemalans
- Afro-Guyanese
- Afro-Haitians
- Afro-Hondurans
- Afro-Jamaicans
- Afro–Kittitians and Nevisians
- Afro-Martinicans
- Afro-Mexicans
- Afro-Nicaraguans
- Afro-Panamanians
- Afro–Puerto Ricans
- Afro–Saint Lucians
- Afro-Salvadorans
- Afro-Surinamese
- Afro–Trinidadians and Tobagonians
- Afro–Turks and Caicos Islanders
- Afro-Venezuelans
- Afro-Vincentians
- Afro–Virgin Islanders
- Belizean Creole people
- Samaná Americans
- Other members of the African diaspora in or from the Caribbean

== Genetic ancestry ==
Average proportions of African, West Eurasian (European and MENA), Native American and Asian admixtures in Caribbean countries and dependencies:

Population estimates, as of 1 July 2023
Country	Population	African %	West Eurasian %	Native American %	Asian %	Source (study)	Sample size
Bahamas	413,000	74.4%	17.3%	8.3%	0.0%	Simms et al. 2012	756
Barbados	282,000	88.0%	11.0%	1.0%	0.0%	Montinaro et al. 2015	75
Cuba	11,020,000	21.0%	71.0%	8.0%	0.0%	Fortes-Lima et al. 2018	860
Dominica	72,000	56.0%	28.0%	16.0%	0.0%	Torres et al. 2013	37
Dominican Republic	11,331,000	38.0%	52.0%	10.0%	0.0%	Mathias et al. 2016	47
Grenada	117,000	81.0%	12.0%	7.0%	0.0%	Torres et al. 2013	48
Haiti	11,637,000	84.0%	15.0%	1%	0.0%	Simms et al. 2010	111
Jamaica	2,840,000	82.0%	10.0%	8.0%	0.0%	Torres et al. 2013	44
Puerto Rico	3,242,000	21.0%	61.0%	18.0%	0.0%	Pérez-Mayoral et al. 2019	831
Saint Kitts and Nevis	51,000	85.9%	8.2%	5.9%	0.0%	Torres et al. 2013	47
Saint Lucia	179,000	75.0%	18.0%	7.0%	0.0%	Torres et al. 2013	50
Saint Vincent and the Grenadines	111,000	81.0%	13.0%	6.0%	0.0%	Torres et al. 2013	51
Trinidad and Tobago	1,503,000	75.0%	15.8%	9.2%	0.0%	Torres et al. 2013	43
U.S. Virgin Islands	86,000	77.4%	16.9%	5.7%	0.0%	Torres et al. 2013	99
Anguilla	16,000	-	-	-	-	-	-
Antigua and Barbuda	101,000	-	-	-	-	-	-
Aruba	108,000	-	-	-	-	-	-
Belize	411,000	-	-	-	-	-	-
Bonaire	25,000	-	-	-	-	-	-
British Virgin Islands	39,000	-	-	-	-	-	-
Cayman Islands	88,000	-	-	-	-	-	-
Curaçao	185,000	-	-	-	-	-	-
Guadeloupe	377,000	-	-	-	-	-	-
Guyana	826,000	-	-	-	-	-	-
Martinique	346,000	-	-	-	-	-	-
Montserrat	4,000	-	-	-	-	-	-
Saba	2,000	-	-	-	-	-	-
Saint Barthelemy	11,000	-	-	-	-	-	-
Saint Martin	31,000	-	-	-	-	-	-
Sint Eustatius	3,000	-	-	-	-	-	-
Sint Maarten	58,000	-	-	-	-	-	-
Suriname	629,000	-	-	-	-	-	-
Turks and Caicos	49,000	-	-	-	-	-	-

== Culture ==
- Afro-Caribbean culture
- Afro-Caribbean music
- Afro-Caribbean religion

== See also ==
- Afro-Latin Americans
- African diaspora in the Americas
