= ZNK-FM =

Adult contemporary radio station in Nassau, Bahamas

- Nassau; Bahamas
- Broadcast area: New Providence, Bahamas
- Frequency: 96.1 MHz
- Branding: KISS fm

Programming
- Language: English
- Format: Adult contemporary

History
- Call sign meaning: ZN (former ITU prefix under United Kingdom rule) Kiss

Technical information
- ERP: 5,000 watts
- Transmitter coordinates: 25°2′44″N 77°19′5″W

Links
- Webcast: http://listen.streamon.fm/kiss96

ZNK-FM is a radio station in Nassau, Bahamas broadcasting an adult contemporary radio format.
