= Demographics of the Bahamas =

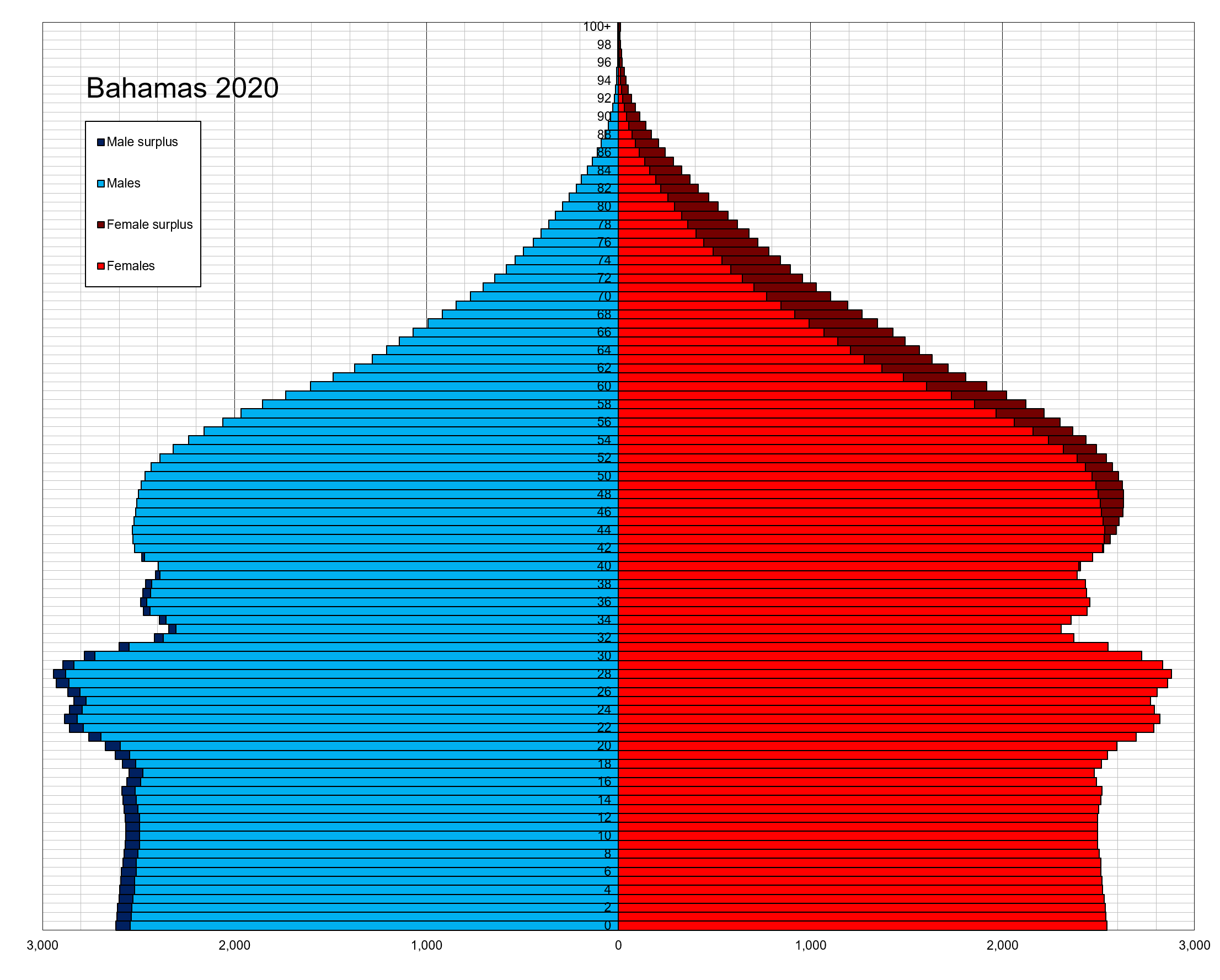
Bahamas population pyramid in 2020

This is a demography of the population of the Bahamas including population density, ethnicity, education level, health of the populace, economic status, religious affiliations and other aspects of the population.

Census population and average annual growth rate
Year	Pop.	±% p.a.
1845	26,491	—
1851	27,519	+0.64%
1861	35,487	+2.58%
1871	39,162	+0.99%
1881	43,521	+1.06%
1891	47,565	+0.89%
1901	53,735	+1.23%
1911	55,944	+0.40%
1921	53,031	−0.53%
1931	59,828	+1.21%
1943	68,846	+1.18%
1953	84,841	+2.11%
1963	130,220	+4.38%
1970	168,812	+3.78%
1980	209,505	+2.18%
1990	255,049	+1.99%
2000	303,611	+1.76%
2010	351,461	+1.47%
2022	399,314	+1.07%

Ninety percent of the Bahamian population identifies as being primarily of African ancestry. About two-thirds of the population lives on New Providence Island (the location of Nassau), and about half of the remaining one-third lives on Grand Bahama (the location of Freeport).

The islands were sparsely settled and a haven for pirates until the late 18th century, when thousands of British Loyalists were given compensatory land grants following the American Revolution. Many new settlers were from the Southern United States and brought slaves with them to cultivate plantations. At the turn of the 20th century, the total population was 53,000.

School attendance is compulsory between the ages of 5 and 16. There are 158 public schools and 52 private schools in the Bahamas catering to more than 66,000 students. The College of the Bahamas, established in Nassau in 1974, provides programmes leading to associate's degrees and bachelor's degrees; the college is now converting from a two-year to a four-year institution.

Demographics of Bahamas, data of FAO, year 2005; number of inhabitants in thousands

== Structure of the population ==
Population Estimates by Sex and Age Group (01.VII.2013) (Because of rounding, totals are not in all cases the sum of the respective components.):

Age group	Male	Female	Total	%
Total	179 850	188 540	368 390	100
0-4	16 670	15 660	32 330	8.78
5-9	16 400	15 090	31 490	8.55
10-14	14 990	14 730	29 720	8.07
15-19	15 170	15 320	30 490	8.28
20-24	14 780	15 250	30 030	8.15
25-29	13 090	13 780	26 870	7.29
30-34	12 780	13 000	25 780	7.00
35-39	13 100	13 720	26 820	7.28
40-44	13 480	14 480	27 960	7.59
45-49	12 890	13 860	26 750	7.26
50-54	11 760	12 570	24 330	6.60
55-59	8 670	9 570	18 240	4.95
60-64	6 030	6 830	12 860	3.49
65-69	4 260	5 080	9 340	2.54
70-74	3 030	3 860	6 890	1.87
75-79	1 800	2 480	4 280	1.16
80-84	586	1 747	2 333	0.63
85-89	243	873	1 116	0.30
90+	121	640	761	0.21
Age group	Male	Female	Total	Percent
0-14	48 060	45 480	93 540	25.39
15-64	121 750	128 380	250 130	67.90
65+	10 040	14 680	24 720	6.71

Population Estimates by Sex and Age Group (01.VII.2019) (Data based on the 2010 Population Census.):

Age group	Male	Female	Total	%
Total	186 480	198 860	385 340	100
0–4	14 910	14 150	29 060	7.54
5–9	14 290	14 070	28 360	7.36
10–14	15 800	16 100	31 900	8.28
15–19	15 860	16 230	32 090	8.33
20–24	15 760	15 890	31 650	8.21
25–29	15 040	14 980	30 020	7.79
30–34	12 960	13 530	26 490	6.87
35–39	12 980	14 410	27 390	7.11
40–44	13 490	14 670	28 160	7.31
45–49	13 630	15 020	28 650	7.43
50–54	11 970	13 170	25 140	6.52
55–59	10 670	12 000	22 670	5.88
60–64	7 370	8 900	16 270	4.22
65-69	4 870	5 950	10 820	2.81
70-74	3 200	4 090	7 290	1.89
75-79	2 020	2 890	4 910	1.27
80+	1 660	2 810	4 470	1.16
Age group	Male	Female	Total	Percent
0–14	45 000	44 320	89 320	23.20
15–64	129 730	138 800	268 530	69.69
65+	11 750	15 740	27 490	7.13

== Vital statistics ==
	Average population	Live births	Deaths	Natural change	Crude birth rate (per 1000)	Crude death rate (per 1000)	Natural change (per 1000)	Crude Migration change (per 1000)	Total fertility rate	Infant mortality rate
1935	64,000	2,000	1,121	879	31.3	17.5	13.7			
1936	66,000	1,902	1,056	846	28.8	16.0	12.8	17,5		
1937	67,000	2,084	914	1,170	31.1	13.6	17.5	-2,6		
1938	67,000	2,020	1,096	924	30.1	16.4	13.8	-13,8		
1939	68,000	2,040	1,066	974	30.0	15.7	14.3	0.4		
1940	70,000	2,185	1,052	1,133	31.2	15.0	16.2	12.4		
1941	71,000	2,312	920	1,392	32.6	13.0	19.6	-5.5		
1942	72,000	2,409	1,011	1,398	33.5	14.0	19.4	-5.5		
1943	70,000	2,502	1,043	1,459	35.7	14.9	20.8	-49.5		
1944	69,000	2,485	1,103	1,382	36.0	16.0	20.0	-34.5		
1945	71,000	2,174	1,326	848	30.6	18.7	11.9	16.3		
1946	73,000	2,208	1,002	1,206	30.2	13.7	16.5	10.9		
1947	74,000	2,415	987	1,428	32.6	13.3	19.3	-5.9		
1948	76,000	2,539	1,029	1,510	33.4	13.5	19.9	6.4		
1949	77,000	2,646	1,052	1,594	34.4	13.7	20.7	-7.7		
1950	79,000	2,532	1,143	1,389	32.1	14.5	17.6	7.7		
1951	80,000	2,739	963	1,776	34.2	12.0	22.2	-9.7		
1952	81,000	2,714	959	1,755	33.5	11.8	21.7	-9.4		
1953	83,000	3,056	903	2,153	36.8	10.9	25.9	-1.8		
1954	86,000	3,410	844	2,566	39.7	9.8	29.8	5,1		
1955	89,000	2,844	857	1,987	32.0	9.6	22.3	11.5		
1956	92,000	3,290	849	2,441	35.8	9.2	26.5	6.1		
1957	96,000	3,126	764	2,362	32.6	8.0	24.6	17.1		
1958	100,000	3,029	1,095	1,934	30.3	11.0	19.3	20.7		
1959	104,000	3,154	1,000	2,154	30.3	9.6	20.7	17.8		
1960	110,000	3,359	805	2,554	30.5	7.3	23.2	31.3		
1961	115,000	3,734	1,024	2,710	32.5	8.9	23.6	19.9		
1962	121,000	3,468	821	2,647	28.7	6.8	21.9	27.7		
1963	127,000	4,584	1,030	3,554	35.8	8.0	27.8	19.4		
1964	134,000	4,805	987	3,818	35.9	7.4	28.5	23.7		
1965	140,000	4,439	1,098	3,341	31.7	7.8	23.9	19		
1966	146,000	4,573	1,067	3,506	31.1	7.3	23.9	17.2		
1967	153,000	4,275	1,212	3,063	27.9	7.9	20.0	25.8		
1968	159,000	4,220	1,023	3,197	26.5	6.4	20.1	17.6		
1969	164,000	4,306	1,097	3,209	26.1	6.6	19.4	11.1		
1970	169,000	4,262	1,054	3,208	25.1	6.2	18.9	10.7		
1971	174,000	5,334	948	4,386	30.7	5.4	25.2	3.5		
1972	178,000	4,745	1,115	3,630	26.7	6.3	20.4	2.1		
1973	181,000	4,419	1,109	3,310	24.3	6.1	18.2	-1.6		
1974	185,000	4,382	1,032	3,350	23.7	5.6	18.1	3.5		
1975	189,000	4,033	1,106	2,927	21.3	5.9	15.5	5.7		
1976	193,000	5,295	976	4,319	27.4	5.1	22.4	-1.7		
1977	197,000	4,871	1,067	3,804	24.7	5.4	19.3	1		
1978	202,000	4,362	1,077	3,285	21.7	5.4	16.3	8.5		
1979	206,000	4,809	1,211	3,598	23.3	5.9	17.5	1.9		
1980	211,000	5,035	1,338	3,697	24.0	6.4	17.6	6.1		
1981	215,000	5,251	1,127	4,124	24.4	5.2	19.2	-0.6		
1982	220,000	5,293	1,185	4,108	24.2	5.4	18.8	3.9		
1983	225,000	5,280	1,104	4,176	23.6	4.9	18.6	3.6		
1984	230,000	5,177	1,150	4,027	22.6	5.0	17.6	4.1		
1985	235,000	5,584	1,341	4,243	24.0	5.8	18.2	3.1		
1986	239,000	4,770	1,407	3,363	20.0	5.9	14.1	2.6		
1987	243,000	4,331	1,376	2,955	17.9	5.7	12.2	4.3		
1988	248,000	4,943	1,319	3,624	20.1	5.4	14.7	5.5		
1989	252,000	4,971	1,459	3,512	19.9	5.8	14.0	1.9		
1990	256,000	6,117	1,343	4,774	23.9	5.2	18.6	-3		
1991	261,000	6,192	1,335	4,857	23.7	5.1	18.6	0.6		
1992	266,000	6,759	1,462	5,297	25.4	5.5	19.9	-1.1		
1993	271,000	6,674	1,493	5,181	24.6	5.5	19.1	-0.6		
1994	276,000	6,104	1,538	4,566	22.1	5.6	16.6	1.5		
1995	280,000	6,253	1,638	4,615	22.3	5.8	16.5	-2.2		19.0
1996	284,000	5,913	1,537	4,376	20.8	5.4	15.4	-1.3		18.4
1997	287,000	6,022	1,670	4,352	21.0	5.8	15.2	-4.7		16.4
1998	290,000	5,880	1,800	4,080	20.3	6.2	14.1	-3.8		14.0
1999	293,000	5,367	1,644	3,723	18.3	5.6	12.7	-2.5		15.8
2000	298,000	5,287	1,825	3,462	17.8	6.1	11.6	5.2		14.8
2001	303,000	5,353	1,609	3,744	17.7	5.3	12.4	4.1		12.7
2002	309,000	5,216	1,827	3,389	16.9	5.9	11.0	8.4		16.7
2003	316,000	5,054	1,730	3,324	16.0	5.5	10.5	11.7		17.2
2004	322,000	5,154	1,655	3,499	16.1	5.1	11.0	7.6		17.3
2005	328,320	5,548	1,824	3,724	17.1	5.6	11.5	7.7	2.05	19.6
2006	333,060	5,296	1,730	3,566	16.0	5.2	10.8	3.4	1.93	18.1
2007	337,920	5,854	1,798	4,056	17.5	5.4	12.1	2.3	2.14	17.6
2008	342,830	5,480	1,863	3,617	16.2	5.5	10.7	3.6	2.00	17.9
2009	347,780	5,348	1,981	3,367	15.6	5.7	9.9	4.3	2.03	21.1
2010	351,461	5,049	2,023	3,026	14.4	5.8	8.6	1.9	1.94	19.8
2011	357,750	5,000	2,127	2,873	14.0	5.9	8.1	9.5	1.69	16.2
2012	362,590	4,345	1,937	2,408	12.0	5.3	6.7	6.6	1.76	19.1
2013	367,430	3,935	2,062	1,873	10.7	5.6	5.1	8.1	1.73	22.7
2014	372,380	4,155	2,132	2,023	11.3	5.8	5.5	7.8	1.69	19.4
2015	373,630	4,253	2,243	2,010	11.5	6.1	5.4	-2.1	1.57	20.6
2016	378,040	4,093	2,288	1,805	11.0	6.1	4.9	6.8	1.50	16.0
2017	382,460	4,017	2,372	1,645	10.7	6.3	4.4	7.2	1.47	
2018	386,870	4,286	2,491	1,795	11.2	6.4	4.6	1.8	1.55	
2019	391,260	4,221	2,639	1,582	11.0	6.7	4	7.2	1.51	
2020	395,640	4,316	3,016	1,300	11.1	7.6	3.3	7.8	1.53	
2021	400,000	3,618	3,649	-31	9.2	9.1	-0.1	11	1.26	
2022		3,300			8.3				1.15	

=== Life expectancy at birth ===
total population: 76.13 years. Country comparison to the world: 107th

male: 73.2 years female: 79.14 years (2022 est.)

Period	Life expectancy in Years	Period	Life expectancy in Years
1950–1955	60.0	1985–1990	70.2
1955–1960	62.0	1990–1995	71.1
1960–1965	63.7	1995–2000	71.7
1965–1970	65.2	2000–2005	73.2
1970–1975	66.6	2005–2010	74.3
1975–1980	67.9	2010–2015	75.1
1980–1985	69.1		

Source: UN World Population Prospects

View source data.
View source data.

== Ethnic groups ==
African descent 90.6%, White 4.7%, mixed 2.1%, other 1.9%, unspecified 0.7% (2010 est.) note: data represents population by racial group

== Languages ==
English is the official language of the Bahamas and is the primary language of government, education and public life. In everyday speech, however, many Bahamians use a range of local varieties often referred to locally as “Bahamian dialect”, which linguists describe as involving both Bahamian English and an English-lexifier creole, Bahamian Creole (BahC), existing along a continuum rather than as fully separate “either/or” codes. One overview estimate places the number of speakers of Bahamian Creole at around 250,000.

In historical perspective, Bahamian English have been shaped both by long-standing ties to British English through colonization and by unusually close links with the United States. American influence (via mass media, tourism, education, and mobility) has been repeatedly noted in educated usage, while Bahamian Creole shows particularly strong North American connections (including links to creole varieties of the coastal American South and migration-era transmission).

Language diversity in the modern Bahamas is also affected by immigration. Haitian migration since the 1960s has brought Haitian Creole and French into wider use, and Haitian Creole is widely spoken within Haitian communities in the Bahamas. A 2005 migration study prepared for the International Organization for Migration by The College of The Bahamas documented extensive use of "Creole" in fieldwork with Haitian migrants (including Creole-language interview instruments and high reported Creole speaking ability among respondents).

== Religion ==
In the 2010 census, the three principal religious denominations were Baptist, Anglican and Roman Catholic. In the 2022 census, the Bahamas National Statistical Institute (BNSI) reported a shift: the three largest groups were Baptist, Anglican and non-denominational (tabulated in the census tables within Other Christian Denomination (including non-denominational groups)), with Roman Catholic ranking fourth among the major denominations.

Religious affiliation in the Bahamas, 2010 and 2022 censuses
Denomination / affiliation	2010 census (number)	2010 (%)	2022 census (number)	2022 (%)	Change (pp)
Baptist	122,500	34.9	135,875	34.1	-0.7
Anglican	48,006	13.7	47,456	11.9	-1.7
Other Christian denominations (including non-denominational groups)	41,214	11.7	35,296	8.9	-2.9
Roman Catholic	42,287	12.0	34,749	8.7	-3.3
Pentecostal	31,358	8.9	31,971	8.0	-0.9
Seventh-day Adventist	15,441	4.4	17,502	4.4	0.0
Church of God (including Church of God of Prophecy)	6,732	1.9	19,663	4.9	+3.0
Methodist	12,512	3.6	10,996	2.8	-0.8
Brethren	5,781	1.6	5,823	1.5	-0.2
Jehovah's Witnesses	3,762	1.1	4,225	1.1	0.0
Assemblies of God	2,397	0.7	3,722	0.9	+0.3
African Methodist Episcopal Church	—	—	1,043	0.3	—
Presbyterian	728	0.2	916	0.2	0.0
Lutheran	376	0.1	501	0.1	0.0
Greek Orthodox	447	0.1	356	<0.1	0.0
Latter-day Saints	301	<0.1	182	<0.1	0.0
Rastafarian	790	0.2	1,139	0.3	+0.1
Islam (Muslim)	306	<0.1	336	<0.1	0.0
Hindu	428	0.1	296	<0.1	0.0
Judaism (Jewish)	191	<0.1	190	<0.1	0.0
Baháʼí Faith	65	<0.1	70	<0.1	0.0
Other non-Christian religions	228	<0.1	1,813	0.5	+0.4
None	6,561	1.9	24,677	6.2	+4.3
Atheist	—	—	293	<0.1	—
Not stated	9,050	2.6	19,075	4.8	+2.2
