= Bahamians =

People who originate from The Bahamas

- Flag of the Bahamas

Total population
- c. 460,000

Regions with significant populations
- Bahamas 400,516 (2022)
- United States: 56,498 (2015)
- Canada: 3,675 (2016)
- United Kingdom: 1,797 (2001)
- Jamaica: 1,000

Languages
- English, Bahamian Creole, Haitian Creole, Spanish; Historically Lucayan

Religion
- Christianity ∙ Irreligion ∙ Judaism ∙ Baháʼí Faith ∙ Rastafari ∙ Obeah ∙ Islam ∙ Black Hebrew Israelites ∙ Hinduism

Related ethnic groups
- Caribbean people

Bahamians /bəˈheɪmiənz/ are people originating or having roots from The Bahamas. One can also become a Bahamian by acquiring citizenship.

== History ==
The Lucayan people, the original inhabitants, migrated from Hispaniola and Cuba to settle in the southern islands of the Bahamas around the 11th century CE.

== Religion ==
Religion of Bahamians.
1. Baptist (32.0%)
2. Anglican (20.0%)
3. Roman Catholic (19.0%)
4. Protestant (12.0%)
5. Methodist (6.00%)
6. Church of God (6.00%)
7. None or unknown (3.00%)
8. Other (2.00%)

== List ==
- Sidney Poitier, first black man to win an Oscar, first black Bahamian actor to win Best Actor, first black Bahamian actor to be nominated for best actor.
- Shaunae Miller-Uibo, sprinter, 2016 Olympic 400m champion, and world record holder in 200m straight
- Buddy Hield, basketball player
- Klay Thompson, basketball player
- Rick Fox, three-time NBA champion, owner of Echo Fox
- Lynden Oscar Pindling, first Prime Minister of the Bahamas.
- Joseph Robert Love, important pan-African leader of the 19th and 20th century who influenced Marcus Garvey
- Allan Glaisyer Minns, first black British mayor
- Bert Williams, first black lead actor on Broadway
- Deandre Ayton, was ranked number-one high-school basketball player in the USA by scout in 2015
- Mychal Thompson, two-time NBA champion and first foreign-born player to be selected as 1st pick in the NBA draft history.
- Angela Palacious, first woman deacon and priest of the Diocese of The Bahamas and the Turks and Caicos Islands
- Yves Edwards, mixed martial artist
- Kimbo Slice, streetfighter, boxer and mixed martial artist
- Helen Singer Kaplan, important psychiatrist and sex therapist

== Gallery ==
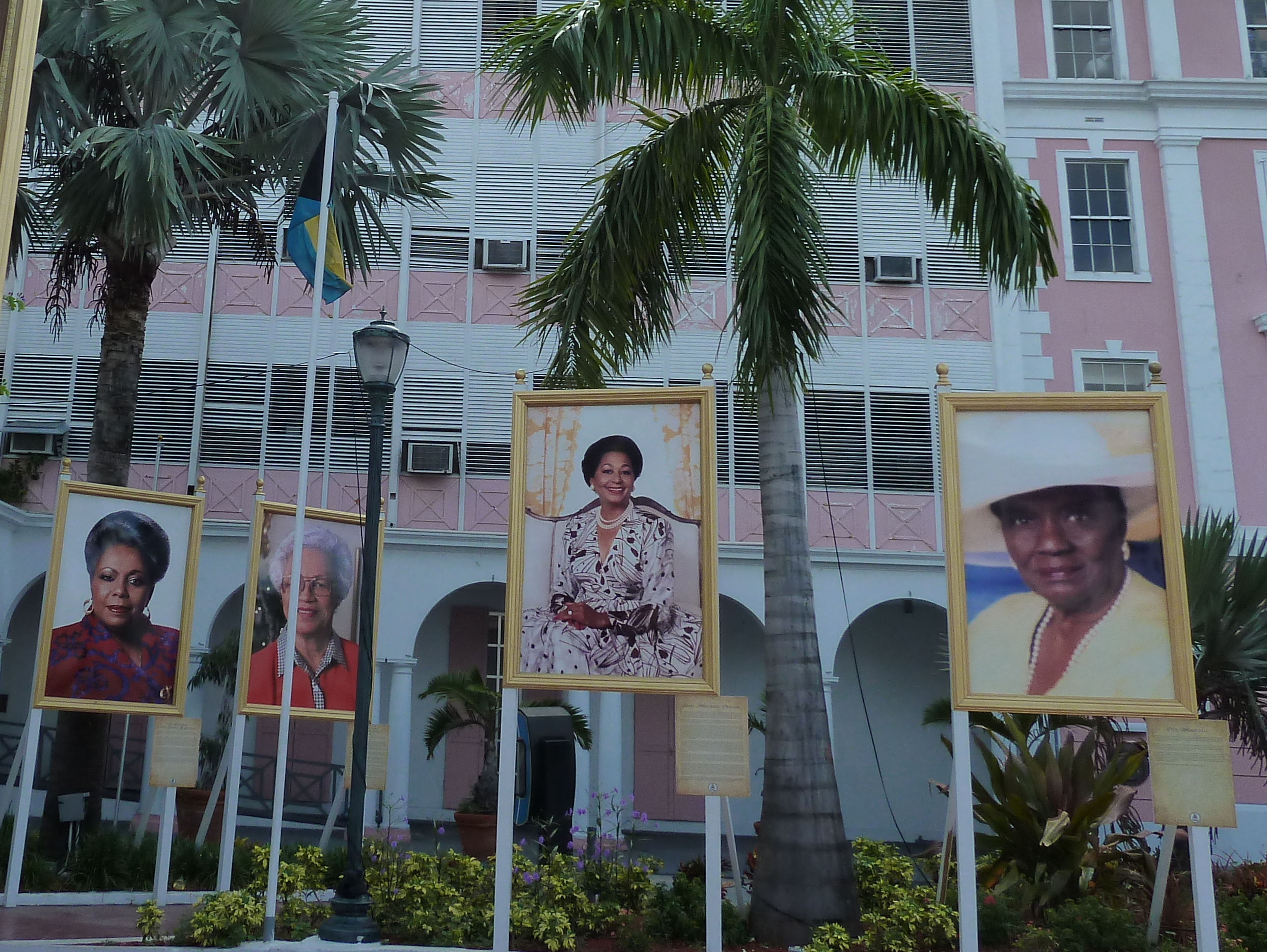
Some women featured in the Leading Women of the Bahamas exhibit, Nassau, 2012.

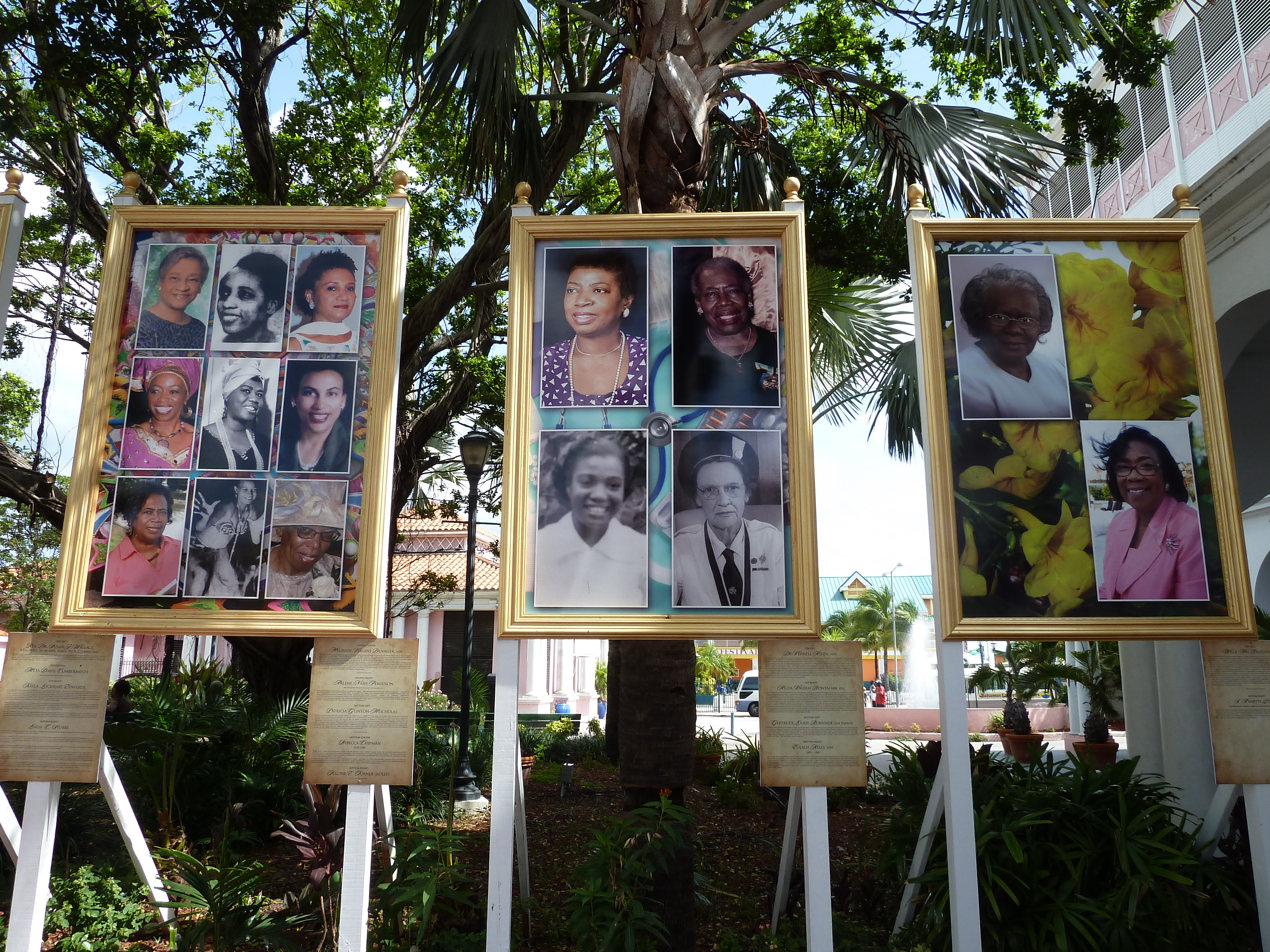
Some women featured in the Leading Women of the Bahamas exhibit, Nassau, 2012.

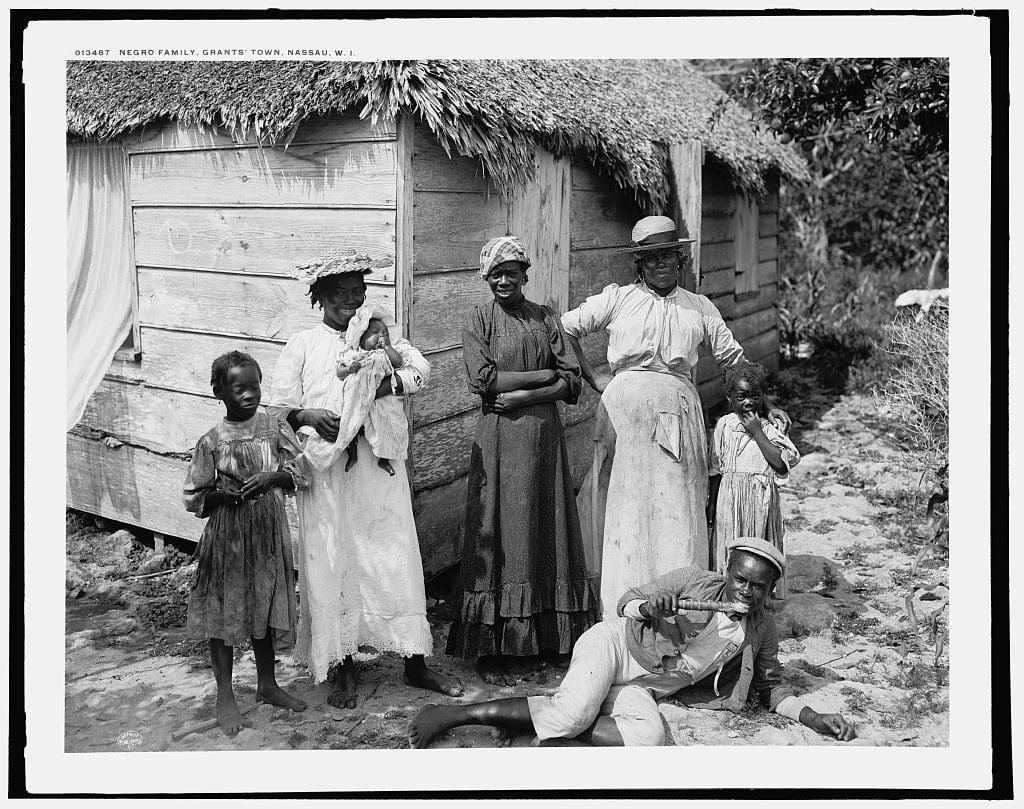
Negro Bahamians

== See also ==
- Demographics of the Bahamas
- Bahamian Americans
