= ZNH-FM =

Contemporary hit radio station in Nassau, Bahamas

- Nassau; Bahamas
- Broadcast area: New Providence, Bahamas
- Frequency: 91.7 MHz
- Branding: Hot 91.7 FM

Programming
- Language: English
- Format: Contemporary hit radio, urban AC

Ownership
- Owner: Associated Media Group. Ltd.

History
- Call sign meaning: ZN (former ITU prefix under United Kingdom rule) Hot 91.7

Technical information
- ERP: 1,000 watts
- Transmitter coordinates: 25°02′41″N 77°22′16″W

Links
- Webcast: http://radio.hot917fm.com
- Website: Official website

ZNH-FM is a radio station in Nassau, Bahamas broadcasting a contemporary hit radio/urban adult contemporary radio format.
