= ZNL-FM =

Adult hits radio station in Nassau, Bahamas

- Nassau; Bahamas
- Broadcast area: New Providence, Bahamas
- Frequency: 97.5 MHz
- Branding: Love 97 FM

Programming
- Language: English
- Format: Adult hits

Ownership
- Owner: Jones Communication Network
- Sister stations: The Bahama Journal

History
- First air date: 2004
- Call sign meaning: ZF (former ITU prefix under United Kingdom rule) Love FM

Technical information
- ERP: 1,000 watts
- HAAT: 35 metres (115 ft)
- Transmitter coordinates: 25°02′44″N 77°19′05″W

Links
- Webcast: http://radiocdn1.streamcomedia.com:5670/love975fm https://tunein.com/radio/Love-FM-975-s3082/

ZNL-FM is an adult hits radio station serving Nassau and New Providence, with a sales office in Freeport. Before becoming Love FM, It was formerly named Pink 97 Radio.
