= Bay Islands English =

English based Creole spoken in Honduras

- caracol
- Region: Bay Islands Department (Honduras)
- Language family: Indo-European: Germanic; West Germanic; North Sea Germanic; Anglo-Frisian; English; Caribbean English; Cayman Islands English; Bay Islands English
- Early forms: Old English: Middle English; Early Modern English; Cayman Islands English
- Writing system: Latin (English alphabet)

Language codes
- ISO 639-3: –
- IETF: en-u-sd-hnib

Bay Islands English is an English based creole spoken in the Bay Islands Department (Guanaja, Roatán, Utila), and the Caribbean coast of Honduras (most notably in the Atlántida Department, and Colón Department). It includes influences from Spanish, Indigenous Languages, African Languages, and later other Caribbean English most notably from the Cayman Islands. Ethnologue reported that there were 22,500 native speakers in 2001. Mainlanders know this language as Caracol, which literally means "conch". Genealogically this variety descends from Cayman Islands English.

== Phonology ==
The NURSE vowel varies in quality in Bay Islands English. Roatan speakers usually realize it as either [ï] or [ʌ], as do Utilian speakers (although among them, the balance favors [ï] over [ʌ]). The dialect largely features the fern-fir-fur split. The FUR vowel is predominantly realized as [ʌ] by Roatan speakers. About 3/4 of male Utila speakers also realize it in this way, but about 5/6 of female Utila speakers realize it as either [ɛ̱] or [ï]. (Among them, [ɛ̱] is also the most common pronunciation for the FERN vowel, while [ï] is also the most common pronunciation for the FIR vowel.) Some Utila speakers also realize the FUR vowel as [ɔ], although pronouncing "turtle" as [tɔɹtil] is also common for Roatan speakers. The FERN vowel is the most varied of the three, as it has possible realizations like [ɔ(:)], [ɒ(:)], [ɑ(:)], [ʌ(:)], [ɛ(:)], [ɛ̱(:)], and [i(:)]. Approximately 12/18 Roatan speakers pronounce it as a low back vowel, while this is not the norm for Utilian speakers. Approximately 5/6 Utilian female speakers pronounce the FERN vowel as a front vowel, while only about 3/18 Roatan speakers pronounce it with a front vowel (in their case, it is never pronounced as [i]). Graham (1997) has noted that all speakers make a distinction between the vowel qualities in the words "learn" and "girl", while 26/28 speakers distinguish the vowel in "learn" from those in "third" and "bird". He has also theorized that the fern-fir-fur split in Bay Islands English is likely a result of influence from Scottish English, which also has this phenomenon, and neither RP nor GA having a strong dominant influence on the dialect's historical phonological development.

Bay Islands English is generally rhotic. Most white speakers always pronounce it as /r/. It is often elided in post-vocalic, and especially in unstressed word-final position, among black speakers.

Bay Islands English has poor distinction between the sounds [v] and [w]. The two sounds are often merged with each other (and sometimes, [b], resulting in a four-way whine-wine-vine-bine merger) or substituted in opposing positions. Graham cites the influence of the Twi language, which lacks /v/ in its phoneme inventory, and other West African languages with the same feature as a likely cause for this. A similar process also occurs in Bermudian, Bahamian, Saban, Vincentian, and other Caribbean Englishes. However, it is also possible for these sounds ([w] and [β]) to be realized as variants of a single phoneme. Warantz also claims that [w] occurs categorically before /a/, /ʌ/, and /ə/ and variably with [β] in all other environments. However, the phonemic contrast in Bay Island English is generally neutralized in all environments, with possible realizations including [w], [v], [β], [ɥ], [ʋ], [b], and [ɞ]. Graham has judged [w̥] (Note: In his document, Graham used w̥ to denote a labio-palatal/velar approximant, which has no IPA symbol.) as the most common realization, and the usual realization of /v/ post-vocally. A word-final /v/ (as in have, live or love) is often raised through the influence of the following element, thus causing it to be realized as either [w̥] or a vowel with a [ɞ]-like quality. This results in intervocal sequences such as [ɐw̥], [ɛw̥], and [ɵw̥]. [w] can occur before both front and non-front values, and it is only unlikely to occur before [i] and [e]. [ɥ] can only occur before [i] and [ɪ]. [β] occurs before [ɪ], [e], and [ɛ]. [v] occurs in the same positions as in Standard English, but never where SE has [w]. Whenever [v] occurs intervocally or as the first element of a consonant cluster, it may be dropped altogether. This results in pronunciations such as [nɒ:r] (never), [hʌn] (having) and [pe:d] (paved). [b] is found sporadically among creole-influenced speakers.

== Bibliography ==
- Graham, Ross (1997). Bay Islands English: Linguistic Contact and Convergence in the Western Caribbean (PDF) (PhD thesis). University of Florida.
- Graham, Ross (2010). "Honduras/Bay Islands English". In Schreirer, Daniel; Trudgill, Peter; Schneider, Edgar W.; Williams, Jeffrey P. (eds.). The Lesser-Known Varieties of English: An Introduction. Cambridge University Press. pp. 92–135. doi:10.1017/CBO9780511676529.007. ISBN 978-1-139-48741-2.
- Warantz, Elissa (1983). "The Bay Islands English of Honduras". In Holm, John A. (ed.). Central American English. Heidelberg: Julius Groos Verlag. pp. 71–94. ISBN 3-87276-295-8.
