= ZNY-FM =

Radio station

- Nassau; Bahamas
- Broadcast area: New Providence, Bahamas
- Frequency: 98.7 MHz
- Branding: Y98 Radio

Programming
- Language: English
- Format: Hot adult contemporary

History
- Call sign meaning: ZN (former ITU prefix under United Kingdom rule) Y

Technical information
- ERP: 1,000 watts
- HAAT: 35 metres (115 ft)
- Transmitter coordinates: 25°02′44″N 77°19′05″W

Links
- Webcast: Listen Live

ZNY-FM is a hot adult contemporary radio station in Nassau, Bahamas.
