= Afro–Turks and Caicos Islanders =

Ethnic group

Black Turks and Caicos Islanders
Total population
- Approx. 41,832

Regions with significant populations
- Turks and Caicos Islands (Approx. 41,832)

Languages
- English, Turks and Caicos Creole

Religion
- Christianity

Related ethnic groups
- Afro-Caymanian, Afro-Bahamian

Afro–Turks and Caicos Islanders or Black Turks and Caicos Islanders are Turks and Caicos Islanders who are of African descent.

As of 2013, people of African descent are the majority ethnic group in the Turks and Caicos Islands accounting for around 87.6% of the territory's population.

== History ==
Prior to the onset of European slavery, the Turks and Caicos Islands were occupied by the Lucayan people, a branch of the Taíno from South America. They settled in the islands approximately between 700 and 1000 AD, leading a tranquil life until their swift decline following Christopher Columbus’ arrival in 1492, which was precipitated by disease and enslavement due to the Spanish. With the indigenous population decimated, the islands remained largely deserted for more than two hundred years, frequented only by pirates and, subsequently, salt rakers from Bermuda. The establishment of permanent settlements and the introduction of African slaves for the salt and cotton industries commenced in the late 17th and late 18th centuries, respectively.

The first recorded African slaves were brought to Turks and Caicos by the Bermudans to work in the salt ponds. The next large introduction of African slaves came when American Loyalist fled the United States after the War of Independence, setting up plantations on the Turks and Caicos Islands. In 1788 the Caicos Islands had a population of over 40 white families and 1200 slaves.
