= Afro-Anguillians =

Black Anguillians
Total population
- Approx. 14,194

Regions with significant populations
- Anguilla (Approx. 14,194)

Languages
- English

Religion
- Christianity

Related ethnic groups
- Afro-Caribbean

Afro-Anguillians or Black Anguillians are Anguillian whose ancestry lies within the continent of Africa, most notably West Africa.

As of 2013, people of solely African descent are the majority ethnic group in Anguilla, accounting for 90.1% of the country's population. An additional 4.6% of the country is mulatto.

== History ==
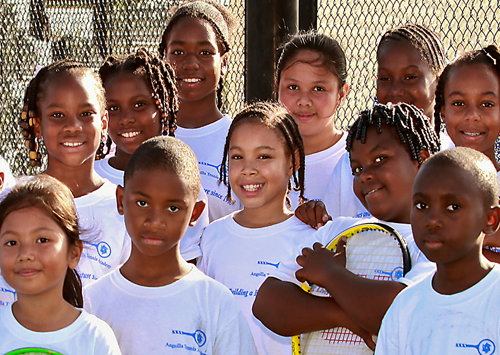
Afro-Anguillians in a children's tennis group

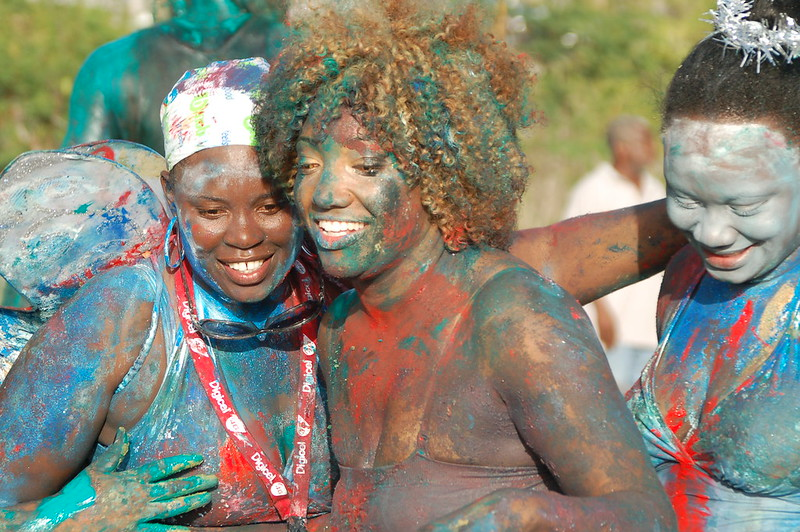
Afro-Anguillians at Carnival

Christopher Columbus designated the island of Anguilla—meaning "eel" in Spanish—during one of his early voyages to the Caribbean at the close of the fifteenth century. Many historians now contend that it was likely French explorers, who passed the island while traveling from Dominica to Florida in the mid-sixteenth century, that made the first European contact with it. Regardless of when Europeans may have arrived at Anguilla, its Indigenous Amerindian inhabitants had likely resided there since at least 1300 B.C.E. By the time Columbus made his initial visit to the Caribbean in 1492, significant communities of Arawakan-speaking people were inhabiting Anguilla, which they referred to as Malliouhana. Within a few decades of the initial European settlement of Anguilla, the island's entire Amerindian population had nearly vanished, victims of both enslavement and diseases brought by Europeans. The first settlement in Anguilla was established by English colonists in 1650. Despite attempts at invasion by the French, the Irish, and Caribs from Dominica, Anguilla was one of the few Caribbean islands that remained under the control of a single power throughout the colonial era. The British utilized Anguilla in a manner similar to their exploitation of other territories in the Caribbean: planters swiftly set up estates, which were worked by enslaved individuals from West Africa. Due to its small size and less fertile soil compared to some neighboring islands, Anguilla did not develop the extensive plantation economy that many of its counterparts did. Instead, it evolved into a small-scale slave society, and most present-day Anguillans are descendants of those initial black slaves.

Before the arrival of Europeans in the Caribbean, Anguilla was inhabited by Arawakan-speaking Native Americans who called the Island Malliouhana. Anguilla was colonized in 1650 by British settlers from Saint Kitts and thereafter become a British colony. The British did not encounter any Arawakan-speaking people in Anguilla, but in 1656 a raid by Native Americans from one of the neighbouring islands wiped out their settlement. The early years were difficult for the European colonists. Due to increase demand for sugar in Europe, British colonizers began producing sugarcane using enslaved Africans. Several mixed-race mulatto slaves that were children of their masters were often willed freedom and in some cases willed land. In addition to the mulatto class of manumissions, there are cases of Anguillian slaves being rented for their labour to other islands and using the compensation to purchase their freedom and plots of land for paltry sums, as the land was often seen as fruitless by their previous masters.
