= Cayman Islands English =

Variety of English spoken in the Cayman Islands

- Region: Cayman Islands
- Language family: Indo-European: Germanic; West Germanic; North Sea Germanic; Anglo-Frisian; Anglic; English; Caribbean English; Cayman Islands English
- Writing system: Latin (English alphabet)

Language codes
- ISO 639-3: –
- IETF: en-KY

Cayman Islands English, also called Caymanian English, is an English variety spoken in the Cayman Islands. Its early development was influenced by Early Modern English, Guinea Coast Creole English, and the Igbo and Twi languages of West Africa. More recent influences include Standard English, Jamaican Patois and African-American Vernacular English. It has been described as both a non-creole and a semi-creole, due to its differences from and similarity to Caribbean Creole languages.

About 90% of Caymanians speak English, as the official language of the islands, but Cayman Islands English encompasses a broad range of dialects. Bay Island English is a related English variant which developed from Cayman Islands English.

== Origins ==
Cayman Island English has its roots in the language used by the earliest settlers on the islands, including turtle fishers, pirates, enslaved Africans, and deserters from Cromwell's Jamaican army. It was influenced by English, Spanish, and West African languages, such as Twi. An early creole or pidgin contact language, Guinea Coast Creole English, was likely a direct influence, as with the Caribbean Creole languages. Because of the Cayman Islands' remoteness, Caymanian English also retains elements of Elizabethan English speech, including elements from Elizabethan Cockney, Cornish, Scottish and Yorkshire dialects. African-American Vernacular English and Jamaican Patois have also influenced the way younger Caymanians speak, while Bay Island English in turn derives from Cayman Island English.

While not much has been written on Cayman Islands English, according to linguist John A. Holm, it "seems to have borrowed English-based creole features similar to Jamaican Patois, Bay Islands English and San Andrés and Providencia Creole without having undergone creolization". Others, such as Hubert Devonish, dispute this and point to features in Caymanian English that are common to Caribbean Creole languages. Devonish says that phrases such as im now to swim ("he knows [how] to swim") indicate more creolisation in the language than was realised by scholars such as Kohlman and Holm. Ross Graham says that Caymanian English's creole elements could be inherited from an earlier creole language spoken by the Black Caymanians, similar to Jamaican Creole, which gradually became decreolised due to contact with British Caymanians.

== Phonology ==
Intonation in Cayman Islands English often falls on the last syllable of polysyllabic words. The use of [v] for [w], such as ven instead of when, is a feature of Cayman Islands English, noted by Aarona Booker Kohlman and John A. Holm. Ross Graham says this is likely influenced by the Twi language. Hubert Devonish says this is common to many Western Caribbean creole languages, although Kohlman and Holm suggest this might have a connection to Elizabethan Cockney English. The use of broad English [æ] as in bangle is retained while [r] in words like turn and sermon is often unvoiced. Possessive pronouns such as his and hers are often replaced with their subjective form, such as he and she. Noun determiners and prepositions are also often excluded, as in When I get Spotts, little rain come down (or "When I got to Spotts, a little rain came down"). Devonish suggests this more pronounced than in Caribbean Creoles. It's also common for some Caymanians to insert -en before -ing; Patricia Hamilton notes such as examples as fishening or groanening.

== Glossary ==
- Bobo (a pet name for a close friend, beloved or partner)
- Boy look yah, who you fuh? ("Boy, look at you! Who are your parents/who raised you?")
- Cool out ("chill out")
- Cow knows where weak fence is (bullies can tell who's easy to pick on)
- Donkey doon belong in horse race ("A donkey doesn't belong in a horse race"; i.e., this is no concern of yours/mind your own business)
- Every crab from the bush ("everybody", in reference to the swarms of crabs that emerge from the bush in certain seasons)
- Every pot knows its own bottom ([know when to] take responsibility for your actions)
- Find yoh backside home right now ("Get your backside home right now [or you're in trouble]")
- From time hatchet wah hamma ("From the time when the hatchet was a hammer"; i.e., from a long time ago)
- Greedy choke puppy ("Greed chokes the puppy"; i.e., greed carries consequences)
- Horse laugh (uncontrollable laughter)
- I n’ errybody ("me and everybody"/"everybody and I")
- If you can’t get Harry, you take his jacket (i.e., if you don't get what you want, at least settle for the next best thing)
- I heard it on the marl road ("I heard it on the grapevine"/"I heard a rumour")
- John is running Mary ("they are dating")
- Stoopidness ("Stupidness" or foolishness)
- Ya so? ("So what?")
- You'll be satisfied when you get a mouthful of sand ("you'll [only] be satisfied when you're buried/dead")
- Daddey (Meaning: Daddy, Father, etc)
- Mummah (Mum-ah) (Meaning: Mommy, Mom, Mother, etc)
- Take a fresh (Taking a shower)

== See also ==
- Bay Islands Creole English
- Bermudian Creole English
- Jamaican Patois
- San Andrés–Providencia Creole
- Turks and Caicos Creole
