= Jeanne Odo =

Saint-Domingue abolitionist and supercentenarian

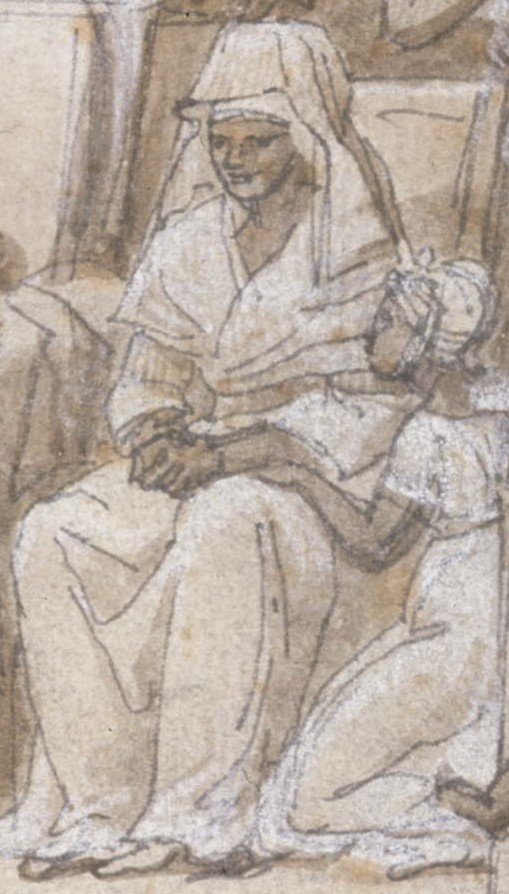
- Jeanne Odo at the tribune in 1794, by French painter Nicolas-André Monsiau.
- Born: c. 1679; Port-au-Prince, Saint-Domingue
- Other name: Andotte
- Occupation: Abolitionist

Jeanne Odo (born c. 1679) was a former slave who was born in Port-au-Prince and became an abolitionist of Saint-Domingue (now Haiti), and a supercentenarian. She was known for presenting herself to the National Convention in Paris as part of a delegation to call for the abolition of slavery when she was 114 in 1793. Due to the campaign, a new constitution was written to prevent the sale of slaves.

== Life ==
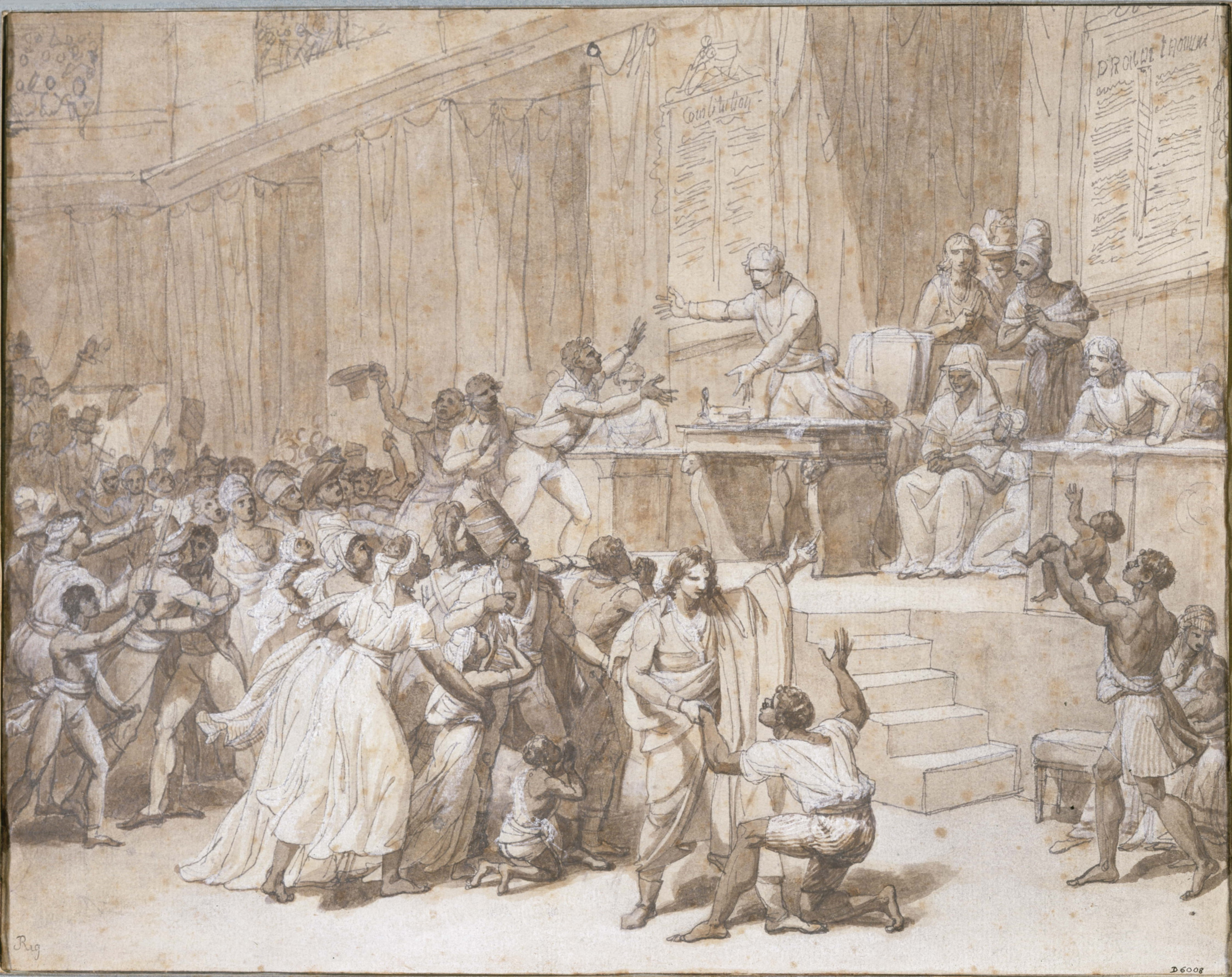
The insurrection of the slaves of Saint-Domingue continued in Paris. The free people of color entered the convention and demanded the abolition of slavery in the colonial empire of Ancien Régime. Jeanne Odo is seen in the gallery with a young girl.

Jeanne Odo was born into slavery in Port-au-Prince, Saint-Domingue (now Haiti) in c. 1679. She was of mixed-race.

On 3 June 1793, Odo, accompanied by a delegation of freed black slaves was enthusiastically received at the Jacobin Club by the deputies François Louis Bourdon de l'Oise, Chabot, Maximilien de Robespierre, Jeanbon Saint-André, Legendre, Maure, along with other members. Chabot pledged his solidarity with the group.

The following day, on 4 June, at the age of 114, Odo led the delegation into the National Convention in Paris. The group paraded a new flag to symbolise equality, freedom and the end of colonial racial hierarchy. The flag featured three stripes: a black man on the blue stripe, a white man on the white stripe, and a mulatto on the red stripe, with all of them carrying pikes and wearing liberty caps. Upon Odo's entrance, the entire assembly stood up in her honour. She walked in holding the arms of two petitioners, was kissed and embraced by the assembly's president, who seated her in an armchair beside him.

On 24 June 1793, as a result of the campaign, a new constitution was enacted, preventing the sale of any person. The following month, the assembly promised the delegates their support in their aim of "liberty to America", and the president placed a crown upon Odo's head.

== See also ==
- Slavery
- Timeline of abolition of slavery and serfdom
- Abolitionism
- Jacobin
