= Wendy Phipps =

Kittitian politician (born 1967)

Wendy Colleen Phipps (born 24 November 1967) is a Kittitian politician and businesswoman.

== Early life and education ==
Phipps was born on 24 November 1967 on Saint Kitts. Her mother was from Nevis and her father from Saint Kitts. She has a B.A. in humanities/journalism (1991) from the University of the Virgin Islands and a Masters in Mass Communication (1992) from the University of Georgia.

From 1994 to 2010 she was employed by the St. Kitts-Nevis Chamber of Industry and Commerce, becoming an executive director. In 2010 she founded her own consultancy company, Trinity Business Services/The Main Event.

== Political career ==
In February 2015 Phipps was appointed as a Senator in the National Assembly and as Minister of State with responsibility for Health, Community Development, Gender Affairs and Social Services. She served as Health Minister until 2020 and was then appointed as Minister of International Trade, Consumer Affairs and Labor in the Team Unity cabinet.

In June 2023, no longer a Minister, she was elected chairperson of the People's Labour Party.
