= Bahamian Creole =

English-based creole language of the Bahamas

Bahamian
- Native to: The Bahamas
- Ethnicity: Bahamians
- Language family: English-African Creole: Guinea Coast Creole English; Caribbean English Creole; Eastern Caribbean; Gullah–Nevis–Antigua; Bahamian–Gullah; Bahamian

Language codes
- ISO 639-3: bah
- Glottolog: baha1260
- Linguasphere: 52-ABB-an–ao

Bahamian Creole (BahC), also known as Bahamian dialect, Bahamian Creole English (BCE), or simply Bahamian, is an English-based creole language spoken in the Bahamas.

"Bahamian dialect", as it is commonly called in the Bahamas, suffers from limited research, possibly because it has long been assumed that it is simply a variety of English. One study, however, identified four distinct Bahamian varieties along a creole continuum ranging from more to less prestigious: acrolectal, upper-mesolectal, mid-mesolectal, and basilectal. The mid-mesolectal and basilectal varieties, in particular, are those locally referred to as Bahamian dialect.

Islands that were settled earlier, or that have a historically large Black Bahamian population, have a greater concentration of individuals exhibiting creole (or basilectal) speech, while other varieties are more common in Nassau.

Bahamian Creole English shares similar features with other English-based creoles, such as those of Jamaica, Barbados, Trinidad and Tobago, Turks and Caicos, Saint Lucia, Grenada, St. Vincent and the Grenadines, Guyana, and the Virgin Islands. There is also a very significant link between Bahamian and the Gullah language of South Carolina, as many Bahamians are descendants of enslaved African peoples brought to the islands from the Gullah region after the American Revolution.

== Dialect versus creole ==
The debate as to whether Bahamian is a variety of English or a distinct creole language is a fairly recent one having started at the beginning of the 1980s. As it was, for a long time, considered to be a simple variety of English, very little research was carried out on it compared to other Caribbean English varieties.

There was no consensus that Bahamian English might include a creole as late as the 1970s, as attempts to categorise the language, in terms of lexicon, phonology and syntax, overlooked variation. A 1978 dissertation was the first to suggest that Afro-Bahamian dialect might be a creole existing somewhere between Black American English and "creoles such as Gullah, Jamaican and Guyanese Creoles". Linguists and academics now maintain that what is commonly referred to in the Bahamas as Bahamian dialect is a continuum ranging from an English dialect on one end to an English-based creole on the other end, with regional and sociocultural markers and differentiations along the spectrum. The dissertation suggested that Bahamian English was a creole that had been decreolised, however, there is some evidence of the reverse: that is that creolisation of Bahamian English increased when American Loyalists arrived in the Bahamas with African slaves. The dissertation covered only some settlements on a few islands and also assumed that Bahamian dialect split along ethnic lines. Bahamian dialect is more varied than once thought. Linguists Becky Childs and Walt Wolfram note that "few Caribbean varieties have such a full range of potential English input dialects" as Bahamian English.

What Bahamians refer to as Bahamian dialect, academics often refer to as a creole, though no consensus exists. Both the mesolectal and basilectical varieties are referred to as Bahamian dialect, while research into educated (or acrolectal) varieties of Caribbean English (or varieties that differ little from English) is still lacking when compared with basilectal varieties that differ significantly.

== Pronunciation ==
There is a tendency for speakers of BCE to drop /h/ or, in a hypercorrection, to add it to words without it so harm and arm are pronounced the same. The merger occurs most often in the speech of Abaco and north Eleuthera.

Some speakers have merged /v/ and /w/ into a single phoneme and pronounce words with [v] or [w] depending on context (the latter appearing in word-initial position and the former appearing elsewhere). Outside of White acrolectal speech, speakers have no dental fricatives and English cognate words are usually pronounced with [d] or [t] as in dis ('this') and tink ('think'). Other characteristics of Bahamian Creole English in comparison to Standard English include:

- Merger of the vowels of fair and fear into [ɛə]
- Free variation of the happy vowel between [ɪ] and [i].
- The vowel of first merges with that of fuss (into [ʌ]) among some and with the vowel of foist (into [ʌɪ]) in others.
- As the creole is non-rhotic; /r/ is not pronounced unless it is before a vowel. For example, "Hard" turns in to "Haad" with the "a" being lengthed in the absence of the rhotic.
- Final clusters are often simplified, especially when they share voicing (gold > gol, but not milk > *mil).
- The pin–pen merger occurs.

== Grammar ==
Pronouns in Bahamian Creole English are generally the same as in Standard English. However, the second person plural can take one of three forms:

- yinna,
- y'all or
- all a ya

Possessive pronouns in BCE often differ from Standard English with:

- your becoming ya
- his or hers becoming he or she

and

- their becoming dey.

For example, das ya book? means 'is that your book?'

In addition, the possessive pronouns differ from Standard English:

English	Bahamian
mine	mines
yours	yawnz (s.) or yawz (s.)
yours	yinnas (pl.)
his	he own
hers	har own
ours	ah own
theirs	dey own/ders

When describing actions done alone or by a single group, only.. one is used, as in only me one sing ('I'm the only one who sang') and only Mary one gern Nassau ('Mary is the only one who is going to Nassau')

=== Verbs ===
Verb usage in the BCE differs significantly from that of Standard English. There is also variation amongst speakers. For example, the word go:

1) I'm going to Freeport:

- I goin ta Freeport
- I gern ta Freeport
- I gun go Freeport

2) I am going to cook

- I ga cook
- I gern cook
- I gern go cook

Similarly, verb "to do" has numerous variations depending on tense and context:

- I does eat conch erry day ('I eat conch every day')
- Wa you does do? ('what kind of work do you do?')
- "He gone dat way" (used while pointing in a direction, means that is where the person went).

In the present tense, the verb "to be" is usually conjugated "is" regardless of the grammatical person:

- I am – I is or "Ise” (pronounced "eyes")
- You are – You is or "You's", pronounced "use"
- We are – We is or "We's", pronounced "weez"
- They are – Dey is or "Dey's"

The negative form of "to be" usually takes the form "een" (ain't) I een gern ('I am not goin')

While context is often used to indicate tense (e.g. I drink plenny rum las night = 'I drank a lot of rum last night'), the past tense can also be formed by combining "did", "done", "gone", or "been" with the verb:

- She tell him already ('she already told him')
- I dun (done) tell you
- He tell her she was fat ('he told her she was fat')
- Why you do dat? ('why did you do that?')
- I bin (been) Lutra last week ('I went to Eleuthera last week')

== Lexicon ==
In 1982, Holm and Shilling released a 228 page Dictionary of Bahamian English containing over 5,000 words, including words both familiar to other English speakers as well as purely Bahamian terms.

Bahamian Creole English contains links with British and American English, West African languages, and Spanish. Holm and Shilling also attempted to identify links between Bahamian terms to other English-based creoles, like Gullah.

=== Examples ===
- asue: a cooperative savings system traced to a Yoruba custom of éèsú or èsúsú; similar schemes are common in other Caribbean countries, e.g. the susu in Barbados.
- benny: sesame seed, grown locally and used in the popular treat benny cake found in various forms throughout the African Diaspora.
- Jook: to stab or poke, possibly from the West African word of the same meaning. This word is found in many Caribbean creole languages.
- Obeah: Witchcraft.
- Nanny (noun) – fecal matter or excretory waste.
- Peasyhead – addresses the fact that a person's hair has tight curls at the nape of their head.
- Pickney (noun) – a small child.
- Yinna (pronoun) – you (plural).

== See also ==
- Gullah language
- Turks and Caicos Creole
- Jamaican Creole
- Haitian Creole, a French-based creole spoken in the Bahamas by Haitian immigrants

== Bibliography ==
- Holm, John A.; Shilling, Alison Watt (1982), Dictionary of Bahamian English, Cold Spring, New York: Lexik House, ISBN 978-0-936368-03-0
- Reaser, Jeffrey (2010), "Bahamian English", in Schreier, Daniel; Trudgill, Peter; Schneider, Edgar W.; Williams, Jeffrey (eds.), The Lesser Known Varieties of English: An Introduction, Cambridge: Cambridge University Press, pp. 158–170
- Wells, John Christopher (1982), Accents of English: Beyond the British Isles, vol. 3, Cambridge: Cambridge University Press
