= Bermudian English =

Regional dialect of English

- Native to: Bermuda
- Native speakers: 63,917 (2016)
- Language family: Indo-European: Germanic; West Germanic; North Sea Germanic; Anglo-Frisian; Anglic; English; British English; Bermudian English
- Writing system: Latin (English alphabet)

Official status
- Regulated by: not regulated

Language codes
- ISO 639-3: –
- IETF: en-BM

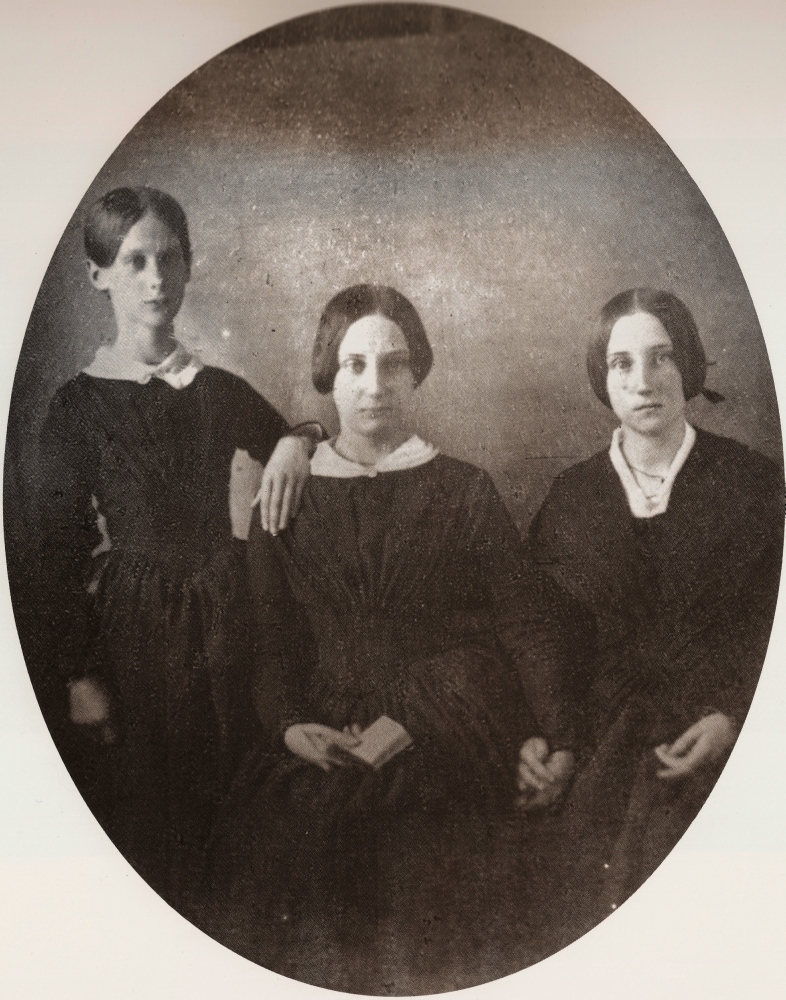
Bermudian sisters Rosalie, Helen and Ellesif Darrell in 1846

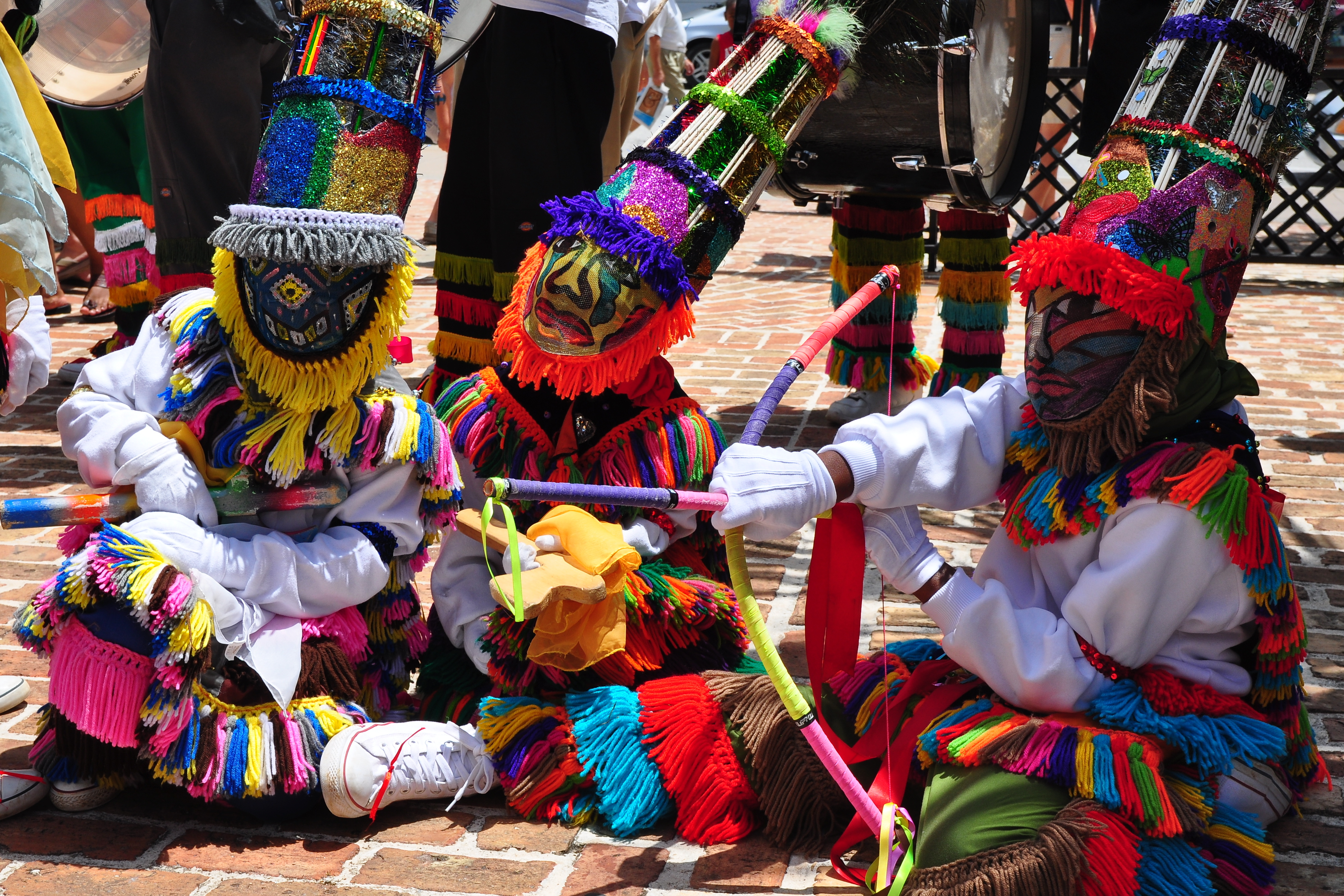
Gombeys

Bermudian English is a regional dialect of English found in Bermuda, a British Overseas Territory in the North Atlantic. Standard English is used in professional settings and in writing, while vernacular Bermudian English is spoken on more casual occasions. The Bermudian dialect began to develop following settlement in the early 17th century and retains traits of Elizabethan English. Bermudian Creole is also spoken in Bermuda, especially among younger Bermudians.

Casual observers tend to have difficulty in placing the Bermudian dialect, as it differs from those that are clearly British, American, or Caribbean; they also note that the accent tends to vary between individuals. It is often said to sound American or West Indian to a British ear, and quaintly British to American listeners.

== Categorisation ==
Often described as one of the least researched dialects of English, Bermudian English was never creolised and is technically a koiné—a dialect arising from contact between multiple varieties of the same language. It has been influenced by British and Irish Englishes, Caribbean Englishes (including early influence from Bahamian English and Turks and Caicos Creole, as well as later influence from Jamaican Patwah), North American Englishes, and Azorean Portuguese. While some scholars have argued for its inclusion as a dialect of American English, English writer and historian Rosemary Hall says it should be considered in a category of its own. Hall says, "While it's true that Bermudian English shares a range of words and sounds with British, American, and Caribbean Englishes, it also has many unique features, meaning it's probably most accurate to say that it's a dialect in a category of its own." Scholars have also noted that there are differences between the English used by white Bermudians, which may be closer to North American English; and that used by some Black Bermudians, which may be closer to Caribbean English.

The first detailed scholarly study of Bermudian English conducted by Harry Morgan Ayers in 1933, stated this type of speech "would create least remark, if indeed any, between, say, Norfolk, Virginia, and Charleston, South Carolina". Bermuda was settled from England, as an extension of the Colony of Virginia, Charleston and the Carolina Province were settled from Bermuda, and Bermuda retained close links with both into the 19th century. The start of Bermuda's tourism industry in the latter 19th century would see transport connections move to the North East of the United States, from where most of its visitors continue to come.

In certain aspects of vocalization, some Bermudian English dialects are close to some versions of Caribbean English, and some would bracket all these varieties to the broad region of the "English-speaking West Indies". West Indian workers arrived on the island from the 1900s, primarily working in construction and settling mostly in north-eastern Pembroke/north-western Devonshire, and in Sandys, while Americans arrived due to US bases in Bermuda from 1941 to 1995. There is evidence to suggest that the St. David's dialect could actually be a decreolised English variety.

Azorean Portuguese influenced Bermudian English to a lesser degree, as a result of immigration after slavery was made illegal on the island in 1834.

== Phonology ==
The dialect's most evident characteristic is a variation in letter/sound assignment. The transposition of [v] to [w], characteristic of many dialects in Southern England during the 18th and 19th centuries, and of [d] and [dʒ] (similarly to the dialects of English speakers of Gaelic heritage), when combined with a front vowel, can both be seen in the title of a humorous glossary, Bermewjan Vurds (Bermudian Words).

Bermuda was administratively part of continental British America until the 1783 independence of the colonies that became the United States of America, and thereafter was part of British North America, within which it was grouped with the Maritimes until 1867, at which point, as an Imperial fortress, it was left out of the formation of the Canadian dominion and remained under the administration of the British Government, which increasingly grouped Bermuda for convenience with the British West Indian colonies (usually termed the West Indies and Bermuda or the Caribbean and Bermuda).

It is unclear whether any similarities between Bermudian English and Newfoundland English date from this period, or pre-date it. The use of [æ] and [ɛ] is interchangeable and vowels are often elongated. [θ] and [ð] turn into [f] and [v], respectively. Bermudian is also non-rhotic, like British English or the New York accent. There's a simplification of codas like 'best' and 'soft" become bes and sof. Coda [ɫ] is semivocalized to [w].

== Bermudian Creole ==
Bermudian Creole
- Native to: Bermuda
- Language family: English creole: Atlantic; Western; Jamaican Patois; Bermudian Creole

Official status
- Regulated by: not regulated

Language codes
- ISO 639-3: –
- IETF: jam-BM

Bermudian Creole is a creolized form of Bermudian English (similar and related to the English-based creoles: Caymanian English, Turks and Caicos Creole, and San Andrés–Providencia Creole). It is a dialect of Jamaican Patois, which is also spoken in Bermuda, especially among Bermuda's younger generations.

Bermudian Creole is significantly influenced by Jamaican Patwah and shares many of the same words such as Bredren (Friend), Di (The), Gwine (Going), and Wahm (What's happening). This is due to a shared heritage, and the close familial ties that many Bermudians have to Jamaica, such as Premier David Burt, Wayne Caines (MP), and former Premier Ewart Brown. Similarly Bermuda has also produced a number of internationally renowned Dancehall and Reggae artists, such as Mishka and Collie Buddz, who are both native Creole speakers.

=== Common Bermudian Creole Words ===
Word	Meaning
Aceboy / Acegirl	Good friend
Backa *	At the back of / Behind
Bermy	Bermuda / Bermudian
Bredren *	Friend
Bye	Boy
Chingas	Wow
Chopse / Chopsing	Chatting / Gossiping / Time-wasting
Criss *	Nice / Cool / Awesome
Deal wid *	To handle in a rigorous manner
Di *	The
Di Rock	Bermuda
Ganzy *	T-shirt / Sweater / Outfit
Gombey	Junkanoo
Greeze	Food / Meal
Gribble	Angry / Irritable / Bad-tempered
Gwine *	Going
Micing	Daydreaming
Mindral	Soda
Seen *	I understand
Session *	Party
Shadeesh	Sausage
Wahm *	What's happening
Wotless *	Worthless / Wreckless
Wrinch	Scold / Reprimand
Yute *	Youth

(Shared words: Bermudian / Jamaican) *

== See also ==
- Bahamian English - another English dialect with significant American phonological influence, albeit from more recent language shifts
- Turks and Caicos Creole
- Cayman Islands English
- Jamaican Patois
- San Andrés–Providencia Creole
