= Turks and Caicos Creole =

English-based creole of Turks and Caicos

- Native to: Turks and Caicos Islands
- Native speakers: 34,000 (2019)
- Language family: English Creole: Atlantic; Eastern Caribbean; Gullah–Nevis–Antigua; Bahamian Creole; Turks and Caicos Creole

Language codes
- ISO 639-3: tch
- Glottolog: turk1310
- Linguasphere: 52-ABB-ao

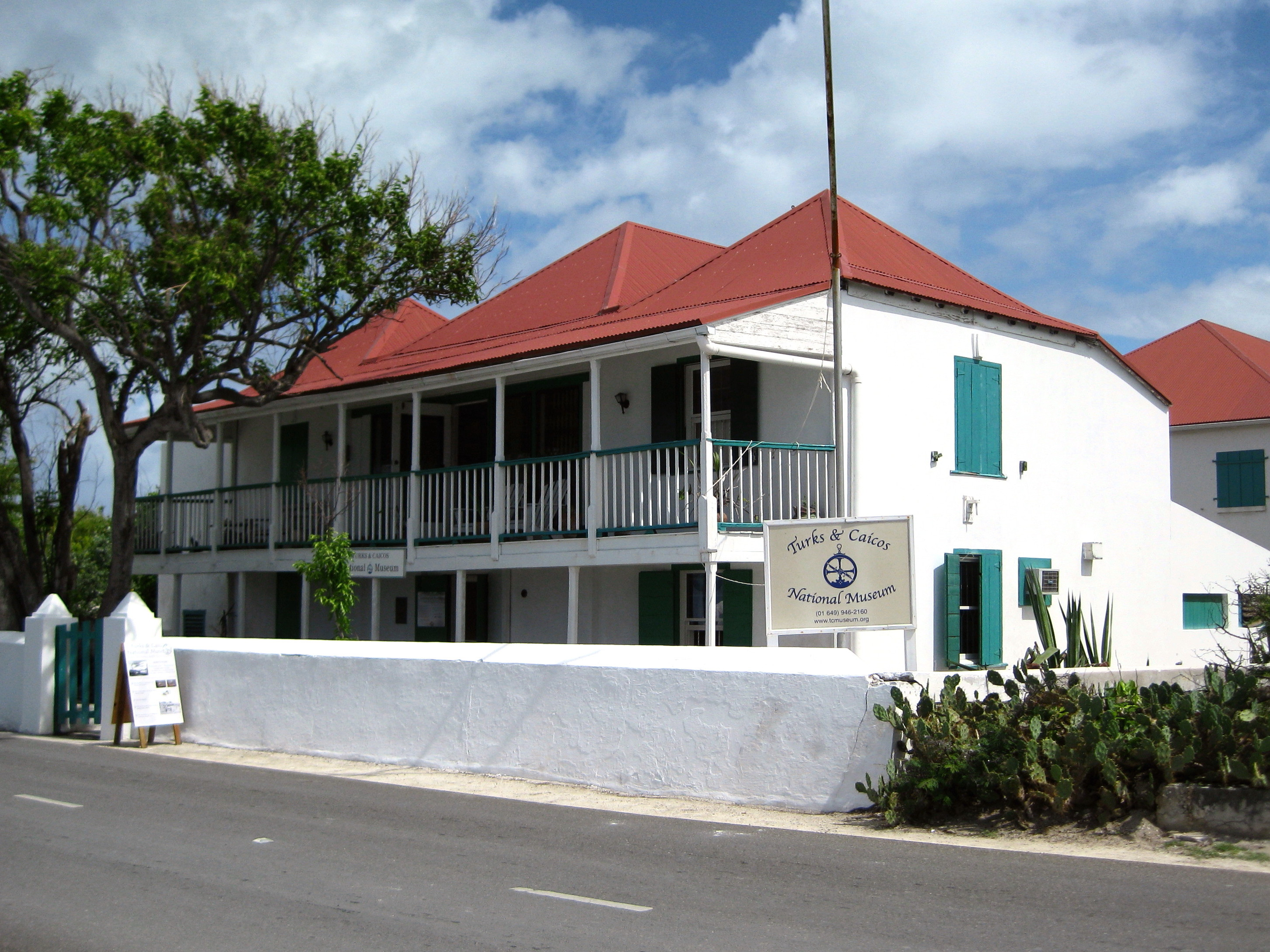
Turks & Caicos National Museum

Turks and Caicos Creole, or Caicosian Creole, is an English-based creole spoken in the Turks and Caicos Islands, a West Indian British overseas territory in the Lucayan Archipelago.

The Turks and Caicos Island Creole variety has not been thoroughly studied but is a dialect of Bahamian Creole. It is also related to Bermudian Creole as the two are reportedly highly mutually intelligible. As of 1995, the number of speakers of Turks and Caicos Islands Creole was thought to be around 10,700, although decreasing and endangered. It seems to be shifting to a variety form of Caribbean English, as Turks and Caicos Islands Creole does not have an official status. The use of African sounds and words in Caicosian Creole is similar to Gullah Geechee in South Carolina and Georgia, resembling elements of West African languages in Senegal and Sierra Leone. This is due to enslaved Africans brought to the island form South Carolina and Georgia between 1720 and 1750.

Turks and Caicos Island Creole is also influenced by Jamaican Patois—and shares many of the same words such as Aks (Ask), Dis (This), Gyal (Girl), and Mosi (Must be)—due to the fact that the Turks and Caicos Islands were formally a part of Jamaica for over 114 years (1848–1962), and share a common heritage with Jamaica. Bermudian Creole has impacted Caicosian Creole because the islands were initially settled by Bermudian salt-rakers following British colonization, and were a de facto part of Bermuda for over 126 years (1673–1799). As of 2019, the number of speakers of Caicosian Creole is approximately 34,000.

== Phrases ==
Word/phrase	Meaning
axe	ask
chile/chilen	child/children
chile	used to represent emphasis on a sentence (well chile he een tell me nuttin bout that)
een	aren't (They een goin today) or isn't (That een right) or don't (I een no nuttin bout that)
gal/gyal	girl
jumbee	spirit or ghost. Compare zombie
musse	must be
scorch	scratch
switcha/switcher	lemonade/limeade (combination of soft drink and lime/lemon juice)
vel	well (usually the 'W' and 'V' are exchanged with each other, e.g. vednesday: Wednesday, weil: veil)

== See also ==
- Bermudian Creole
- Cayman Islands English
- Jamaican Patois
- San Andrés–Providencia Creole
