= Bahamian English =

Variety of English

- Region: The Bahamas
- Ethnicity: Bahamians
- Language family: Indo-European: Germanic; West Germanic; North Sea Germanic; Anglo-Frisian; Anglic; English; Caribbean English; Bahamian English
- Early forms: Proto-Indo-European: Proto-Germanic; Old English; Middle English; Early Modern English

Language codes
- ISO 639-3: –
- Glottolog: baha1263
- IETF: en-BS

Bahamian English is the set of varieties of the English language native to the Bahamas. English is the country's official language. Bahamian dialect is the vernacular speech of the Bahamas, spoken by the majority of the population, while Standard Bahamian English is the language of the professional class, used in the media and business and also the target written language in compulsory education.

These language varieties differ based on factors like education, regional origin, socioeconomic status, and to some extent race. Due to the country's British colonial past, the standard written English for official use and education remains largely British-based with regard to grammar, spelling, and vocabulary.

Because of the Bahamas' proximity to the United States as well as US cable media, the 21st-century Bahamian media industry and younger speakers may be more influenced in their pronunciations by General American English or Black American English.

== Bahamian dialect ==
Bahamian dialect, as it is called in the Bahamas, is the first oral language of most Bahamians, resulting from intricate patterns of language contact of numerous English dialects and English-based creole languages. Bahamian dialect's classification as a variety of English, a distinct creole (or former creole) language of its own, or a diverse mixture is a matter of ongoing linguistic investigation. Additionally, regional, racial, and socioeconomic markers and differentiations exist in the country, making Bahamian English a complex set of varieties along a linguistic continuum.

The name Bahamian dialect is derived from the fact that it was originally thought to be a simple dialect of English. However, beginning with the research of Allison Shilling in the latter part of the 20th century, it began to be suggested that Bahamian dialect was in fact a creole. This view has been revised over the years, and linguists and academics, now believe that what is commonly referred to as Bahamian dialect is a more complex set of varieties along a language continuum. Generally, the term Bahamian dialect excludes Standard Bahamian English. According to a 1990s study:

Although Bahamian Dialect appears to be a dialect of English, it is actually more a creole - though it has decreolized over the years. Its overall grammar is systematically different from that of standard English and yet the two share many of the same features. This serves to enhance the illusion that the two are different dialects of the same language.

Bahamian dialect differs from English spoken around the world in its grammar, pronunciation, and lexicon. Bahamian dialect is not a formally written language; therefore, when expressed for example in text messages, it is written in a makeshift phonetic manner.

== High-register or standard spoken English ==
A minority of Bahamians speak a high-register or Standard Bahamian English that differs little in its grammar, idiom, and lexicon from other standard English varieties worldwide.

Phonology and pronunciation can differ widely and is influenced by a number of factors, including class, formal education (private vs government), national background (eg. expats), time abroad, and use of affected or learned accents (eg. certain professions). Code switching is also common.

Standard Bahamian English can be spoken with a Bahamian accent and, particularly among native Bahamians, may incorporate words, phrases, or expressions from Bahamian dialect.

== Local standard written English ==
British English is the target written language of the Bahamas. It is the language taught and learned in schools, although usually by teachers and pupils speaking otherwise speaking a more Bahamian creole variety. It is also the primary written language in business, Parliament, media and courts.

There is no central authority that prescribes official usage of English, for example, with respect to spelling, grammar, punctuation or style. However, local written English tends to favour British English spellings, eg. colour, defence, realise, programme, licence, catalogue, centre.

The dd/mm/yyy date format is generally, although not religiously, used in the Bahamas, as is the 12-hour clock.

Generally, the imperial system of measurements is used in the country, eg, to measure distances, weight, and heights. However, the metric system is also used in schools, eg, in science.

== Pronunciation ==
Not all Bahamians have the same accent, as the level of cultivation of every speaker's accent differs and is influenced by region and socioeconomic factors.

The phonology of Bahamian English is believed to be derived from those of Bermudian English, Canadian English, Cockney English, RP, Scottish English, Black American English, and Gullah. The English accent of both black and white Bahamians is traditionally non-rhotic, due to being British-influenced, but often now rhotic among some younger speakers through American influences.

Bahamian vowel phonetics are basically shared with both General American English and British Received Pronunciation, except the following may be distinct:

Vowels
Wikipedia diaphoneme	Bahamian; English	Example words
/æ/	[ä]	bath, man, trap
/ɑː/	[ɑ]	blah, father
/ɒ/	[ɑ]	bother, lot, wasp
/ɒ/	[ɑː] (lower class), [ɔː] (higher class)	dog, loss, cloth
/ɔː/	[ɑː] (lower class), [ɔː] (higher class)	bought, taught, saw
/aɪ/	[äː] (Black), [äi] or [ʌɪ] (White)	ride, shine, try
/aɪ/	[äi], [ʌɪ] (also White)	bright, dice, pike
/aʊ/	[aː, ɑɔ] (Black), [aɛ, aø] (White)	now, ouch, scout
/eɪ/	[eɪ > eː]	lake, paid, rein
/ɔɪ/	[əi, ɔi]	boy, choice, moist
/oʊ/	[ou > oː] (Black), [ɵu] (White)	goat, oh, show
Vowels followed by /r/
/ɑːr/	[ɑ̈ː]	barn, car, park
/ɪər/	[eᴈ]	fear, peer, tier
/ɛər/	[eᴈ]	bare, bear, there
/ɜːr/	[ɜː], [əi] (also Black)	burn, first, herd
/ɔːr/	[oᴈ]	hoarse, horse, poor

== Vocabulary ==
In 1982, Holm and Shilling released a 228 page Dictionary of Bahamian English containing over 5,000 words, including words both familiar to other English speakers as well as purely Bahamian terms. In addition to British and American English influences, due to the country's colonial past, some vocabulary is derived from West African languages and Spanish influences. Amongst British sources, Holm found a wide variety of influences, with 43% of British dialect words in Bahamian English coming from Scotland and the North Country, 14% from Ireland and 11% from the West Country.

Some distinctive Bahamianisms include:

- Asue or asue draw - a kind of collective saving scheme, derived from Yoruba.
- Bey – supposed to mean "boy", but can also refer to any person. It can also be used as an imperative command to make somebody pay attention to a point.
- Biggety (adjective) - bold or loud.
- Big eye (adjective) - greedy
- Big-up (adjective) - pregnant.
- Boonggy (noun) - the hindquarters area. As a verb, it refers to anal penetration.
- Broughtupcy (noun) – the way that someone is raised. "No broughtupcy" can also be used as an adjective, meaning "bad-mannered".
- Conchy Joe (noun) - can refer to either a white native/longtime resident of the Bahamas or a cocktail.
- Cut eye (verb) - to give somebody a dirty look.
- Cut one's hip (verb) - to give somebody a beating. The noun "cut-hip" refers to a beating that is given in this act.
- Frowsy (adjective) - foul-smelling, often in an extreme sense.
- Grabalishous (adjective) - greedy.
- Jam up (adjective) - crowded.
- Jitney (noun) - a city bus.
- Jook (verb) - to poke or stab.
- Jungle-ess (noun) - a loud, uncouth and fiesty woman.
- Mash up (verb) - to break or destroy something.
- Muddo or muddasick (interjection) – an expression used to represent excitement, surprise, or shock.
- Mussy - a contraction of "must be", often used to mean only the former.
- Potcake (noun) - a dog of multiple breeds.
- Reef barrier (noun) - the main reef of a coral reef system.
- Reef platform (noun) - the top of a coral reef, especially a flat one.
- Root title (noun) - title history (of an estate).
- Sip sip (noun) - gossip.
- Slam bam (noun) - a sausage and bread sandwich.
- Sometimey (adjective) - moody.
- Stench (verb) - to be stubborn.
- Sweetheartin' (verb) - to cheat on one's spouse.
- Switcha (noun) - lemonade.
- Tennis - sneakers, trainers, runners; cf tennis shoes.
- Tief (verb) - thief.
- Tingum - used to refer to a person or thing with a name that cannot be easily recalled by the speaker. Can also be represented with "t'ing".
- Totin' news (verb) - to spread gossip.
- Yinna (pronoun) - you (plural).

=== British vs American English ===
Bahamian English has also come under the influence of American English due to a boost in tourism after the country gained independence, along with the resulting diffusion of American media. With its historical position as a former British colony but its proximity to the United States, Bahamian English tends to favour some British English terms, some American English terms, and also use a combination of both. For example:

Words shared with American English	Words shared with British English
gasoline	socket
cell phone	maths
sweet pepper	
sidewalk	
candy	
chips	
ground beef	
hood, trunk, windscreen	bumper
parking lot	car park
trash	
sweater	
stroller, baby carriage	pram
cookie	biscuit
pants	
nursery	kindergarten
liquid paper	
aluminum	
vacation	
