= List of macaronic languages =

The following is a list of macaronic languages.

- English
  - Amideutsch (American English/German) (see Denglisch)
  - Bahasa Rojak and Manglish (Malay/various Chinese dialects/Tamil/English)
  - Chinglish (Chinese/American English)
  - Czenglish (Czech/English)
  - Danglish (Danish/English)
  - Denglisch (German/British English)
  - Dunglish (Dutch/British English)
  - Engrish (East Asian/English)
  - Europanto (German/French/Spanish/Italian/English)
  - Franglais = Frenglish (Canadian English/Canadian French)
  - Heblish (Hebrew/English)
  - Hinglish (Hindi/English)
  - Hunglish (Hungarian/English)
  - Japlish (Japanese/American English)
  - Itanglish (Italian/English)
  - Llanito (English/Andalusian Spanish)
  - Kanglish (Kannada/English)
  - Maltenglish (Maltese/English)
  - Poglish (Polish/English)
  - Porglish (Brazilian Portuguese/American English)
  - Runglish (Russian/English)
  - Siculish (Sicilian/English)
  - Singlish (Singaporean English)
  - Senkyoshigo (American English, Japanese)
  - South Jakarta/Fart language (Indonesian/English)
  - Spanglish (Mexican Spanish/American English)
  - Swenglish (Swedish/British English)
  - Taglish (Tagalog/English)
  - Tinglish (Thai/English)
  - Urdish (Urdu/English)
  - Yinglish (Yiddish/English)
- German
  - Hunsrik (German/Brazilian Portuguese)
- Russian
  - Surzhyk (Ukrainian/Russian)
  - Trasianka (Belarusian/Russian)
- Spanish
  - Alemañol (German/Spanish)
  - Catañol (Catalan/Spanish)
  - Castrapo (Galician/Spanish)
  - Cocoliche (Rioplatense Spanish/Italian)
  - Frañol/Frespañol = Frespanish (French-Spanish)
  - Japoñol (Japanese/Spanish)
  - Portuñol/Portunhol (Brazilian Portuguese/Spanish)
- Other
  - Armeno-Turkish (lingua franca vernacular Turkish in the Ottoman Empire)

== See also ==
- Macaronic language
- List of lishes
- Pidgin
- List of creole languages
- Catañol
- Lagunen-deutsch
