= List of lishes =

Since the 1930s English has created numerous portmanteau words using the word English as the second element. These refer to varieties of English that are heavily influenced by other languages or that are typical of speakers from a certain country or region. The term can mean a type of English heavily influenced by another language (typically the speaker's L1) in accent, lexis, syntax, etc., or to the practice of code-switching between languages.

In some cases, the word refers to the use of the Latin alphabet to write languages that use a different script, especially common on computer platforms that only allow Latin input such as online chat, social networks, emails and SMS.

The practice of forming new words in this way has become increasingly popular since the 1990s. James Lambert lists 510 such terms, known as "lishes", with many of which sourced from user-generated wikis.

The following is a list of lishes that have Wikipedia pages.

== Common lishes ==
- Arablish - a mixture of Arabic and English
- Banglish
- Bislish – a mixture of Visayan and English
- Brunei English
- Chinglish – a mixture of Chinese and English; Chinese English
- Czenglish – a mixture of Czech and English
- Danglish – a mixture of Danish and English
- Denglisch – a mixture of German and English; Germlish
- Dunglish – a mixture of Dutch and English
- Espanglish = Spanglish
- Finglish – a mixture of Finnish and English
- Frenglish – a mixture of French and English; Franglais
- Greeklish – a mixture of Greek and English
- Heblish – a mixture of Hebrew and English, also commonly known as hebrish
- Hinglish – a mixture of Hindi and English
- Hunglish – a mixture of Hungarian and English
- Itanglese – a mixture of Italian and English; Itanglese
- Wasei-eigo – a mixture of Japanese and English; Wasei-eigo (not to be confused with Engrish)
- Kanglish – a mixture of Kannada and English
- Konglish – a mixture of Korean and English
- Maltenglish – a mixture of Maltese and English
- Manglish – a mixture of Malay and English
- Namlish – Namibian English
- Nepalese English – a mixture of Nepali and English
- Nihonglish – a mixture of Japanese and English; Janglish
- Paklish – Pakistani English
- Pinglish (disambiguation) – Pakistani English; Palestine English; Persian English; Polish English; Punjabi English
- Ponglish - a mixture of Polish and English
- Porglish - a mixture of Portuguese and English
- Runglish - a mixture of Russian and English
- Siculish - a mixture of Sicilian and English
- Singlish - Colloquial Singaporean English
- Simlish - Fictional Language in The Sims Video game series
- Spanglish - a mixture of Spanish and English
- Swenglish - a mixture of Swedish and English
- Taglish - a mixture of Tagalog and English
- Tanglish - a mixture of Tamil and English
- Tenglish - a mixture of Telugu and English
- Tinglish - a mixture of Thai and English
- Uglish - Ugandan English
- Vietglish - a mixture of Vietnamese and English
- Wenglish - a mixture of Welsh and English; Welsh English
- Yinglish - a mixture of Yiddish and English

== See also ==
- List of dialects of English
- List of portmanteaus
