= Chinglish =

English that is influenced by a Chinese language

- Chinese English, China English, Engrish, Sinicized English
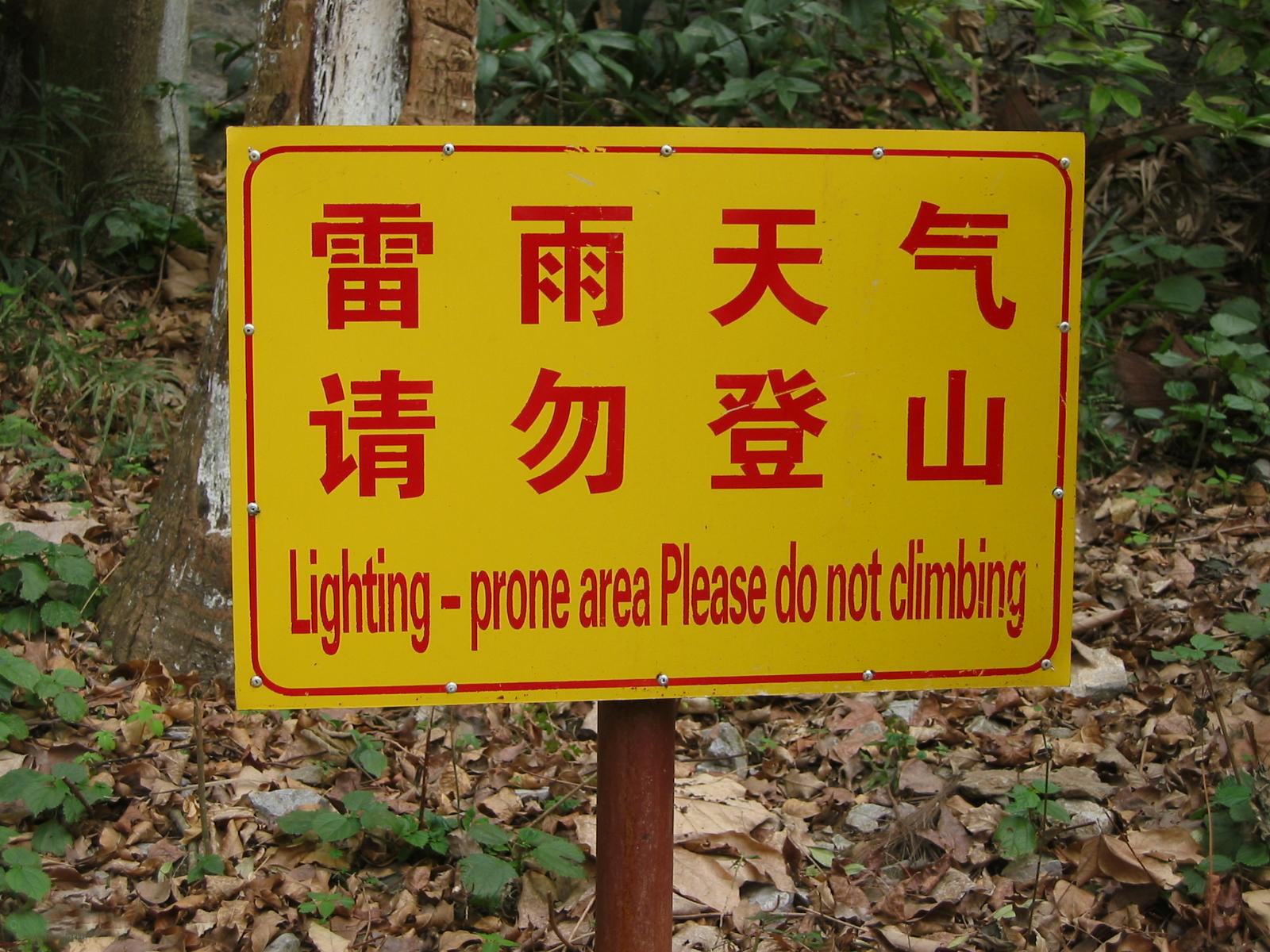
- A 2007 warning sign in Guilin states in Chinese: "(When there are) thunderstorms / Please do not climb the mountain."
- Native to: PRC and ROC
- Region: East Asia
- Language family: Indo-European: Germanic; West Germanic; Ingvaeonic; Anglo–Frisian; Anglic; English; Chinglish
- Early forms: Old English: Middle English; Early Modern English
- Writing system: Latin (English alphabet)

Language codes
- ISO 639-3: –
- Map of China. Territory controlled by the People's Republic of China shown in dark green; territory claimed but not controlled is shown in light green.

Chinglish
- Traditional Chinese: 中式英文
- Simplified Chinese: 中式英文
- Literal meaning: Chinese-style English
Transcriptions
Standard Mandarin
- Hanyu Pinyin: zhōng shì yīngwén

Chinglish (also known as Chinese English) is spoken or written English that is either influenced by or poorly translated from the Chinese language. In South China (particularly the Lingnan region), the term "Chinglish" refers mainly to code-mixing or code-switching of Mandarin or other dialectal varieties of Chinese, while in the rest of Mainland China it refers to English influenced by the tones, intonations and lexicons. Other terms used to describe the phenomenon include "China English", "Engrish" and "Sinicized English". The degree to which a Chinese variety of English exists or can be considered legitimate is still up for debate.

This term is commonly applied to grammatically wrong or nonsensical English expressions in Chinese contexts by second language speakers, typically due to mispellings, mispronunciations, bad synonym usage, rigid machine translations or unprofessional literal translations, and may have pejorative or deprecating connotations when used by native English speakers. However, Chinglish is also used to convey parody and humour in translation, and has cultural impact in sketch comedy, movies, television shows and other aspect of daily life when it is used intentionally as a form of self-expression or as mocking slangs among Chinese speakers, playing a significant role in shaping their sense of identity.

== Terminology ==
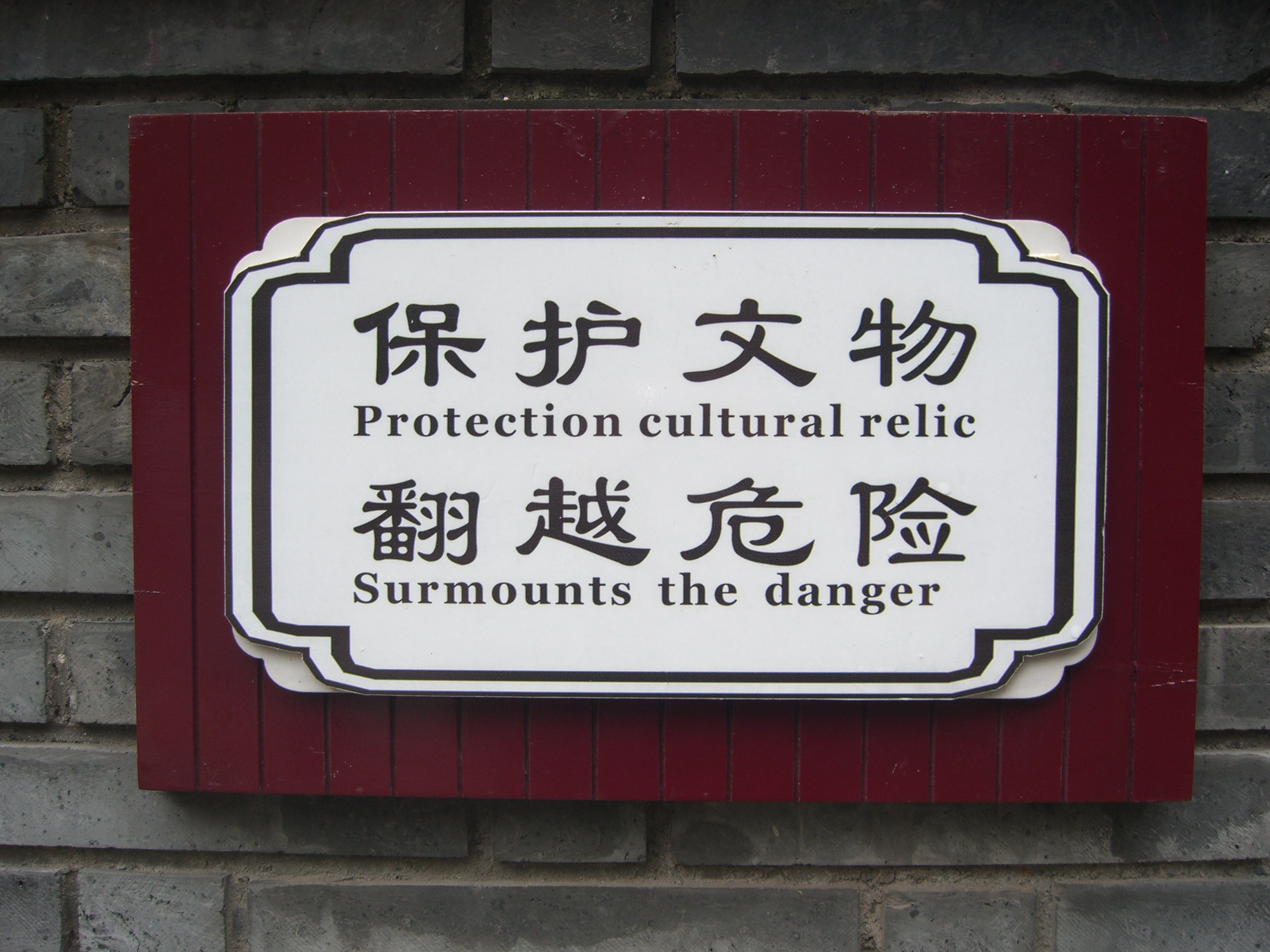
A 2010 sign on the wall surrounding the Tiger Hill Pagoda warning tourists not to climb up. lit. 'Protect cultural heritages / climbing [is] dangerous.'

The English word Chinglish is a portmanteau of Chinese and English. The Chinese equivalent is Zhōngshì Yīngyǔ (simplified Chinese: 中式英语; traditional Chinese: 中式英語; lit. 'Chinese-style English').

Chinglish can be compared with other interlanguage varieties of English, such as Britalian (from Italian), Czenglish (from Czech), Denglisch (German), Dunglish (Dutch), Franglais (French), Greeklish (Greek), Manglish (Malaysia), Runglish (Russian), Spanglish (Spanish), Swenglish (Swedish), Hunglish (Hungarian), Hebrish (Hebrew), Engrish (Japanese), Hinglish (Hindi), Konglish (Korean), Taglish (Tagalog), Bislish (Visayan), Singlish (in Singapore), Ponglish (Polish) and Tinglish (Thai).

The Oxford English Dictionary defines the noun and adjective.

Chinglish, n. and a. colloq. (freq. depreciative). Brit. /ˈtʃɪŋglɪʃ/, U.S. /ˈtʃɪŋ(g)lɪʃ/. Forms: 19– Chinglish, 19– Chenglish [rare]. [Blend of Chinese n. and English n. Compare earlier Japlish n., Spanglish n. Compare also Hinglish n.2, Singlish n.2]

A. n. A mixture of Chinese and English; esp. a variety of English used by speakers of Chinese or in a bilingual Chinese and English context, typically incorporating some Chinese vocabulary or constructions, or English terms specific to a Chinese context. Also: the vocabulary of, or an individual word from, such a variety. Cf. Singlish n.2

B adj. Of or relating to Chinglish; expressed in Chinglish.

This dictionary cites the earliest recorded usage of Chinglish (noted as a jocular term) in 1957 and of Chinese English in 1857. However, Chinglish has been found to date from as early as 1936, making it one of the earliest portmanteau words for a hybrid variety of English. Other colloquial portmanteau words for Chinese English include: Chenglish (recorded from 1979), Chinlish (1996), Chinenglish (1997), Changlish (2000) and Chinelish (2006).

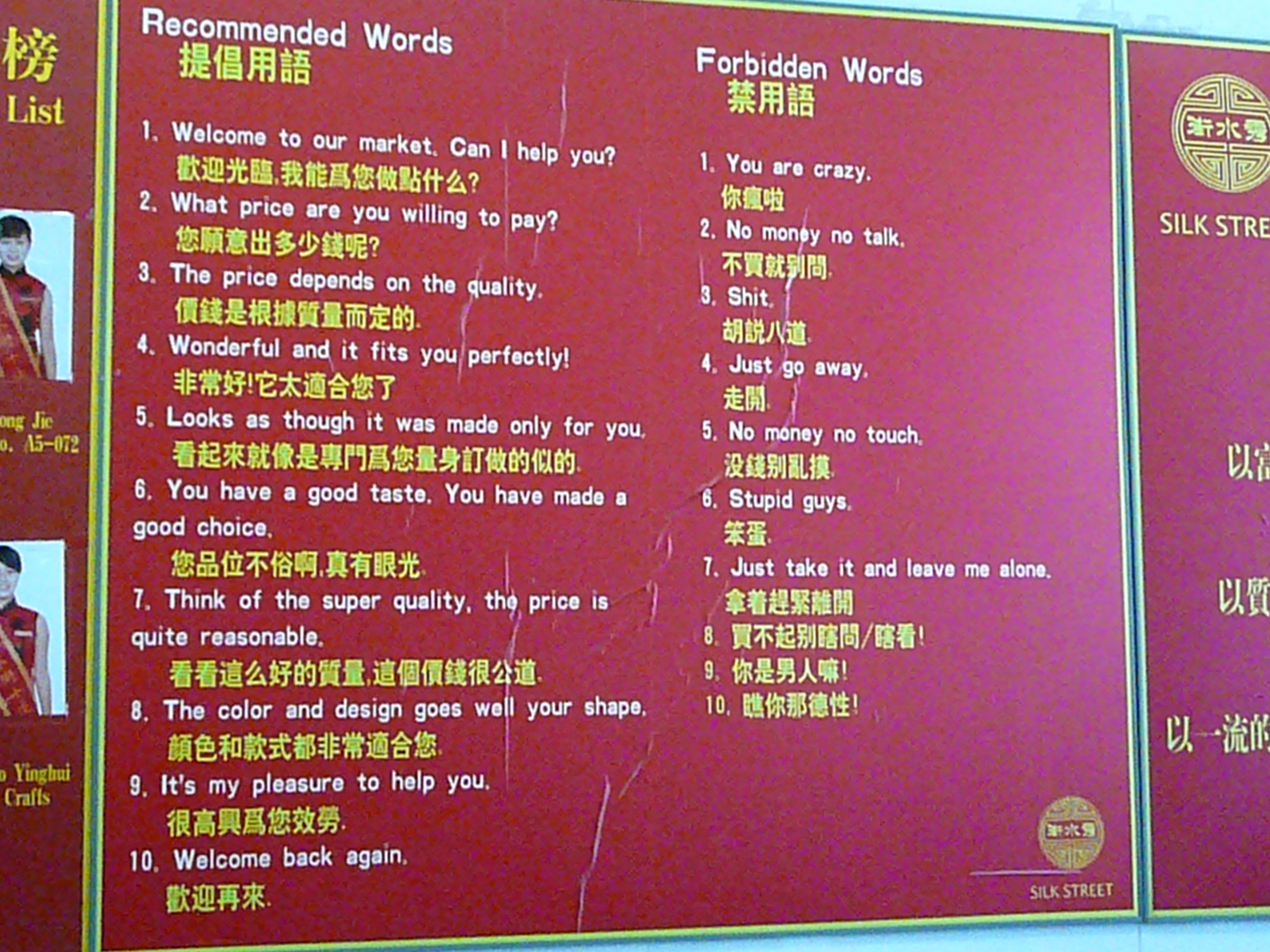
A 2007 sign from Beijing's Silk Street, giving translations of common English phrases vendors may use when serving English speaking customers, as well as phrases advised against.

Chinglish commonly refers to a mixture of English with Modern Standard Mandarin, but it occasionally refers to mixtures with Cantonese, Shanghainese and Taiwanese Hokkien.

Chinglish contrasts with some related terms. Chinese Pidgin English was a lingua franca that originated in the 17th century. Zhonglish, a term for Chinese influenced by English, is a portmanteau of Zhōngwén (中文; 'Chinese language') and "English".

Some peculiar Chinese English cannot be labeled Chinglish because it is grammatically correct, and Victor Mair calls this emerging dialect "Xinhua English or New China News English", based on the Xinhua News Agency. Take for instance, this headline: "China lodges solemn representation over Japan's permission for Rebiya Kadeer's visit". This unusual English phrase literally translates the original Chinese tíchū yánzhèng jiāoshè (提出嚴正交涉; 'lodge solemn representation'), combining tíchū "put forward; raise; pose bring up", yánzhèng "serious; stern; unyielding; solemn", and jiāoshè "mutual relations; negotiation; representation". "Pure Chinese" is an odd English locution in a Web advertisement: "孔子学院/ CONFUCIUS INSTITUTE/ Teach you pure Chinese." This Kǒngzǐ Xuéyuàn (孔子学院) is Chinese for the Confucius Institute, but Mair notes that "pure Chinese" curiously implies "impure Chinese".

One author divides Chinglish into "instrumental" and "ornamental" categories. "Instrumental Chinglish is actually intended to convey information to English speakers. Ornamental Chinglish is born of the fact that English is the lingua franca of coolness. Meaning aside, any combination of roman letters elevates a commodity – khaki pants, toilet paper, potato chips – to a higher plane of chic by suggesting that the product is geared toward an international audience."

== History ==
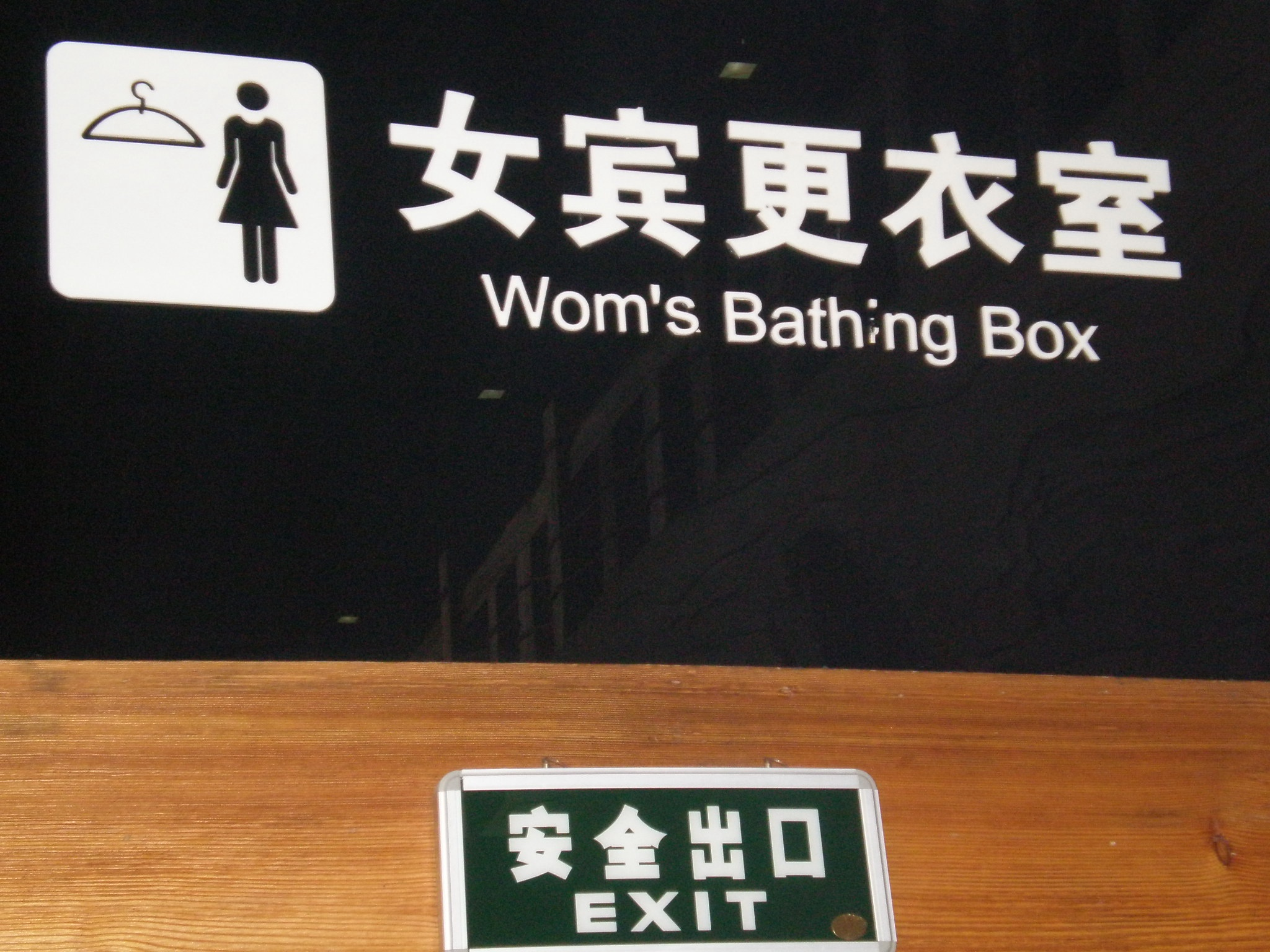
A 2013 sign on a ladies' changing room, reading "Wom's Bathing Box".

English first arrived in China in 1637, when British traders reached Hong Kong, Macau and Guangzhou (Canton). In the 17th century, Chinese Pidgin English originated as a lingua franca for trade between British people and mostly Cantonese-speaking Chinese people. This proto-Chinglish term "pidgin" originated as a Chinese mispronunciation of the English word "business". Following the First and Second Opium War between 1839 and 1842, Pidgin English spread north to Shanghai and other treaty ports. Pidgin usage began to decline in the late 19th century when Chinese and missionary schools began teaching Standard English. In 1982, the People's Republic of China made English the main foreign language in education. The spelling of words in Chinese education follows British English standards, while the pronunciation in the tape recording adheres to American English. Current estimates for the number of English learners in China range from 300 to 500 million.

Chinglish may have influenced some English expressions that are "calques" or "loan translations" from Chinese Pidgin English, for instance, "lose face" derives from diūliǎn 丟脸; 'lose face', 'be humiliated'. Some sources claim "long time no see" is a Chinglish calque from hǎojiǔbújiàn 好久不见; 'long time no see'. More reliable references note this jocular American English phrase "used as a greeting after prolonged separation" was first recorded in 1900 for a Native American's speech, and thus more likely derives from American Indian Pidgin English.

Chinese officials carried out campaigns to reduce Chinglish in preparation for the 2008 Summer Olympics in Beijing and the Expo 2010 in Shanghai.

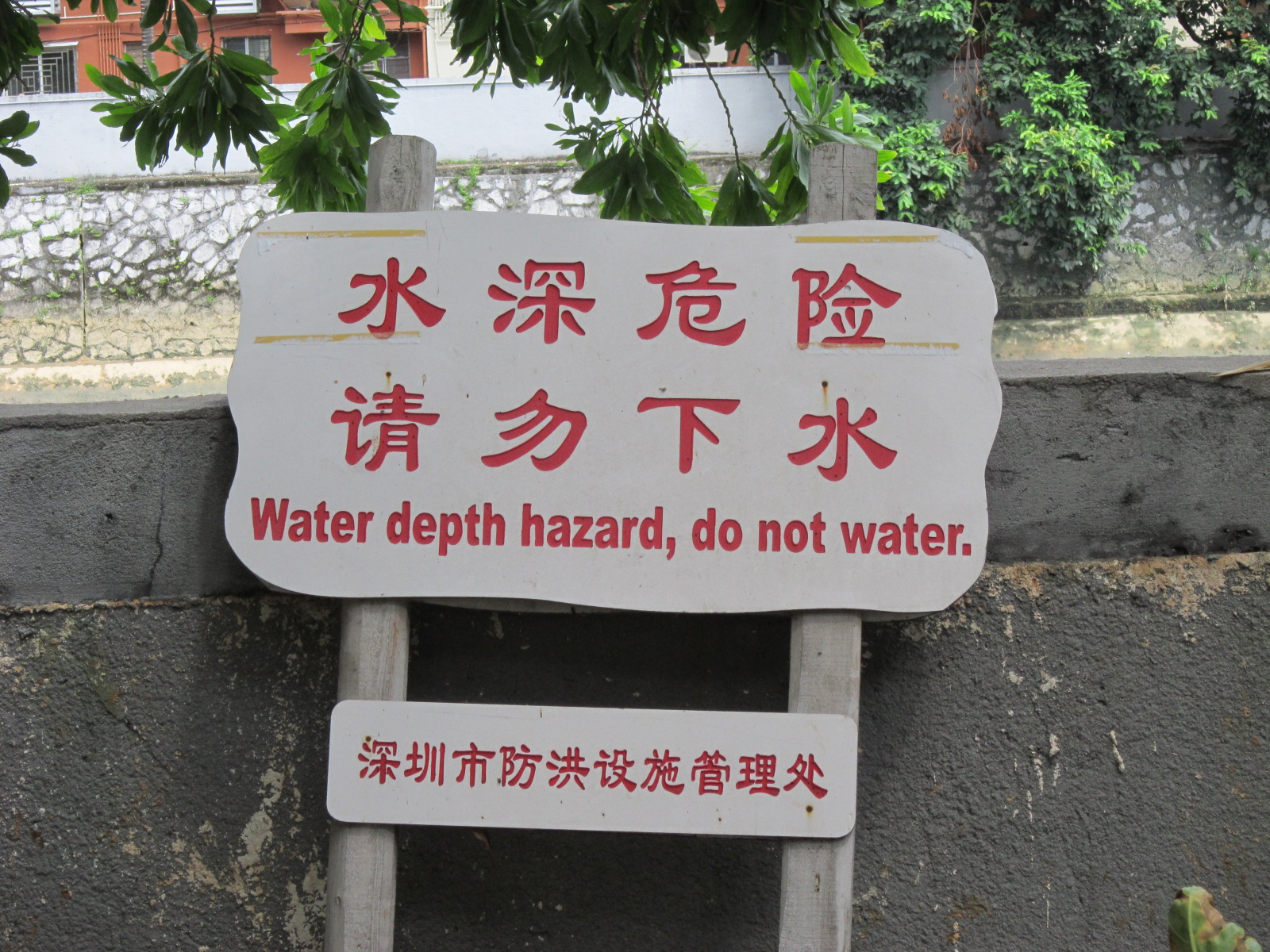
A 2013 warning sign in Shenzhen, Guangdong in Chinese: "Danger, deep water / no swimming."

Soon after Beijing was awarded the 2008 Summer Olympics in 2001, the Beijing Tourism Bureau established a tipster hotline for Chinglish errors on signs, such as emergency exits at the Beijing Capital International Airport reading "No entry on peacetime". In 2007, the Beijing Speaks Foreign Languages Program (BSFLP) reported they had, "worked out 4,624 pieces of standard English translations to substitute the Chinglish ones on signs around the city", for instance, "Be careful, road slippery" instead of "To take notice of safe: The slippery are very crafty." BSFLP chairperson Chen Lin said, "We want everything to be correct. Grammar, words, culture, everything. Beijing will have thousands of visitors coming. We don't want anyone laughing at us." Reporting from Beijing, Ben Macintyre lamented the loss of signs like "Show Mercy to the Slender Grass" because, "many of the best examples of Chinglish are delightful, reflecting the inventiveness that results when two such different languages collide". The Global Language Monitor doubted that Beijing's attempt to eradicate Chinglish could succeed, noting that "attempting to map a precise ideogram to any particular word in the million-word English lexicon is a nearly impossible task", and pointing out that the Games' official website contained the phrase "we share the charm and joy of the Olympic Games", claiming that it was using "charm" as a transitive verb rather than a noun.

In Shanghai, for Expo 2010, a similar effort was made to replace Chinglish signs. A New York Times article by Andrew Jacobs reported on accomplishments by the Shanghai Commission for the Management of Language Use. "Fortified by an army of 600 volunteers and a politburo of adroit English speakers, the commission has fixed more than 10,000 public signs (farewell "Teliot" and "urine district"), rewritten English-language historical placards and helped hundreds of restaurants recast offerings." James Fallows attributed many Shanghai Chinglish errors to "rote reliance on dictionaries or translation software", citing a bilingual sign reading "餐厅 Translate server error" (cāntīng; 餐厅 means "dining room; restaurant"). While conceding that "there's something undeniably Colonel Blimp-ish in making fun of the locals for their flawed command of your own mother tongue", Fallows observed a Shanghai museum with "Three Georges Exhibit" banners advertising a Three Gorges Dam exhibit, and wrote, "it truly is bizarre that so many organizations in China are willing to chisel English translations into stone, paint them on signs, print them on business cards, and expose them permanently to the world without making any effort to check whether they are right." On a Chinese airplane, Fallows was given a wet wipe labeled "Wet turban needless wash", translating miǎn xǐ shī jīn (免洗湿巾; 'wash-free moist towel'). Shanghai's Luwan District published a controversial "Bilingual Instruction of Luwan District for Expo" phrasebook with English terms and Chinese characters approximating pronunciation: "Good morning! (古得猫宁)" [pronounced gǔ dé māo níng] (which could be literally translated as "ancient cat tranquility") and "I'm sorry (爱么搔瑞)" [ài me saō ruì] (which is nonsensical).

Chinglish is pervasive in present-day China "on public notices in parks and at tourist sites, on shop names and in their slogans, in product advertisements and on packages, in hotel names and literature, in restaurant names and on menus, at airports, railway stations and in taxis, on street and highway signs – even in official tourist literature."

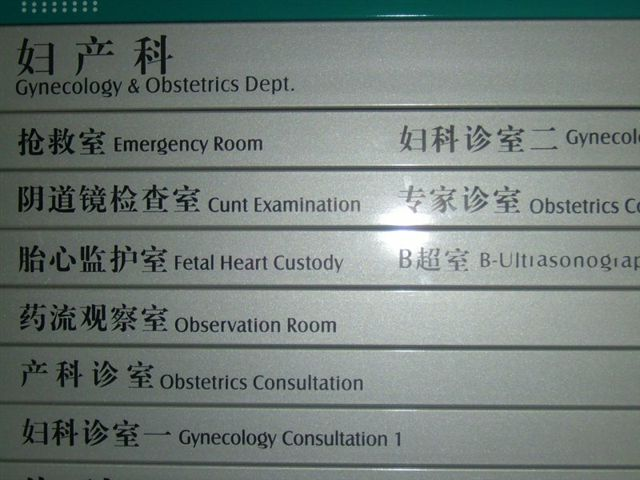
A 2014 sign in a Chinese hospital uses the term "cunt examination" for "vulvar examination".

The Global Language Monitor predicts Chinglish will thrive, and estimates that roughly 20 percent of new English words derive from Chinglish, for instance, shanzhai (山寨; 'mountain stronghold', 'mountain village') meaning "counterfeit consumer goods; things done in parody" — Huang Youyi, president of the China Internet Information Center, predicts that linguistic purism could be damaged by popular Chinese words of English origin (such as OK and LOL). "If we do not pay attention and we do not take measures to stop Chinese mingling with English, Chinese will no longer be a pure language in a couple of years."

Specifying Chinglish to mean "Chinese words literally translated into English", an experiment in linguistic clarity conducted by Han and Ginsberg (2001) found that mathematical terms are more readily understandable in Chinglish than English. English words for mathematics typically have Greek and Latin roots, while corresponding Chinese words are usually translations of neologisms from Western languages; thus quadrilateral (from Latin quadri- "four" and latus "sided") is generally less informative than Chinese sìbiānxíng 四边形; 'four-side-shape'). For example, compare the semantic clarity of English axiom, Chinese gōnglǐ 公理, and Chinglish (literal translation) "universal-principle"; median, zhōngshù 中数, and "centre-number"; or trapezoid, tīxíng 梯形, and "ladder-figure". The study involved three groups of mathematics teachers who rated the clarity of 71 common mathematical terms. Group 1 with native speakers of Chinese judged 61% of the Chinese terms as clear; Group 2 with native speakers of English judged 45% of the English terms as clear. Group 3 with English-speaking teachers (both native and nonnative speakers) judged the comparative clarity of English and Chinglish word pairs: more clear for 42.3% of the Chinglish and 5.6% of the English, equally clear for 25.4% of the Chinglish-English pairs, and neither clear for 19.7%.

In 2017, the Government of the People's Republic of China introduced the national standard for its English translations to replace Chinglish. This took effect on 1 December of that year.

== Features ==
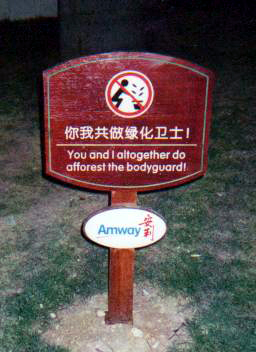
A 2007 sign in Fujian advising people not to step on the grass: "Together let's protect the greenery."

Chinglish is the combination of the Chinese culture and the English language. China English has linguistic characteristics that are different from the normative English in all linguistic levels, including phonology, lexicon, syntax, and discourse.

At the phonological level, Chinglish does not differentiate between various vowel qualities because they don't exist in Chinese. As a result, there is no contrast between the two sounds for Chinglish speakers. For example, cheap and chip would be the same pronunciation. Another phonological feature is that speakers are unaware of the "graduation" of words which are said in different tones depending on the context. The word for is stressed and said differently in the phrases "what is it for?" and "this is for you." To a Chinglish speaker, the two are the same. Chinglish speakers use Chinese phonological units to speak English, and retain the syllable timing of Chinese in place of the stress timing of English which together gives them a notable accent.

At the lexical level, China English manifests itself through many ways such as transliteration and loan translations. Transliteration has brought many interesting words and expressions from the Chinese language into English. Speakers are able to merge the two because of pinyin, a Latin alphabet used to write Chinese. In loan translations, Chinese words have been translated directly into English. This phenomenon can be found in a lot of compound words like red bean, bean curd, and teacup. The other way that loan translations are made is when speakers translate Chinese terms into English. These words come from the Chinese culture and are ideas, thoughts, or expressions that do not exist in English. For example, spring rolls would otherwise not have meaning in English if not for Chinglish speakers making it a loan translation to describe the food. In addition, speakers use subordinate conjunctions differently and also exhibit copula absence in their speech. Examples include "Because I am ill, so I can't go to school" and "The dress beautiful."

As Chinese grammar does not distinguish between definite and indefinite articles, Chinese speakers struggle with when to use or not use the English definite article the.

At the syntactic level, Chinese thinking has influenced Chinglish speakers to utilize a different sequence and structure to make sentences. For English speakers, a common sequence is subject → predicate → object → adverbial ("John entered the room quietly"). On the other hand, the Chinese sequence is subject → adverbial → predicate → object ("Lijing quiet enter room"). Chinese speakers tend to leave the most important information (the topic) at the end of the sentence, while English speakers present it at the start.

Linguists and language teachers employ error analysis to fathom Chinglish. Liu et al. list four characteristic features of Chinglish mistranslations,

- Cultural meanings. The English idiom "work like a horse" means "work hard", but in China horses are rarely used as draft animals and the equivalent Chinese expression uses niú 牛 "cattle".
- Problems of direct translation. Some Chinglish menus translate dòufu 豆腐 as "bean curd", which "sounds very unappetizing" to English speakers, instead of "tofu".
- Wordiness. Unnecessary words and convoluted sentences are hallmarks of Chinglish translation. For example, the Civil Aviation Administration of China announced, "CAAC has decided to start the business of advance booking and ticketing", which could simply say "CAAC now accepts advance booking and ticketing."
- Wrong word order. A host in Shenyang toasted a group of foreign investors with "Up your bottoms!" instead of "Bottoms up!"

Chinglish reflects the influence of Chinese syntax and grammar. For instance, Chinese verbs are not necessarily conjugated and there is no equivalent article for English "the", both of which can create awkward translations.

== Causes ==
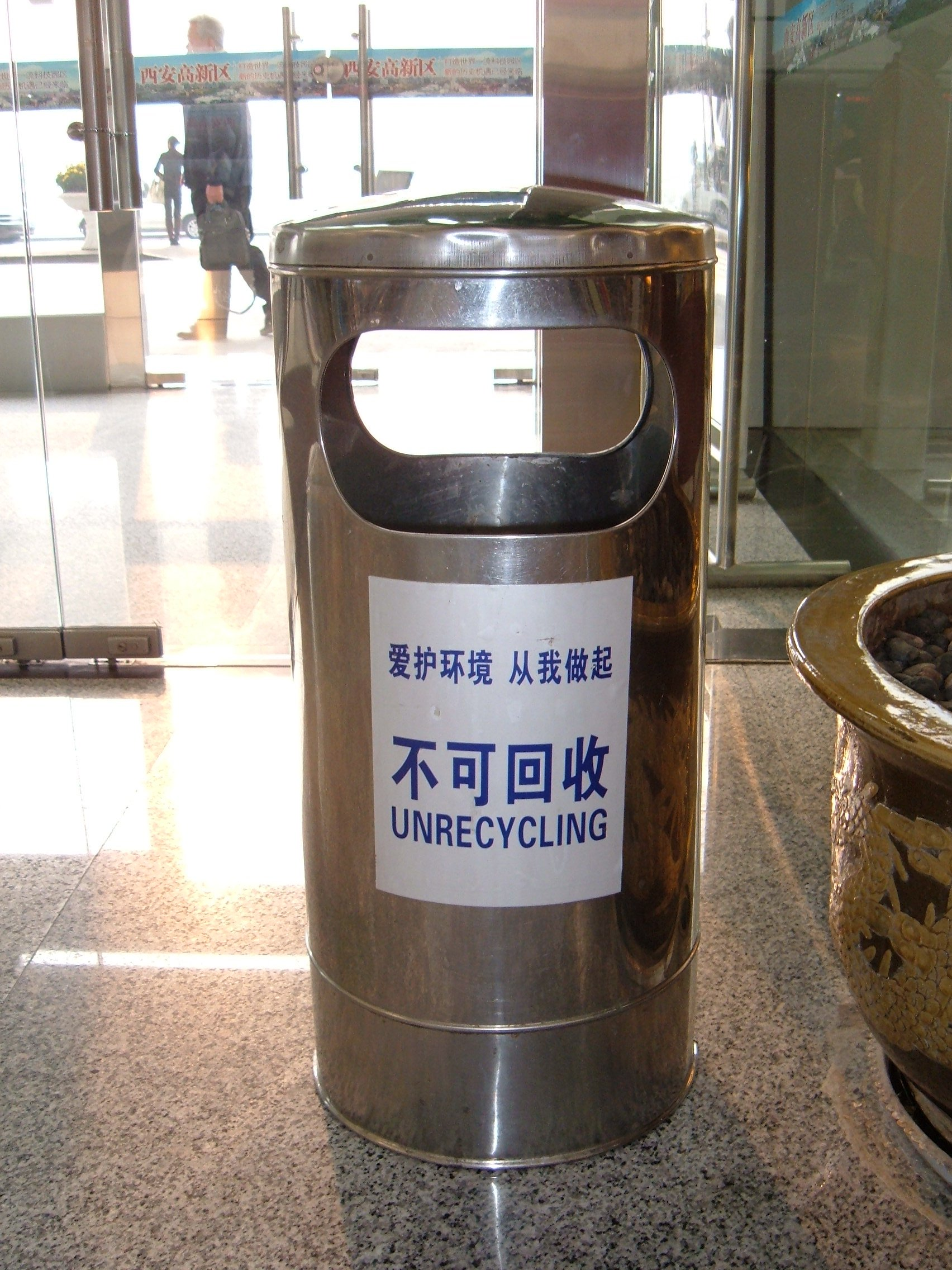
A 2007 sign on a trash bin for non-recyclable waste at the Xi'an Xianyang International Airport.

Chinglish has various causes, most commonly erroneous Chinese dictionaries, translation software, and incorrect English as a foreign language textbooks. Other causes include misspelling, mediocre English-language teaching, sloppy translation, and reliance on outdated translation technology. Liu, Feather and Qian warn that

today's English-language publishers and teachers in China are passing on obsolete translations and incorrect rules of language to students. In turn, Chinglish gets duplicated across society, particularly now during today's period of rapid opening to the outside world and the widespread use of English. The resultant flood of Chinglish will perpetuate unless it is corrected now.

Common causes include:

- Lack of inclusion of native English speakers or professional translators in the translation or editing process
- Word-for-word dictionary translation: rigidly substituting Chinese words with English ones from dictionaries, without considering the impact of polysemy or connotation
- Use of machine translation without post-editing or proofreading
- Competently translated text which has been subsequently edited by non-native speakers
- Linguistic differences and mother tongue interference
- Different thinking patterns and culture, which can manifest as idioms or euphemisms that an English speaker will find unfamiliar if translated literally (add oil for 'good luck'), overly formal or casual speech in the wrong context, use of vulgar terminology that an English speaker may find offensive or humorous in a professional setting, overuse of terms like "multiple" when English speakers would use a plural, etc.
- Outdated Chinese-English dictionaries and textbook-style English
- Mediocre English-language teaching and lack of English-language environment, manifesting as ESL students having little opportunities to practice the language, staff translators showing little interest in reading literature in the language, an abundance of students taking rudimentary English classes as an academic requirement with no interest in improving their skills, a lack of practice writing in English, etc.
- Literally translating terms that Westerners would already be familiar with, such as translating "dou fu" (豆腐) as "bean curd" when most English speakers are familiar with the Japanese calque of the Chinese "dou fu", "tofu".

== Vocabulary ==
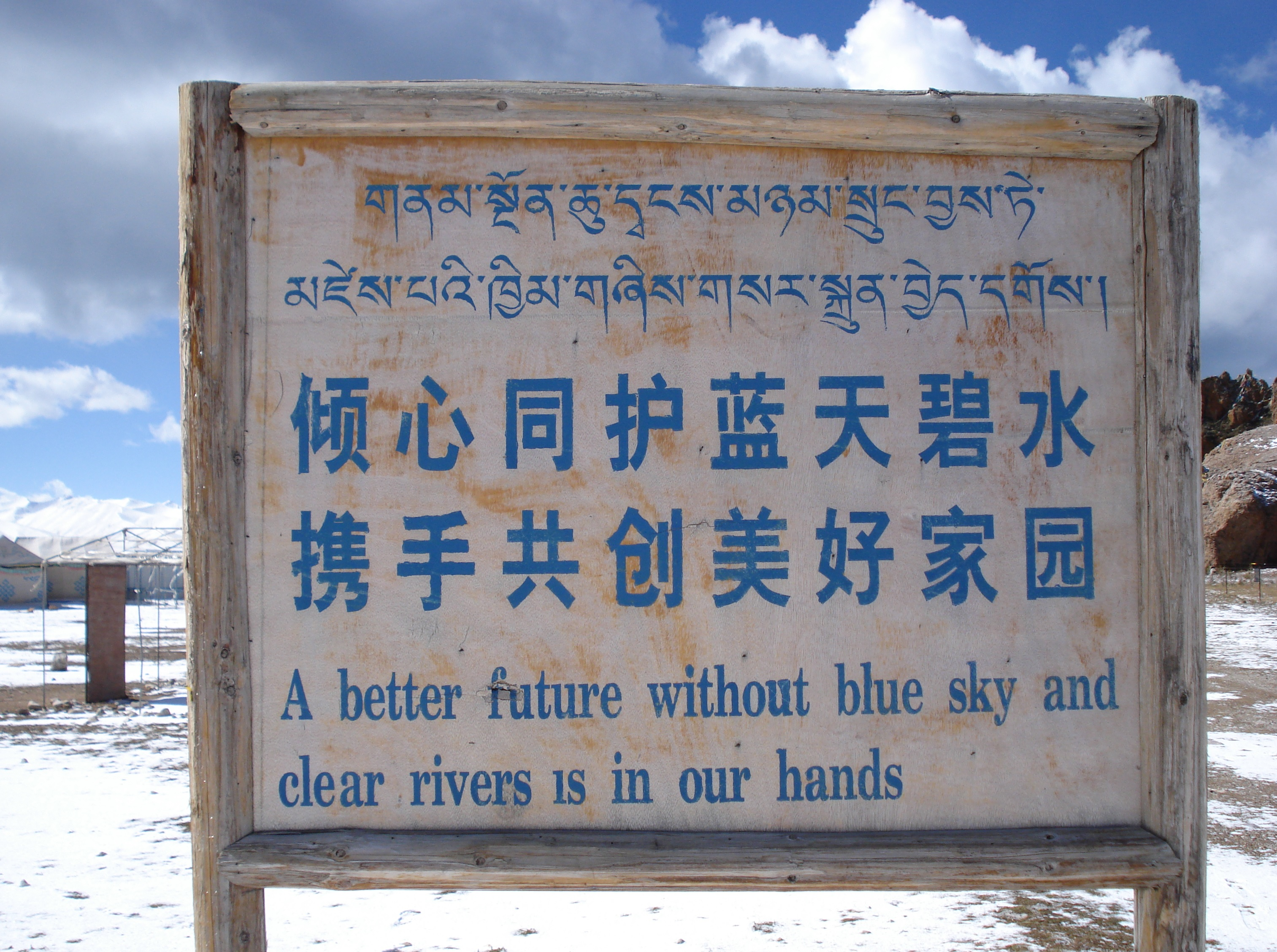
A 2015 sign in Namtso, Tibet promoting environmental awareness and conservation. lit. 'Together let's protect the blue sky and clear water wholeheartedly / Hand in hand we'll create a beautiful home.'

Some similar words are generally confused by most Chinglish speakers, for example "emergent" instead of "emergency" or "urgent", because of incorrect entries in dictionaries.

In Chinglish, "I know" 我知道 is generally used instead of the term "I see", when used to tell others that you understand what they said.

"See", "watch", "read", and "look" all refer to 看 (kàn) in Chinese. For example, 看電影 (看电影) means "to see a film" or "to watch a movie", 看書 (看书) means "to read a book", 看著我 (看着我) means "to look at me". Because of that, Chinglish speakers use "look" instead of "see", "watch", or "read". The same phenomena can be found in the use of "speak", "say", and "talk" 說 (说; shuō). The expression "Can you say Chinese?" (你会说中文吗？; 你會說中文嗎) would mean "Do you speak Chinese?"

Another misuse of vocabulary is "to turn on/off" and "open/close". Chinese speakers use 關 (关; guān) to refer to turning off things like electrical appliances or to close a door or window. Accordingly, a Chinglish speaker might say "close the light" rather than "turn off the light". In the same way, 開 (开; kāi) refers to turning those things on, or to open a door or window. As a result, they would say "open the TV" instead of "turn on the TV".

== Examples ==
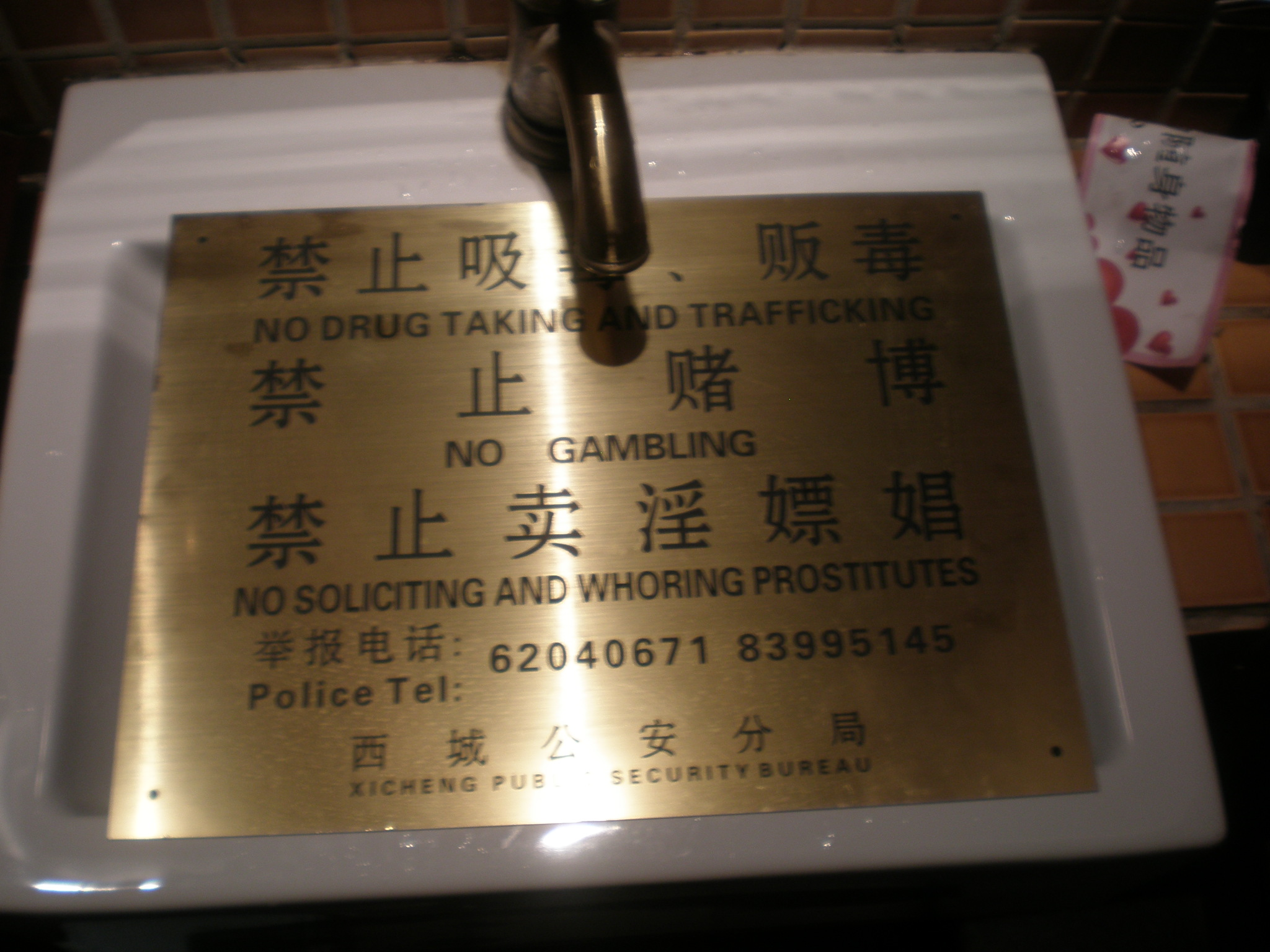
A 2008 sign over a sink in Xicheng advising "No soliciting and whoring prostitutes."

Collections of Chinglish are found on numerous websites (see below) and books. Owing to the ubiquity of Chinglish mistakes throughout the Sinophone world, the following examples will exclude common misspellings (e.g., "energetically Englsih-friendly environment") and typographical errors (a bilingual bus sign reading "往 不知道 To unknow"; wǎng 往 means "to; toward" and bùzhīdào 不知道 "don't know") that can occur anywhere in the English-speaking world.

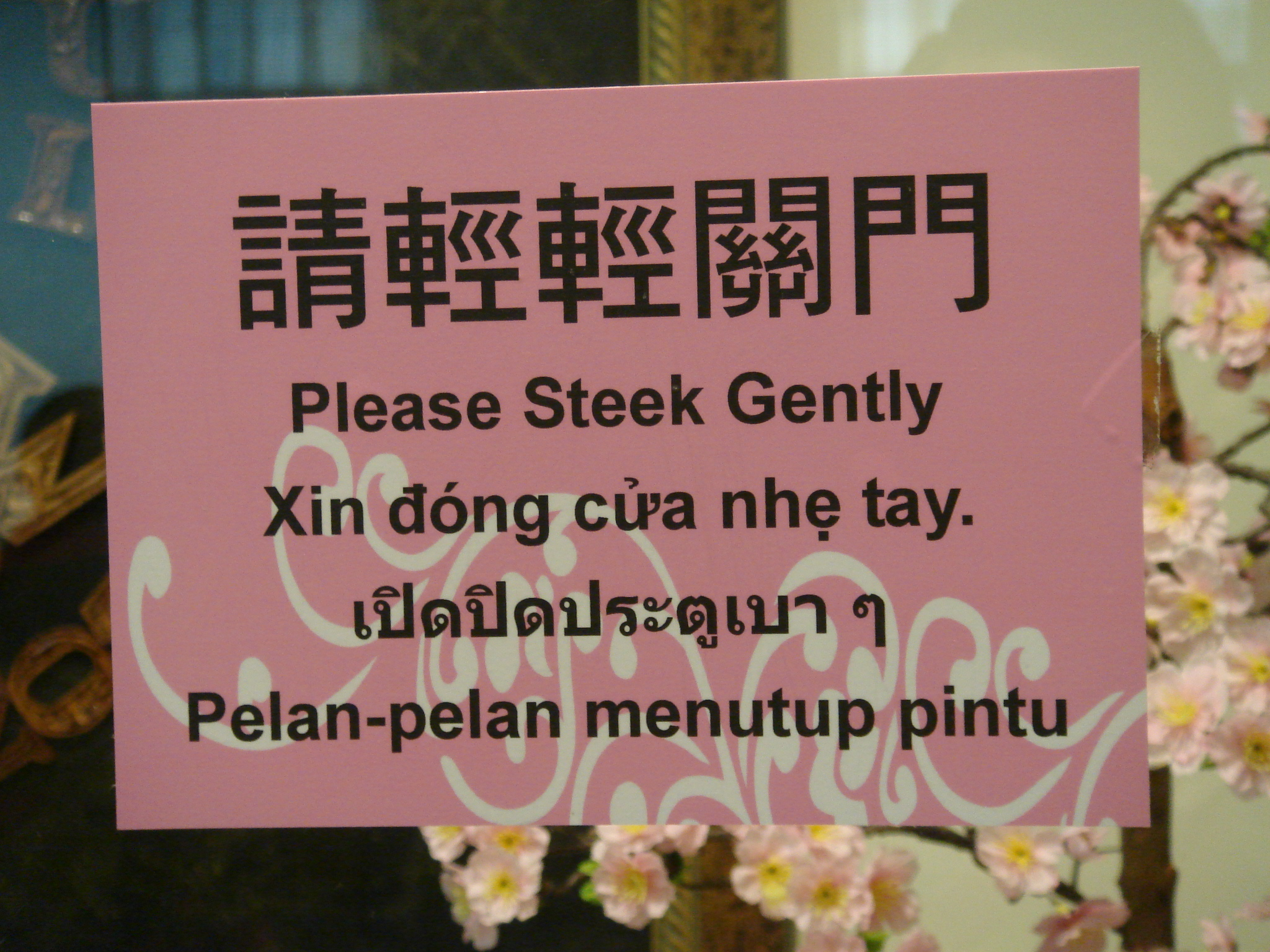
A 2006 multilingual sign on a door in Taipei uses the unusual Scottish English word steek ("shut") instead of close.

- Add oil. A commonly used Chinglish expression for 加油, an encouragement and supporting expression.
- Slip carefully (sometimes: Carefully slip and fall down). A common mistranslation of 小心地滑 "Caution. Wet floor." 地 means "floor" when pronounced as dì but is a suffix to an adverb when pronounced as de, respectively. The phrase 小心地滑 can be transliterated as "caution, the floor (is) wet" or "(to) carefully slip".
- To take notice of safe: The slippery are very crafty. A comparable sign in a Beijing garage reads zhùyì ānquán pōdào lù huá (注意安全 坡道路滑; 'Exercise caution. The slope is slippery').
- Workshop for concrete agitation appears on a sign in a Sichuan factory. jiǎobàn fáng (攪拌房), which combines jiǎobàn meaning "stir; mix; agitate" and fáng "house; room", translates as "mixing room".
- Spread to fuck the fruit is a Chinese supermarket sign mistranslation of sǎn gānguǒ (散干果; 散乾果; 'loose dried fruits'). Victor Mair noted the fuck translation of gān (干) was "fairly ubiquitous in China", and discovered this complicated Chinglish error resulted from machine translation software misinterpreting gānguǒ (干果; 乾果; 'dried fruits/nuts') as gàn guǒ (干果; 幹果; 'do/fuck fruits'). In written Chinese, sometimes a single simplified Chinese character is used for multiple traditional Chinese characters: gān (干; 'trunk', 'stem', 'intervene') is the simplified form of two words gān (乾; 'dry', 'dried up', 'in vain') and gàn (幹; 'trunk', 'main body', 'do', 'work', '(vulgar) fuck'). Mair's research revealed that the popular Chinese-English Jinshan Ciba dictionary (2002 edition) and Jinshan Kuaiyi translation software systematically rendered every occurrence of 干 as "fuck" (later editions corrected this error). Two comparable Chinglish mistranslations of gān "dry" as gàn "do; fuck" are: The shrimp fucks the cabbage for Xiāgān chǎo báicài (虾干炒白菜; 蝦乾炒白菜; 'stir-fried dried shrimp with Chinese cabbage'), and fuck the empress mistakes gàn hòu (干后; 幹后; 'do/fuck the empress') for gānhòu (干后; 乾後; 'after drying'), with hòu (后; 后; 'queen', 'empress') as the Simplified form of hòu (後; 'after').

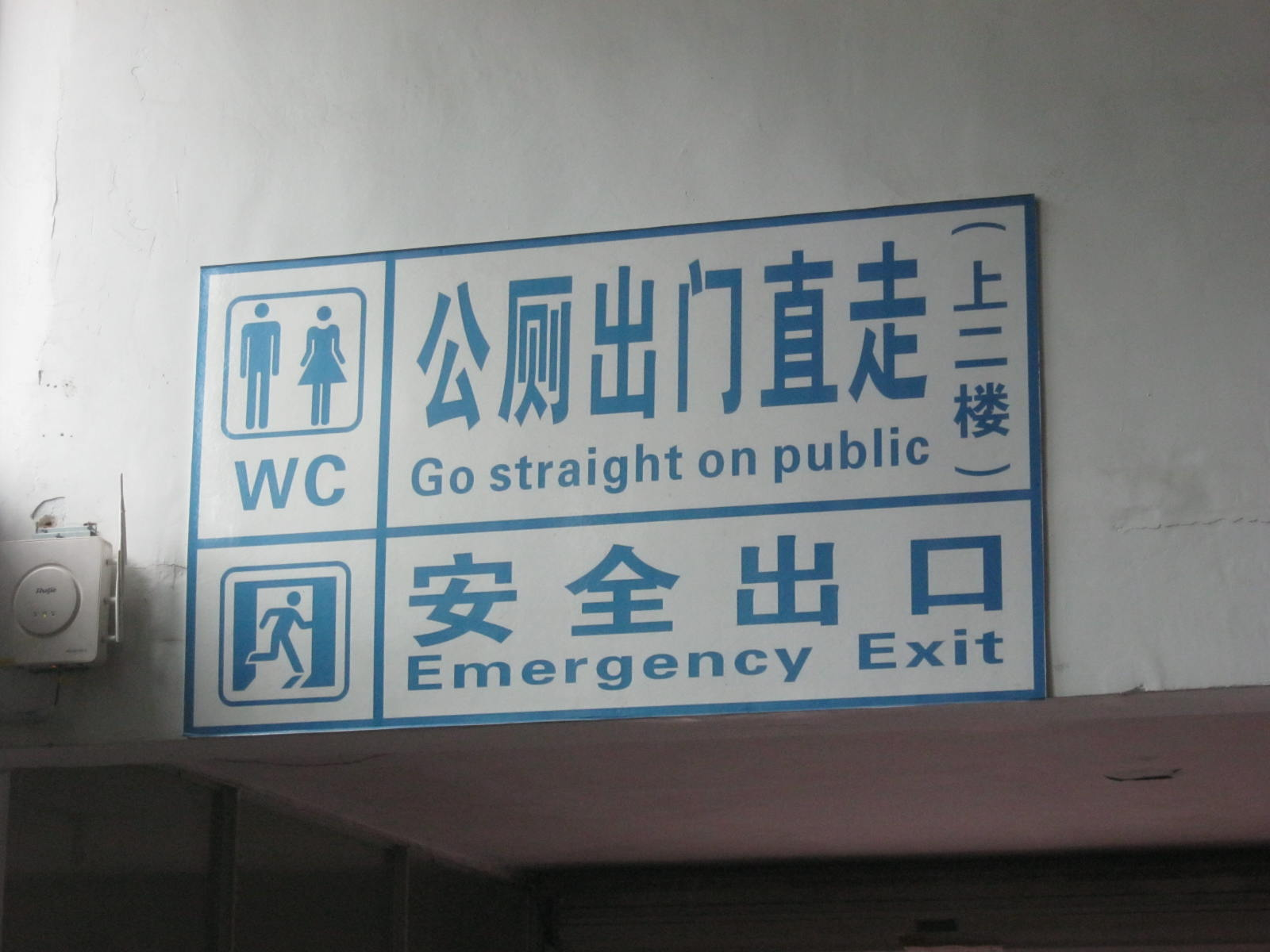
A sign at a bus station in Shaowu, Fujian, reading "Bathroom: exit through the door, and head straight (Up the stairs to the second floor)"

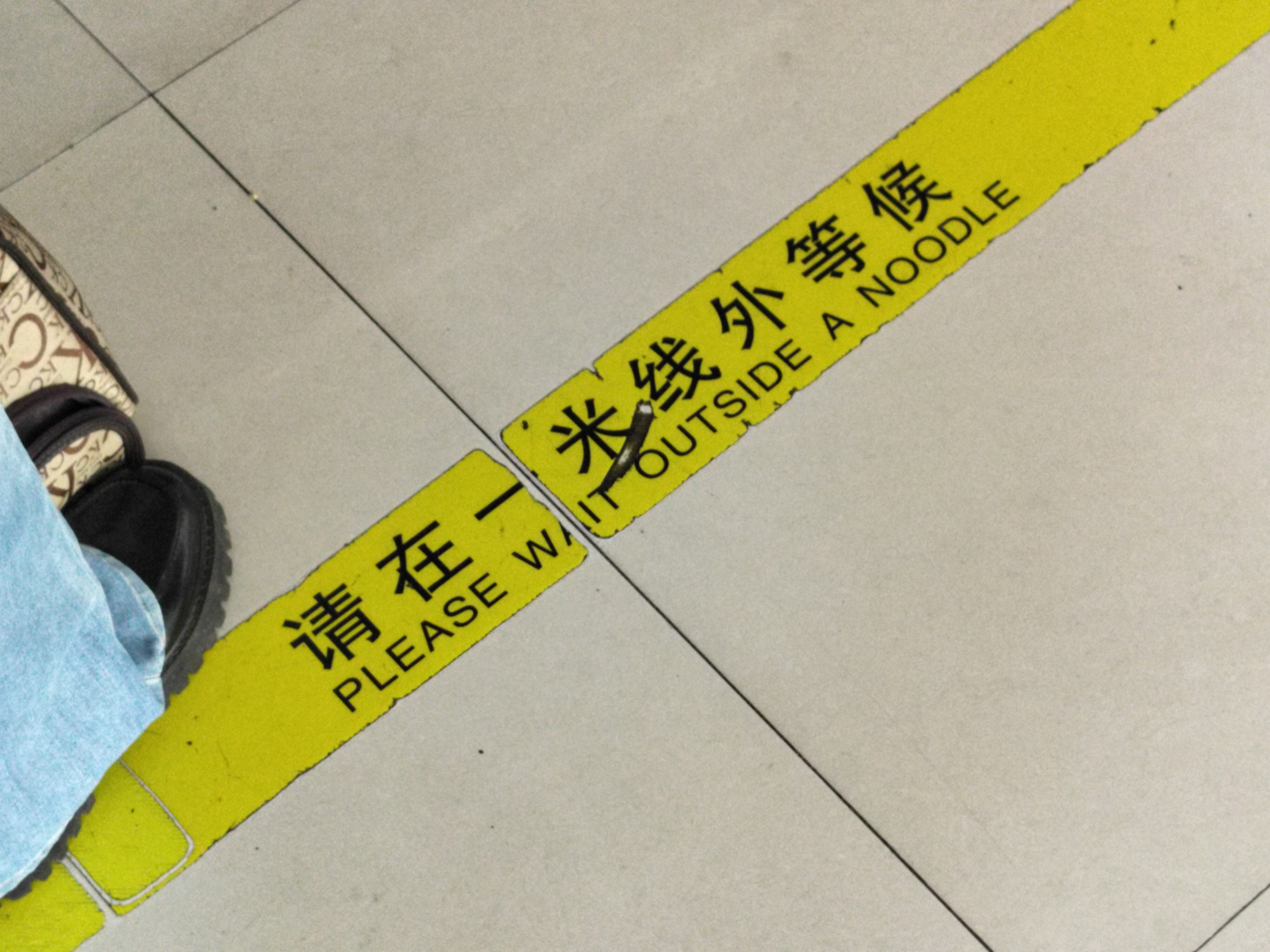
Chinglish sign at a coach station in Nanning, Guangxi reading "Please wait outside a noodle"

- Please steek gently appears on a Taipei government building door. This form of Chinglish uses obscure English terms, namely, Scottish English steek "enclose; close; shut" instead of the common word.
- Bumf Box for shǒuzhǐ xiāng (手紙箱; 'toilet paper box/case'), employs the British English word bumf, originally a shortened form of bumfodder meaning "toilet paper", now used to mean "useless documents".
- Braised enterovirus in Clay Pot appears on a Chinese menu for gānguō féicháng (干鍋肥腸; 'dry pot fatty intestine'), which is a stuffed sausage popular in Sichuanese-Hunanese cuisine. This example occurred following the Enterovirus 71 epidemic in China, and mistranslates féicháng (肥腸; 'pig's large intestines [used as food]') as cháng[dào] bìngdú (腸[道]病毒; 'intestinal virus').
- Fried enema on a menu mistranslates zhá guàn cháng (炸灌腸; 'fried sausage [with flour stuffed into hog casings]'). The Jinshan Ciba dictionary confused the cooking and medical meanings of guanchang "(make) a sausage; (give) an enema".
- A weak 'pyridaben carbazole' sound is found on translated instructions for a photographic light, "Install the battery into the battery jar, when heard a weak 'pyridaben carbazole' sound the installation is completed." The original Chinese has an onomatopoetic term dādā kǎzuò (噠噠咔唑; 'click or tick') rendered into dāmǎnlíng (噠蟎靈; 'pyridaben') and kǎzuò (咔唑; 'carbazole').
- 4 Uygur theater is printed on the bilingual instructions for a Chinese 4-D film about dinosaurs. The Chinese term sìwéi (四維; '4 dimensions') uses wéi "tie up; maintain, uphold; estimate" that commonly transcribes foreign names such as wéiwú'ěr (維吾爾; 'Uyghur').
- Exterminate Capitalism Lobster Package was the Chinglish rendering of tāotiè lóngxiā cān (饕餮龍蝦餐; 'gourmand lobster meal') on a menu mentioned by The New York Times. Victor Mair analyzed the linguistic impossibility of rendering Taotie (饕餮) "a mythical beast; glutton; greedy person" as "exterminate capitalism" and concluded somebody "mischievously provided an absurd translation, perhaps with the intention of poking fun at the Chinese Communist system which has given rise to such luxurious and fancy dining practices as reflected in pretentious menus of this sort."
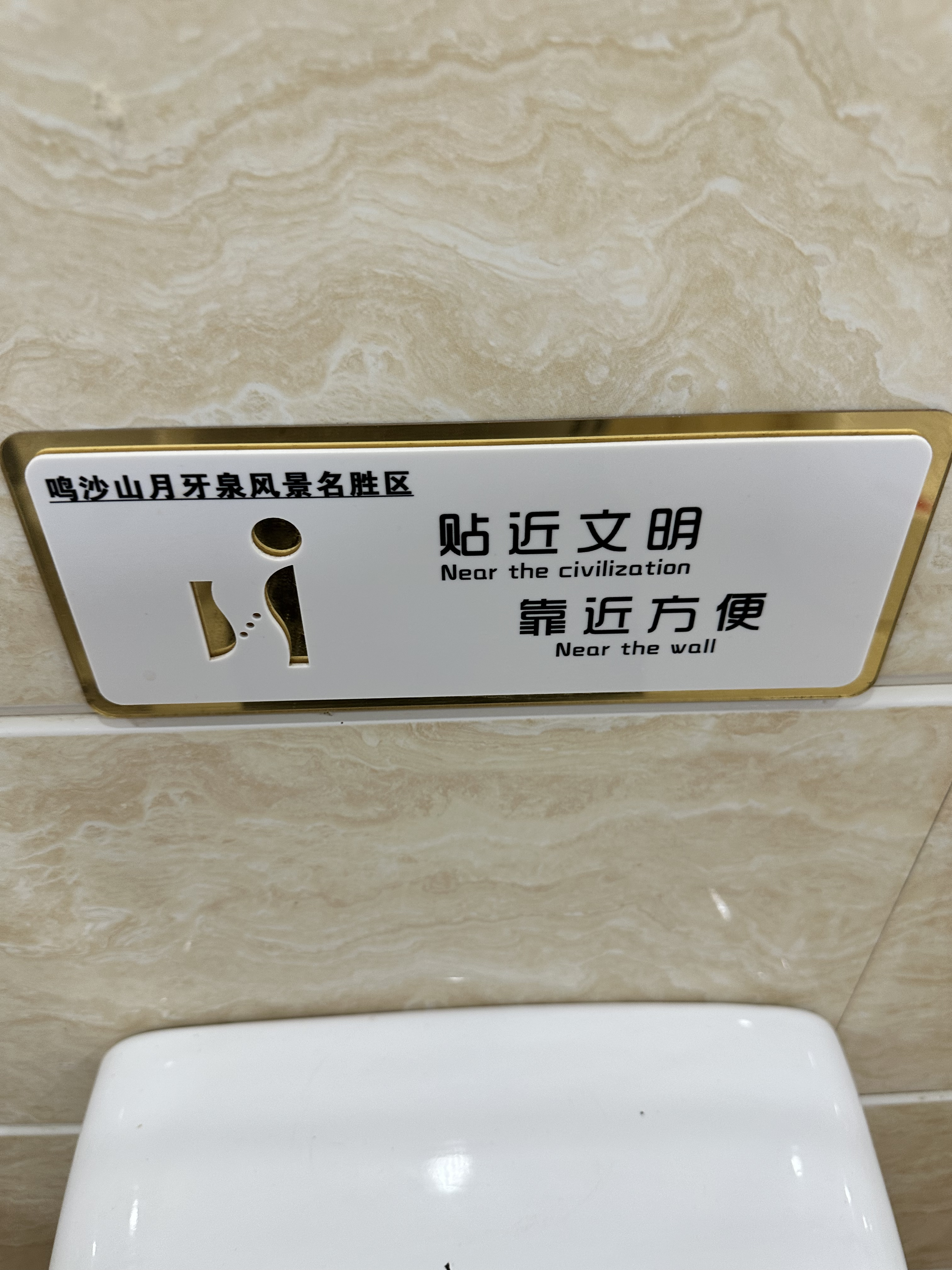
- A Chinglish public restroom sign in China using literal translations to encourage cleanliness
  Do not want is a mistranslation, albeit a substantially intelligible one (e.g., "[I] do not want [what is happening to happen]") of "Nooooo-!" exclaimed by Darth Vader in a bootleg version of Star Wars: Episode III – Revenge of the Sith, a phrase which has since become an internet meme. A bootleg copy of the film titled "Star War – The third gathers: Backstroke of the West" was bought in China, and featured erroneous English subtitles that were machine translated back from a Chinese translation of the original English, i.e. a re-translation, which was posted online due to its humorous use of poor English. Having gone viral, the phrase has spread as a meme used on messageboards online. The mistranslation is an example of translation decay following an English translation to Chinese, which is then re-translated back into English; the exclamation "no" would be correctly translated as 不要; bùyào in Chinese, however since 要; yào can also mean "want", and 不; bù is used as a negation particle, 不要 can also be translated as "do not want". As an example, the phrase 我不要去 correctly translates to "I (do not) want to go", however the discussion 「你要不要吃飯？」／「不要。」 translates to "Do you want to eat?"/"No." as well. Other humorous mistranslations from this movie include "They're all over me" as "He is in my behind", "The Jedi Council" as "The Presbyterian Church", and the notorious phrase "May the force be with you" as "The wish power are together with you".

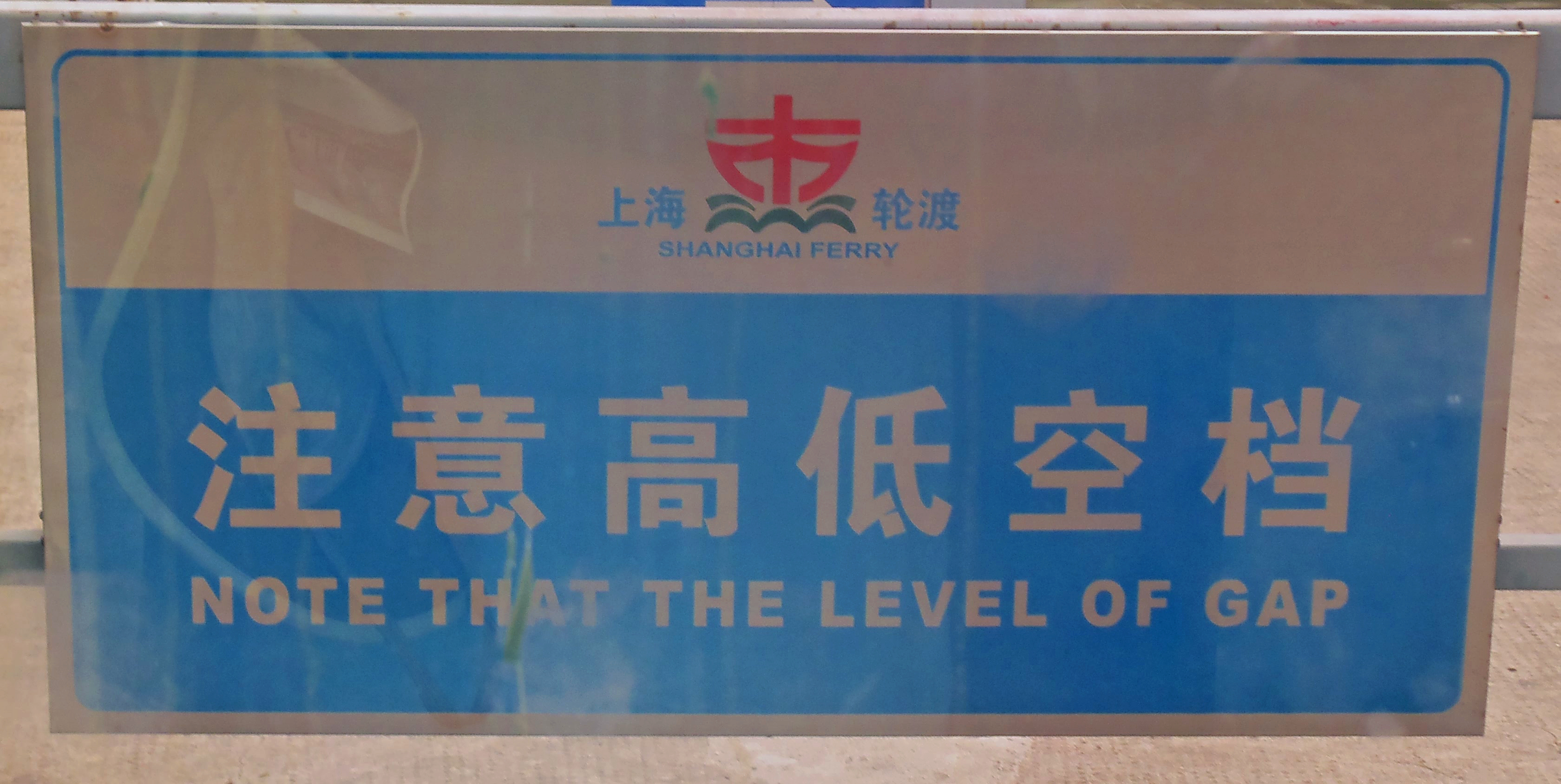
A 2013 sign of "Mind the gap" in Chinglish on a Shanghai Ferry dock.

- Go straight on public is a mistranslation of "Public washroom outside on the second floor."
- Note that the level of gap, which is a sentence fragment, is how signs on Shanghai's ferry docks render "Mind the gap", the phrase that spread from the London Underground to worldwide use.
- Don't stampede is featured on signs in lavatories to inform users that using a sitting toilet like a squatting toilet is prohibited.
- Mustard Silk is a mistranslation of "shredded pickled vegetables", (literally, "pickled mustard shred.") The product was employed by China Eastern Airlines.
- Civilization tour is found on signs on boats on the West Lake in Hangzhou, Zhejiang as a mistranslation for wénmíng lǚyóu ("tour civilizedly")
- Please stand behind a noodle is a mistranslation of "Please wait outside the one-meter line", due to the word 米线 (mixian) being able to be interpreted in two ways, one meaning "meter line" and one meaning "rice noodle"

== See also ==
- Hong Kong English
- Code-switching in Hong Kong
- Non-native pronunciations of English
- Mute English
- English as she is spoke
- Westernised Chinese language
- Hinglish
- Singlish
