= Broken English =

Intentional use of poorly formed English

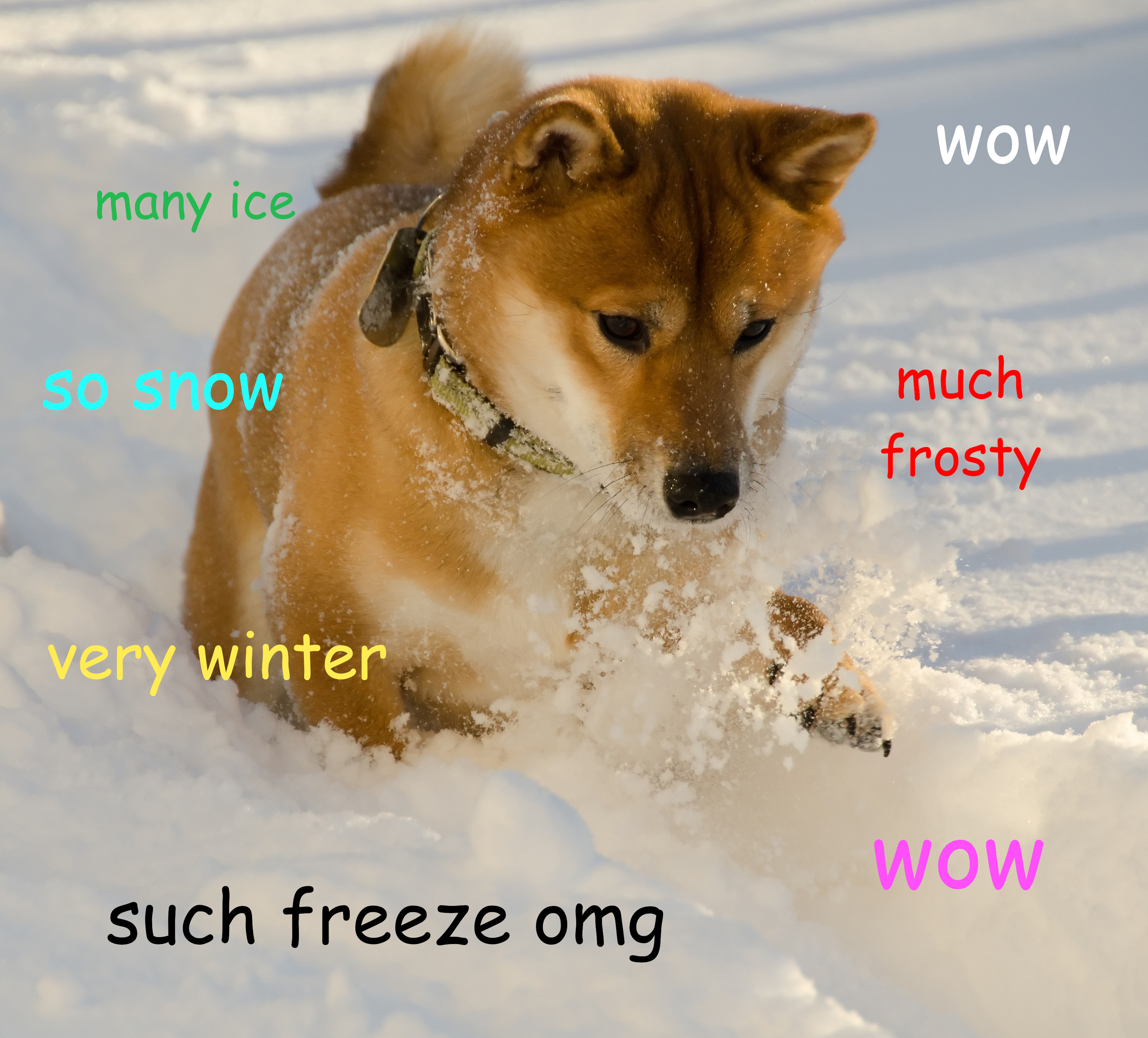
A Doge meme featuring intentionally broken English

Broken English encompasses non-standard, non-traditionally spoken and alternatively-written versions of the English language. This term is often considered derogatory and has been used to invalidate non-standard or "low prestige" varieties of English, particularly those that arose in the context of colonialism or language contact between multiple distinct cultures. While it sometimes refers to any non-standard form of English, it often carries a negative connotation, implying inferiority and incorrectness compared to "standard" English.

These forms of English are sometimes considered as a pidgin if they have derived in a context where more than one language is used. Under the most commonly accepted definition of the term, broken English consists of English vocabulary grafted onto the syntax of a non-English speaker's native language, including word order, other aspects of sentence structure, and the presence or absence of articles in the speaker's native language. Typically, the non-English speaker also strips English phrases of linguistic markings that are definite articles or certain verb tenses.

The use of non-standard forms of English can be a way for communities to assert their cultural identity and resist linguistic dominance. This has been documented, for example, among the Māori of New Zealand, where the younger generation was more proficient in English than the previous generation, but intentionally made modifications to the language to assert their own sense of cultural identity.

== Broken English in literature ==
The use of non-standard English in literature can be a complex and contested issue. In literature, broken English is often used to depict the foreignness of a character, or that character's lack of intelligence or education. However, poets have also intentionally used broken English to create a desired artistic impression, or as a creative experiment writing somewhere between standard English and a local language or dialect.

For example, in Henry V, William Shakespeare used broken English to convey the national pride of Scottish and Irish allies in the King's invasion of Normandy. When Henry himself last implores the French Princess Katherine to marry him, knowing that her command of the English language is limited, he says to her: "Come, your answer in broken music; for thy voice is music and thy English broken; therefore, queen of all, Katherine, break thy mind to me in broken English."

== See also ==
- All your base are belong to us
- Chinglish
- Creole language
- Doge
- Engrish
- Interlanguage
- List of English-based pidgins
- Machine translation#Issues
- Non-native pronunciations of English
- Polandball
- List of lishes
  - Singlish
