= Namlish =

Macaronic form of English spoken in Namibia

Namlish (a portmanteau of the words Namibian and English) is a form of English spoken in Namibia. The term was first recorded in 1991.

English is the country's official language since independence in 1990. Because it is the second or third language for the majority of the Namibians, local usage can vary significantly from usage elsewhere in the English-speaking world. Namibian English, or Namlish, shares many similarities with South African English, having been influenced both by Afrikaans and indigenous African languages.

== Examples of Namlish ==
=== Vocabulary ===
Namlish	English	Notes
Baas	Afrikaans: Boss	submissive appellation towards a male employer.
Babelas (verb and noun)	Afrikaans: (having a) hangover	
Bakkie	Pick-up truck	
Biltong	Dried meat; jerky	
Braai	Afrikaans: A barbecue or social grilling event	
Cucca Shop	A bar	The name was derived from a beer once sold in Angola
Eish	Oh my goodness	expression of surprise, shock, disdain, etc.
Mêmê	Mother	term of respect towards older women
Oom	Afrikaans: uncle	term of respect towards older men
Robot	Traffic lights	
Shebeen	Bar or club	
Tekkies	Sneakers	

=== Expressions ===
Namlish	English	Notes
hoezit?	What's up?	A common greeting.
Is it?	Really?	
Are we together?	Is it clear? Do you understand me?	This expression is used a lot in meetings and workshops. The first expression is also used in other varieties of English such as British English.
I will do that now now.	I will do it in a minute.	Doubling words emphasises their literal meaning.
... and what what.	... et cetera (probably from the idiom "... and whatnot")	Used a lot in meetings and workshops and what what.
It's !na.	It's ok!/It's great. It has a tongue-click sound common in native languages.	
How is the morning?	How are you?	Comes from Oshiwambo, Walalepo?
The time is going.	We're running out of time.	
So.. Otherwise?	Apart from the obvious, how are you?	Used as a greeting/to fill a gap in a conversation.
somehow (as an adjective)	so-so	

== Some observations ==
- Many Namibians repeat single-word responses twice, e.g. "Hi hi", "Fine fine" and "Sharp sharp" are all common responses in casual conversation.
- Upon asking How are you? Namlish speakers will greet you with Yes! or Yebo! Yebo comes from Zulu, which is an emphatic "yes" said throughout southern Africa.
- Directions can be very vague: That side is usually the answer.
- This one and that one are frequently used to talk about children and elderly people.
- 'I'm coming now now', 'I'm coming just now', 'I'm coming right now': All rather vague variations regarding time. Each repetition of the word "now" represents a closer approximation of the typical English "now". Three repetitions of the word is generally the most you will hear. It usually means a minute or less before the activity in question begins.
- "I'm coming" can mean numerous things. Usually, it means "I'm leaving and coming back within 5 minutes or not at all". Whereas "I'm coming now now" means "I'm coming right back now for sure".
- The word "somehow" is used to describe an event that was all-right, average, or unexceptional. When asked about a day, weekend, holiday, etc., Namibians often respond by saying it was "somehow". (Namibians frequently use, as in this instance, an adverb in place of an adjective. Another example of this is the use of the word "better". When asked about an exam, the response is often simply, "Better". What it is better than is never specified.)
- Whenever asking "How are you?", nearly always the answer is "fine".
- When talking about something small, Namibians use "ka..." (kaboy: small/little boy, kathing: something small in size).
- Words like "kutja" (pronounced as kusha) or Kama/kamastag are used instead of "apparently".
- First names and surnames become confused, e.g. Peter Griffin can be referred to as Mr. Peter, not Mr. Griffin.

== Pronunciation ==
As Namlish is its own dialect of English, it has its own pronunciation of English words. For instance, clothes is almost always pronounced with two syllables. Even Hifikepunye Pohamba (Namibia's former president) pronounces it this way.

== See also ==
- Commonwealth English
- German language in Namibia
- Chinglish
- Engrish
- Germish
- Spanglish
- Tinglish
