= Jewish English =

Jewish English may refer to:

- Jewish English varieties, varieties of the English language
- British Jews, the British people of Jewish descent
