= Equitisation =

Equitisation (Vietnamese: Cổ phần hóa) is a Vietnamese English term that denotes the conversion of a state-owned enterprise in Vietnam into a public (joint stock) company or a corporation by dividing ownership into shares. Equitisation is undertaken to further integrate the Vietnamese economy into the global market and gain access to foreign capital, and therefore often coincides with partial privatization, with the state retaining major or controlling stakes in the equitized firms.

== See also ==
- Corporatization
- Privatization
- Nationalization
- Socialist-oriented market economy
