= You swan, he frog =

Chinglish phrase

"You swan, he frog", abbreviated as "U swan, he frog", also "You pretty, he ugly, u swan, he frog", is a comforting Chinglish phrase popularized on social media. This phrase is a take on a Chinese allegory, “a toad wants to eat the meat of a swan” (simplified Chinese: 癞蛤蟆想吃天鹅肉; traditional Chinese: 癩蛤蟆想吃天鵝肉), which describes the pursuit of something that one is unworthy of. This phrase stems from a comment from a post on 7 August 2024 by a foreign blogger on Xiaohongshu that later spread to social media platform X. The metaphor of the swan and the frog has also gone viral, with a variety of memes juxtaposing celebrities or cartoon characters deemed unsuited for each other and designating them as either swans or frogs.
