= Westernised Chinese language =

Western-influenced variety of chinese language

Westernised Chinese (Chinese: 西式中文) encompasses common Chinese-language neologisms, spoken by foreign-influenced speakers or learners of Chinese, characterised by significant influence from Western languages, with particular regard to grammar, vocabulary, and syntax. Influences from English are particularly noticeable, especially in translations of literary works and documents.

Westernised Chinese varies from more traditional writing styles, and thus may at times pose comprehension issues for readers unfamiliar with this style. It is probable that most Westernised Chinese translations are direct glosses from English into Chinese by native Chinese speakers, given the absence of demand for native English speakers to perform written translation into Chinese. In the first half of the 20th century, Chinese novelist Lu Xun advocated that translations of Western works into Chinese should closely follow Westernised structures. Instead, many translators followed more natural translation styles from English to Chinese.

In Taiwan, Westernised Chinese includes many direct influences from the Japanese language, notably longer sentences. In Japanese and many other languages, longer sentences are associated with greater politeness. This had a direct effect on speech patterns in Taiwan, notably within the service industry. A more demanding 'service attitude' strengthened the public association between long sentences and politeness.

== Examples ==
- Abstract nouns as subjects, e.g.:
  - "The decline in his income has led to changes in his lifestyle."
  - "他的收入的减少改变了他的生活方式。" (他的收入的減少改變了他的生活方式。)
  - (he NOM income NOM decline change PERF he NOM life style.)
  - Better translation: "他因收入减少而改变生活方式。" (他因收入減少而改變生活方式。) (lit. he because [of] income declines, CONJ change life style.)
- Overuse of abstract verbs, e.g.:
  - "Audience responded very enthusiastically to the visiting professor."
  - "听众对访问教授作出了十分热烈的反应。" (聽眾對訪問教授做出了十分熱烈的反應)
  - (audience to visiting professor make PERF very enthusiastic response.)
  - Better translation: "听众对访问教授反应十分热烈。" (聽眾對訪問教授反應十分熱烈) (lit. audience to visiting professor respond very enthusiastically.)
- Overuse of "a/an" (一), e.g.:
  - "He is a good man."
  - "他是一个好人。" (他是一個好人)
  - (he is one-CL good person.)
  - Better translation: "他是好人。" (lit. he is good person.)
- Overuse of the subordinating particle "的" (NOM). In the Chinese language, adjectives placed immediately before nouns do not require '的', e.g.:
  - 'White duck', 'deep water'
  - '白色的鸭' (白色的鴨), '深深的水'
  - Better translation: "白鸭" (白鴨) ('白' is already used as a colour name, so '色' can be eliminated), '深水' (the second '深' is not necessary, unless it is used as emphasis, which would require '的' after the second '深')
- Overuse of nouns or gerunds when verb-based phrases are simpler, e.g.:
  - "做一个处理的动作" (做一個處理的動作) (performs a processing activity)
  - Better translation: "处理一下/一次" (處理一下/一次) (processes once) ('處理' is already a verb)
  - "He is reading."
  - "他进行阅读的动作。" (他進行閱讀的動作)
  - Better translation: "他正在閱讀。"
- Overuse of the passive voice (被动句/被動句).
  - In Chinese, it is also associated with negative connotations, e.g.:
    - "He is called ..."
    - "他被称为…" (他被稱為)
    - (he COVERB call (to-)be...)
    - Better translation: "他叫…" (lit. he calls)
  - In Chinese, active phrases are more commonly used, except in journals where objectivity is expected, e.g.:
    - "For the questionnaire portion, please help us to fill it."
    - "问卷的部份请帮我们做一个填写。" (問卷的部份請幫我們做一個填寫。)
    - Better translation: "请帮我们填写问卷的部份。" (請幫我們填寫問卷的部份)(Please help us fill in the questionnaire portion.)
- Overuse of adpositions such as '关于/關於' (about).
- Semantic overlap.
  - 'Male adult'
  - '雄性男人'
  - Better translation: '男人' ('男' already implies '雄性' (male))
- Overuse of "性" (-ity, lit. property).
- Overuse of the group suffix '们/們'.
  - In Chinese, the explicit group suffix is not used if the number of members in a group is stated, e.g.:
    - 'Three oranges'
    - '三个橙们' (三個橙們)
    - Better translation: '三个橙' (三個橙) (Three (units of)/individual oranges. The classifier '个/個' must be added between number and the base noun.)
  - If a number is not stated in second base noun, but is already applied to the first noun, and the first noun is used to describe the second noun, '们/們' is not used, e.g.:
    - 'Two boxes of oranges'
    - '二盒橙们' (二盒橙們)
    - Better translation: '兩盒橙'
  - Certain alternate group words can be used without altering meaning, depending on context, e.g.:
    - 'Everyone'
    - Proper translation: '各位', '诸位/諸位' (In both English and Chinese, the words apply to singular and plural audiences.)
    - '诸/諸', '等', '众/眾', '群' are also applicable to groups.

== See also ==
- Chinglish
