= PowerWord =

- Developer: Kingsoft
- Stable release: PowerWord 2011 / January 13, 2012
- Operating system: Microsoft Windows; Mac OS X iPhone; Java (for S60 and S40)
- Available in: Chinese
- Type: Dictionary software
- License: Various
- Website: Product page

PowerWord (simplified Chinese: 金山词霸; traditional Chinese: 金山詞霸; pinyin: jīnshān cíbà; lit. 'Kingsoft Word Master') is a collection of Chinese, English and bilingual dictionaries and supporting proprietary software, published on CD-ROM in China by Kingsoft. Originally produced for the Microsoft Windows platform, it is now available for Mac OS X, iPhone, Java for Nokia smartphones, and is available online. The CD-ROM often prominently carries the label "CIBA", as well as Chinese characters.

== Basic usage ==
The user interface can be set to be either Chinese or English. The installer seems to use the system default location.

Pointing the mouse at any word on the screen cause a small box to pop up with a brief definition and links to access a more expanded definition in the main program, to search the Web for that word using the company's search engine, or to hear the word spoken. The main program contains a text box at the top, into which may be typed (or pasted) an English or Chinese-character word or phrase to access the dictionary entries. If an exact match is not found, then the nearest entry is shown.

A speech synthesizer is available to read many of the English entries (in an American accent) by clicking on the small loudspeaker. There are natural recordings of some words, while others are synthesized. The Chinese words can also be spoken by using recordings of single syllables (which means there is a problem with fluency when reading words of more than one syllable).

== Problems and criticism ==
The 2002 version of PowerWord contained some obscene English words as default translations of common Chinese terms. PowerWord corrected this in later versions, but many users failed to upgrade, so the obscene English words were commonly seen in Chinese shop signage as late as 2007.

Translations in the PowerWord dictionaries are in general very brief, and a word's full connotations are not always explained. In some newer versions of PowerWord this situation can be improved by selecting better dictionaries from the main program window.

Text can be copied from a dictionary and pasted elsewhere. However, when running the 2002 edition on non-Chinese versions of Windows (even ones that are Unicode-aware), the characters become mojibaked when pasted, and the resulting text must be explicitly re-interpreted as GB 2312 using a character set translation utility. This problem does not exist when pasting text into the application.

The font size of the program cannot be changed, which is an accessibility problem.

== Coverage ==
Because the translations in PowerWord's dictionaries are brief, the application works best when dealing with well-defined, unambiguous technical words rather than normal words. It is supplied with several additional dictionaries of technical words in specific fields.

The choice of fields is biased toward areas of high commercial profit, as can be seen from the list of dictionaries below.

=== List of dictionaries ===
The 2002 edition of the CD-ROM contains a total of 83 dictionaries, as follows:

- The basic dictionary, which is always installed with the program (the others can be selected or de-selected in the advanced installation options).
- Eight additional general-purpose dictionaries: "Kingsoft Detailed English–Chinese Dictionary", "A Modern English–Chinese Comprehensive Dictionary", "American Heritage Dictionary" (English–English), "An English–Chinese Graphic Dictionary", "A Senior Chinese Dictionary", "A Great International Standard Dictionary of Chinese Characters", and "American Heritage Dictionary (two-direction)"
- Eight "computer and communication" dictionaries (including the "Longman English–Chinese Computer Dictionary" and the "Longman Chinese–English Computer Dictionary")
- 11 dictionaries dealing with specialist vocabulary in various fields of industry and manufacturing
- 14 dictionaries dealing with specialist vocabulary in various fields of science and technology
- 10 dictionaries dealing with the specialist vocabularies of various aspects of business
- 9 dictionaries dealing with the specialist vocabularies of various aspects of transportation
- 5 dictionaries dealing with the specialist vocabularies of medicine (including Traditional Chinese medicine and psychology)
- 11 dictionaries dealing with the specialist vocabularies of various aspects of energy production and similar resources (mining, water)
- 6 other specialist dictionaries on architecture, agriculture/husbandry/forestry and firefighting

== Controversy ==
In 2007, PowerWord was blamed by a furniture company for a racial slur printed on the label of a couch. When the Chinese characters for "dark brown" (simplified: 黑褐, pinyin: hei1 he4) are typed into a version of Kingsoft's Chinese-English translation software, it produces, among other translations, the words "nigger brown". The company has corrected this in the 2007 release of PowerWord.

== See also ==
- Wenlin Software for Learning Chinese
