= Senkyoshigo =

Mormon missionary non-secret cant

Senkyoshigo (Japanese: 宣教師語, lit. 'missionary language') is a non-secret cant developed and spoken by Mormon missionaries serving at missions in Japan which synthesizes the native English of missionaries with aspects of Japanese. Although the grammatical framework of the cant is primarily rooted in English, it synthesizes English function words with a primarily Japanese lexicon with English pronunciations of words.

== Characteristics ==
Senkyoshigo maintains the pronunciation, morphology, and syntax of English but utilizes lexical items from Japanese as well as slang terms formed from Japanese words, ultimately comprising a cant that is unintelligible to non-members. However, senkyoshigo is not intended to be a secret language, as it is taught to new missionaries openly and is often used in a recreational sense as a form of group bonding. Situation also plays an important role in whether or not missionaries speak senkyoshigo as opposed to English or Japanese. Since senkyoshigo is often considered frivolous by mission leaders, its use in religious meetings is often admonished compared to its frequent usage in more casual settings. However, subdued senkyoshigo is still commonly heard in interviews with mission leaders and church meetings with other missionaries. There has been some disagreement in academia regarding the status of senkyoshigo, but general consensus considers it to not be a proper example of a mixed language due to the conscious effort on the part of missionaries to develop new vocabulary and the limited usage to in-group communication rather than to communicate between English and Japanese speakers. This is further supported by the fact that all speakers of senkyoshigo can speak both English and Japanese and are expected to do so in formal settings, therefore not requiring a proper mixed language in the first place.

An example of a sentence in senkyoshigo would be "Hey dode, have you benkyo-ed your seiten-s for our shukai today yet?" which would translate into English as, "Hey companion, have you studied your scriptures for our meeting today yet?"

Although there is a degree of consistency in regards to vocabulary and syntax between missions, some variance in vocabulary exists and senkyoshigo can take different forms between different missions. Senkyoshigo slang has also varied over time, which can be seen in the altering of the term to describe mailmen changing from "bigot" to "steve" over the decades.
