= Språkförsvaret =

Swedish language advocacy group

Språkförsvaret (Swedish: [ˌsprôːkfœˈʂvɑːrɛt], "The Language Defence") is a politically independent network working to strengthen the Swedish language in Sweden and Finland. It is particularly concerned with defending the Swedish language from the global influence of English. The association was established in 2005.
