= Translation of neologisms into Chinese =

Translating new terms into Chinese

Translation of neologisms into Chinese generally follows three principles: free translation (意译 yìyì, literally "translation according to meaning") and transcription (音译 yīnyì, literally "translation according to sound"), or a combination of the two.

Chinese translations can be roughly divided into two categories: official translation names and folk (or non-governmental; popular) translation names. Since the Chinese language is spoken in several countries and territories around the world, most importantly the People's Republic of China (mainland China), Hong Kong, Macau and the Republic of China (more commonly referred to as Taiwan), and standardisations of Chinese translation names in these countries are regulated by different institutions, it is common for one to encounter different Chinese names for the same subject. More specifically, mainland China, Taiwan, Singapore and Malaysia have official institutions and standards to regulate translations into Chinese, whereas in Hong Kong, translation names from media (including television, radio stations and newspapers) and established popular translation names predominate, which usually go on to further influence Macau and overseas Chinese communities.

- Official translation names (官方译名 guānfāng yìmíng) refer to standard translation names of a specific region, which are normally established by relevant governmental nomenclature departments, with the purpose of standardising Chinese names for terms (including names of people, places and objects) in non-official languages. Such translation names only appear in regions administered by that government, and are often not applicable to regions beyond administration.
- Official names (官方名称 guānfāng míngchēng) are translation names developed by copyright-holding companies and are usually applicable to any Chinese-speaking region. However instances of companies which establish region-wise translation names also exist.
- Folk translation names (or popular translation names, 民间译名 mínjiān yìmíng) are translation names for things that do not have official Chinese names or official translation names, and are established and popularised by ordinary people. Names as such are most often are not differentiated by region, but are instead divided in terms of the Chinese dialect used, such as Mandarin Chinese used in mainland China, and Cantonese used in Hong Kong.
- Special names (特殊名称 tèshū míngchēng) are names for special disciplines, such as Catholicism and Buddhism, and usually follow special standards or rules. Besides, this category may also apply to foreign officials whose translation names are specially established by foreign official institutions, for convenience of reporting from worldwide Chinese-language media, as well as famous people of Chinese descent from overseas, who make announcements of their true Chinese names to avoid mis-translation by media, for example Hun Sen, the Cambodian prime minister, who announced in 2003 that his Chinese name should be written as "云升 Yún Shēng".

== Types ==
=== Meaningful ===
In modern Chinese, traditionally, free translations or semantic translations (意译／意譯; yìyì, literally "meaningful translation") are used for translating of non-proper nouns (proper nouns include names of people, places, countries, etc.). Most non-proper noun terms are introduced into modern Chinese using this method, including many names re-integrated into Chinese from Japanese terms, which were originally translated from Chinese kanji, during the 19th and 20th century. This is opposed to transcription (see below).

Examples:

- Basketball — 篮球 lánqiú, "basket ball"
- Physics — 物理 wùlǐ, "logics [of]/reasons [behind] matter/things", first introduced by Fang Yizhi (方以智)
- Chemistry — 化学 huàxué, "subject [of] transformations", first introduced by Xu Shou (徐寿, generally regarded)
- Mobile phone — 手机 shǒujī, "hand device/machine"
- Laser — 激光 jīguāng, "stimulated light" (abbreviated from "light amplification by stimulated emission of radiation"), the official translation used in Mainland China coined by Qian Xuesen in 1964

=== Transcription ===
Transcriptions into Chinese (音译; yīnyì, literally "phonetic translation") are used to translate proper nouns that previously have no equivalent counterparts in the Chinese lexicon.

Examples:

- Guitar — 吉他, jítā (sometimes referred to as "吉它", jítā)
- Coffee — 咖啡, kāfēi
- Pizza — 比萨, bǐsà (sometimes referred to as "披萨", pīsà)
- Laser — 鐳射, léishè (sometimes referred to as "雷射", léishè), the phonetic translation commonly used in Hong Kong, Taiwan, Malaysia and Singapore

=== Combination ===
Phonosemantic matching, finding phrases which combine both the meaning and sound of the neologism. Examples:

- Hamburger — 汉堡包, hànbǎobāo (sometimes abbreviated as "汉堡", hànbǎo), "Hamburg meat bun"
- Gene — 基因 jīyīn, "fundamental factor"
- Hacker — 黑客 hēikè, "wicked visitor", (or "black/dark visitor", literally)
