= Vietglish =

Mixture of Vietnamese and English

Vietglish, Vinglish or Vietlish, is an informal term for a mixture of elements from Vietnamese and English.

The term Vietglish is first recorded in 1969. Other colloquial portmanteau words for Vietlish include (chronologically): Vietglish (1992), Vinish (2003), Vinglish (2010) and Vietnamiglish (2016).

This usage is said to be found in Vietnamese immigrant communities in majority-English-speaking countries. Borrowed English words are also commonly used in everyday Vietnamese both inside and outside Vietnam in informal contexts.

Sample phrases
Vietglish	Vietnamese	English
You're Xinh Quá/ You're Xinh	Bạn thật dễ thương	You're Cute (Xinh Quá means "so pretty" in normal Vietnamese)
You're Xạo Quá	Bạn nói dối / Bạn nói xạo	You're lying
