= Greeklish =

Greek language written using the Latin alphabet

Greeklish, a portmanteau of the words Greek and English, also known as Grenglish, Latinoellinika/Λατινοελληνικά or ASCII Greek, is the Greek language written using the Latin script. It's also refer to code-mixing or code-switching of Greek and English. Unlike standardized systems of Romanization of Greek, as used internationally for purposes such as rendering Greek proper names or place names, or for bibliographic purposes, the term Greeklish mainly refers to informal, ad-hoc practices of writing Greek text in environments where the use of the Greek alphabet is technically impossible or cumbersome, especially in electronic media. Greeklish was commonly used on the Internet when Greek people communicated by forum, e-mail, IRC, instant messaging and occasionally on SMS, mainly because older operating systems did not support non-Latin writing systems, or in a unicode form like UTF-8. Nowadays most Greek language content appears in the Greek alphabet.

== History ==
Some older traditions of using the Latin alphabet for Greek existed in earlier centuries. The term frankolevantinika properly refers to the use of the Latin script to write Greek in the cultural ambit of Catholicism. ("Frankos" is an older Greek term for Roman Catholic.) This usage was routine in the Venetian-ruled Greece and in Venetian Crete in the early modern era. Indeed, the autograph manuscripts of several Greek literary works of the Renaissance are in Latin script (e.g. the comedy Fortounatos by Markos Antonios Foskolos, 1655). This convention was also known as frankochiotika/φραγκοχιώτικα, "Frankish/Catholic Chiot", alluding to the significant presence of Catholic missionaries based on the island of Chios.

== Orthographic and phonetic Greeklish ==
Greeklish may be orthographic or phonetic. In orthographic use, the intent is to reproduce Greek orthography closely: there is a one-to-one mapping between Greek and Latin letters, and digraphs are avoided, with occasional use of punctuation or numerals resembling Greek letters rather than Latin digraphs. While letters are in the first instance chosen for phonetic similarity, visual equivalence, and corresponding keyboard keys, are used when phonetically similar letters are exhausted. Thus, psi (ψ) may be written as ps, 4 or y; xi (ξ) as ks, x or 3; and theta (θ) as th or 8.

In phonetic use, there is no concern to reproduce Greek orthography, and the Greeklish is a phonetic transcription (usually with English phonetic norms, sometimes with other languages' like German) of Greek words — although often there is a mixture of the two. In particular, iotacism is preserved: the various letters and digraphs now pronounced as /i/ are transcribed as i, and not differentiated as they are in an orthographic scheme (e.g. h, i, u, ei, oi for η ι υ ει οι). In a phonetic scheme, xi is usually j x or ks or 3; ks or 3 is used if x has been chosen, following orthographic norms, for chi (χ). Psi and theta will usually be the digraphs ps and th. 3 is often used to represent xi (ξ) because of the similar shape of the number 3 to the original letter albeit mirrored.

An example of orthographic Greeklish could be the word "plateia", which in Greek means "square" and using the Greek alphabet is spelled "πλατεία". The word "plateia" derives from the exact replacement of each Greek letter with its Latin respective: π=p, λ=l, α=a, τ=t, ε=e, ι=i, α=a.

An example of phonetic Greeklish could be the same word, "square", written like this: "platia". The reason the same word is, in this occasion, written without the letter "e", is the fact that, phonetically, the word "square" in Greek sounds exactly like this: "platia" (since -"εί"- is now pronounced /i/, as an instance of iotacism), but not for the phonology and the historical or learned pronunciation of the Ancient Greek language (where it was "plateia").

The most extreme case of orthographic Greeklish, which achieves the greater optical resemblance to the Greek prototypes, is perhaps the so-called "byzantine" or "arabesque" or "calligraphic/artistic" Greeklish introduced in the Hellas mailing list by the mathematician George Baloglou. Main characteristics of Baloglou's "byzantine" is the distinction of σ and ς (σ=c ς=s), the distinction of lower and upper letters, such as π=n, Π=TT or 5, θ=8, Θ=0 or Q, ψ=y, Ψ=4, and the unusual, but with great resemblance with the Greek prototype, transliterations σ=c, π=n ρ=p Ρ=P.

Since there were many relevant differences both in the written and in the spoken language—such as in the grammar, orthography and phonology of Greek- at the time of the Ancient Greek, the Koine, Jewish Koine, Medieval and Modern, thus the same word across the history may change outstandingly and therefore have multiple choices of "rendering" (transliteration or transcription) depending on the time on which the referring text was written or translated.

== Books written in Greeklish ==
Giannis Androutsopoulos (see references) talks about Exegesis, a book in Greeklish that was published by Oxy Publications in 2000. The Greeklish transliteration was based on the Greek translation of the original book written by Astro Teller. A novel about artificial intelligence, it describes a computer program that has acquired a "mind" of its own. The original book was written entirely in the form of e-mail messages, something that prompted Androutsopoulos and his collaborators to publish a version of it in Greeklish.

== Computer usage ==
In the past there was a variety of mutually incompatible systems for displaying non-ASCII characters (IBM 437, ELOT 928, ISO 8859-7 plus a few company-specific encodings) and no standard method for typing them on a computer keyboard. This situation was resolved with the introduction of Unicode. Before the introduction of Unicode-compatible software (web servers and clients) many Greek personal or informal web sites were written in Greeklish. This is no longer the case and most (if not all) of the sites with Greek content are written in native Greek.

Almost all electronic mail messaging was also using Greeklish, and only recently, with the introduction of full Unicode compatibility in modern e-mail client software and gradual replacement of older programs, that usage of Greek characters became widespread.

Some Internet service providers in Greece use both Greek and Greeklish in their emails. For example, the corporate announcements sent to users via email are usually written in English, Greek, and Greeklish. This is done to ensure that the recipient can understand an important service message even if the settings of their computer for non-ASCII characters don't match those of the sender.

== Commercial use ==
=== Use in advertisements ===
As of 2008, business advertisements using Greeklish have appeared in Athens Metro and other areas. Companies that have used Greeklish in some of their advertisements include Pizza Hut, Forthnet and Vodafone.

=== Use in business communication ===
Use of Greeklish for business purposes or business communication is considered as a lack of business ability or respect.

== Current trends ==
Around 2004, after most computer software became compatible with Unicode UTF-8 or UTF-16 systems, use of Greeklish was strongly discouraged in many Greek online Web discussion boards (forums) where Greeklish was in use before. Administrators threatened to ban users who continued to use Greeklish, thus making the use of Greek mandatory; but using Greeklish failed to become a serious reason to get banned. Examples include the Translatum Greek Translation Forum, the Athens Wireless Metropolitan Network Forum, the Venus Project Forum, the adslgr.com Forum, the e-steki.gr forum, the Greek Technological Forum, and the Greek student forum. The reason for this is the fact that text written in Greeklish is considerably less aesthetically pleasing, and also much harder to read, compared to text written in the Greek alphabet. A non-Greek speaker/reader can guess this by this example: "δις ιζ χαρντ του ριντ" would be the way to write "this is hard to read" in English but utilizing the Greek alphabet.

A counterargument used by forum users is that a fair number of users live abroad and access the Internet from computers they don't own (university, internet cafes, etc.). There, they are not able to install additional keyboard layouts so they don't have the ability to type in Greek, therefore Greeklish is the only option available to them.

On Greek IRC channels and IM applications, most of the time only Greeklish is used because it is simpler to type and typing errors are more easily excused. However, Greeklish has been criticised because the user's text bypasses spellcheck, resulting in lowering their ability to write native Greek correctly.

On the Facebook social networking web site there are various groups against the use of "Greeklish".

Wide use for Greeklish in long texts as of 2010, is unusual.

Another current trend in Greeklish is the introduction of Leet phrasing and vocabulary. Many Leet words or slang have been internalized within the Greek spoken language through Greek gamers online in games such as World of Warcraft.

Examples:

Greeklish	Explanation
Tsagia	"Goodbye" - back-formed Greek plural of Italian word ciao (hello/goodbye) - pun on the word τσάγια (tsagia) meaning teas
Re c	Re sy (ρέ συ), meaning "mate" or "dude" - pun on English pronunciation of letter 'c' - phrase is itself an abbreviation of "μωρέ εσύ" lit. moron you
Kalimerez, Merez	Kalimeres (καλημέρες) lit. Good Mornings; similar to English byez
Tpt	Tipota (τίποτα), meaning "nothing"
Dn	Den (δεν), meaning "not"
T	Ti (τι), meaning "what"
M	Mou (μου), meaning "my" or "mine"
S	Sou (σου), meaning "your" or "yours"
N	Na (να), meaning "to", or En (Εν), meaning "not" in Cypriot dialect
tr	tora (τώρα), meaning "now"
smr	simera (σήμερα), meaning "today"
klnxt	kalinixta (καληνύχτα), meaning "goodnight"
tlm	ta leme (τα λέμε), meaning "we will talk again"
sks	skase (σκάσε), meaning "shut up"
kn1	kanena (κανένα), meaning "none"
dld	diladi (δηλαδή), meaning "so, therefore"
vrm	variemai (βαριέμαι), meaning "I am bored"
mlk	malaka (μαλάκα), meaning "wanker" or "asshole" or, informally among male friends, 'mate' or 'buddy', usually as re mlk (ρε μαλάκα)
mnm	minuma (μήνυμα), meaning "message"
gmt	gamoto (γαμώ το), "fuck it" lit. "I fuck it"
emp1	empaina (έμπαινα) meaning "hot enough" (of a person, usually a woman)/"I'd hit that" lit. "I would go in"
t kns	ti kaneis (τι κάνεις), meaning "How are you" lit. what are you doing?
thktvsf	ti tha kanoume to vrady shmera file (τι θα κάνουμε το βράδυ σήμερα φίλε), meaning "What are we doing tonight" lit. what will we do tonight friend

== Examples ==
=== "Καλημέρα, πώς είστε;" ===
- Greeklish 1: kalimera, pos iste? (phonetic)
- Greeklish 2: kalhmera, pws eiste; (reconciling with spelling rules)
- Baloglou's "byzantine" variant: kalhmepa, nws eicte;
- Typing as if the keyboard layout were set to Greek, when it is actually set to US English: Kalhm;era, p;vw e;isteq
- Omitting some vowels, as a form of abbreviation: Klmr ps iste?

== Greeklish-to-Greek conversion ==
Since the appearance of Greeklish there have been numerous attempts to develop applications for automatic conversion from Greeklish to Greek. Most of them can cope with only some of Greeklish transliteration patterns and can be found and downloaded from the Internet. The first complete system for automatic transcription of Greeklish into Greek, obtaining correct spelling is All Greek to Me!, developed and provided by the Institute for Language and Speech Processing.

The first open online application for the transcription of Greeklish to Greek, was developed by Artificial Intelligence Group at University of Patras, named deGREEKLISH.

An open source Greeklish converter, written in the C# programming language, is available as a stand alone program.

== See also ==
- Arabic chat alphabet
