= Swenglish =

English language heavily influenced by Swedish

Swenglish is a colloquial term referring to code-mixing or code-switching between Swedish and English.

== English heavily influenced by Swedish ==
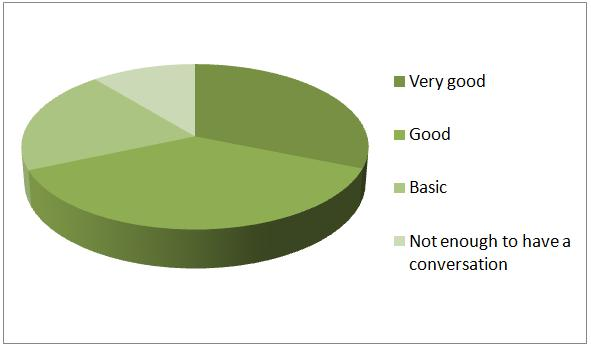
Knowledge of English in Sweden as reported by Swedes, 2005. Very good: 31% Good: 37% Basic: 21% Not enough: 11%

The name Swenglish is a portmanteau term of the names of the two languages and is first recorded from 1938, making it one of the oldest names for a hybrid form of English. Other colloquial portmanteau words for Swenglish include (chronologically): Swinglish (from 1957), Swedlish (1995) and Sweglish (1996).

=== Pronunciation ===
Swedish is characterised by a strong word stress and phrase prosody that differs from that of English.

There are words that are similar in meaning and pronunciation, that have different stress patterns. For example, verbs that end with -era in Swedish are often French loanwords, where the French word ends with a stressed -er. The Swedish word gets its stress point at the same place, but this is not true in English. A native Swedish speaker might mispronounce generate by following the pattern of the Swedish generera [jɛnɛˈrěːra].

Swedish is a pitch accent language. Accent 1 is a low-high-low contour and accent 2 is a high-low-high-low contour, with the second peak in the second syllable. This can give Swenglish speakers a "singing" quality to their speech. Particularly when exaggerating their Swedish accent in English, speakers add an extra cadence to their words that most native English speakers lack.

Swedish lacks many common English phonemes. These are sometimes replaced by similar-sounding Swedish phonemes, or other English phonemes that are easier to pronounce. For example, when using the nearest Swedish vowels for the English words beer and bear, a native Swedish speaker might pronounce both as [beːr]. In general, Swenglish will sound very articulated, due to Swedish vowels being more strongly articulated and not as often reduced to schwas.

Swedish also lacks some consonant phonemes common in English, such as voiceless dental fricative /θ/, which is typically realized as labiodental [f] or a voiceless dental stop [t̪], leading to three being pronounced as "free" or "tree". Other missing consonants include voiced dental fricative /ð/, which is typically realized as a voiced dental stop [d̪]), voiced alveolar fricative /z/, which is typically realized voicelessly [s] and voiced palato-alveolar fricative /dʒ/, which is realized voicelessly [tʃ], somewhat more back [ʈʂ], or as a voiced palatal approximant [j] or fricative [ʝ].

There are examples of Swenglish being used in Sweden as a means of brand management. The Swedish telecommunications company Tele2 has long aired commercials with a black sheep called Frank. The pun of the commercials, extolling inexpensive service, is based on the English word cheap, which usually is pronounced as "sheep" by Swedes—hence Frank.

=== Vocabulary and grammar ===
As with most non-native speech, native Swedish speakers may pick the wrong word when speaking English based on what sounds right in their own language. While Swedish and English share many words, both from their Germanic origins, and from later French and Latin influence, there are several Swedish-English false friends, such as nacke (similar to English "neck") meaning 'nape, back of the neck', and eventuellt (similar to "eventually") meaning 'possibly'. Some loanwords have a more specific meaning in Swedish than the original English, such as keyboard meaning only 'electronic keyboard, synthesizer'. Compare the list of Swedish-English false friends on Swedish Wikipedia.

Many Swedish compounds and expressions translate directly into English, but many others do not, even if the translations can be understood. For instance, the Swedish ta med means 'bring', but is often translated as the literal "take with".

=== Controversies ===
In June 2010, BP's Swedish chairman Carl-Henric Svanberg famously caused a PR uproar after the Deepwater Horizon oil spill by referring to the common people as "the small people". This was influenced by the Swedish expression småfolket.

In December 2019, climate activist Greta Thunberg was criticised by some right-wing commentators after saying said politicians should be put "against the wall", a term which in English can be interpreted as execution by firing squad. She later apologised, saying "... that's Swenglish: 'att ställa någon mot väggen' (to put someone against the wall) means to hold someone accountable", and that she is against violence.

=== Svengelska ===
The Swedish language term svengelska refers not to Swenglish, but to spoken or written Swedish filled with an inordinate amount of English syntax and words, with the latter sometimes respelled according to the norms of Swedish phonetics, or calqued into Swedish.

English has become the lingua franca in many Swedish workplaces. Swedish speakers often modify English business-specific terms with Swedish endings, such as peaken, ('the peak' [of the season]), spotrater 'spot rates', and cancellera 'cancel'.

== See also ==
- Non-native pronunciations of English
- Svorsk
- Språkförsvaret
