= Engrish =

Slang term for broken English

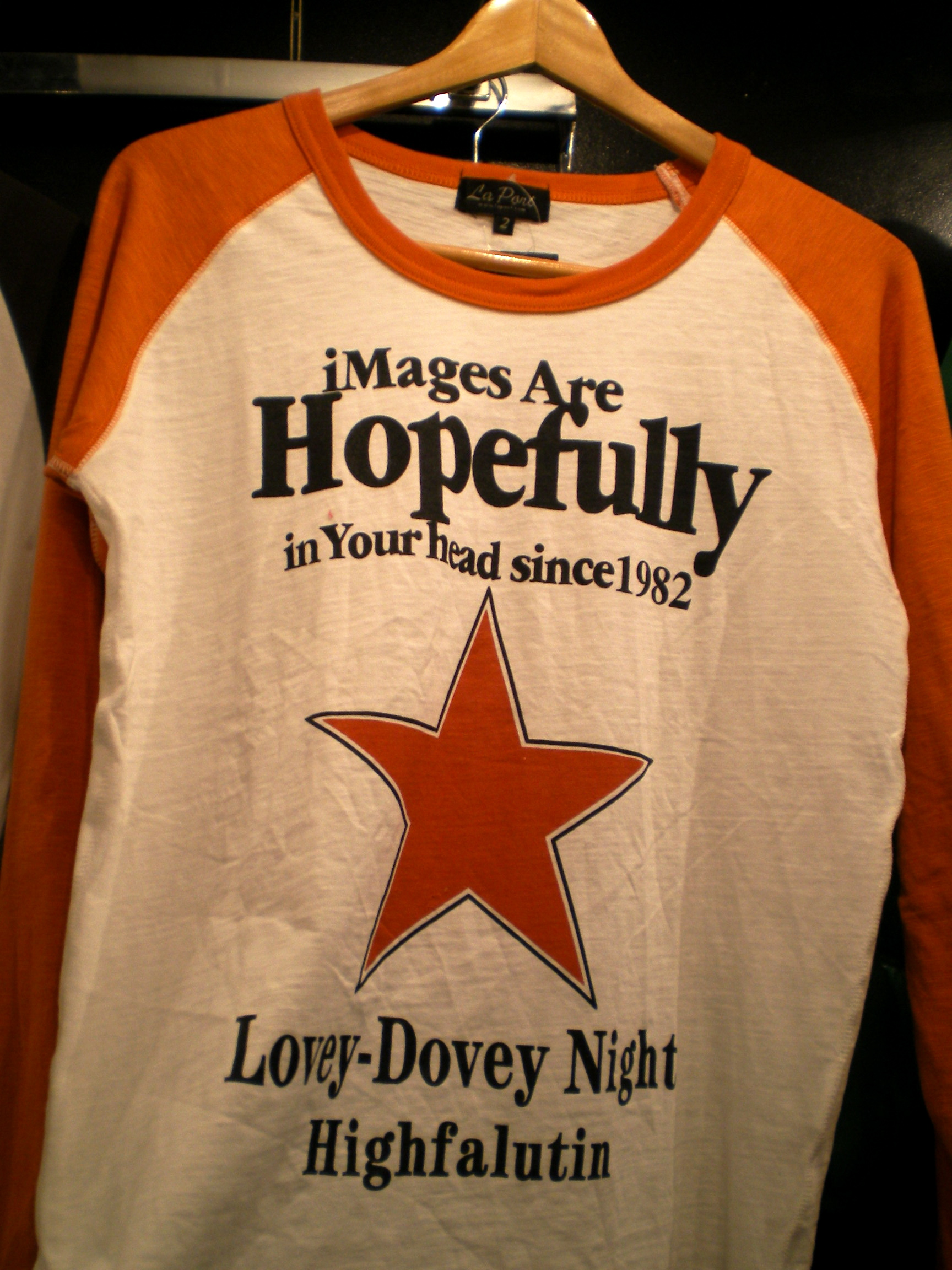
Engrish text on a Japanese T-shirt as a form of decoration

Engrish is a slang term for the inaccurate, poorly translated, nonsensical or ungrammatical use of the English language by native speakers of other languages. The word itself relates to Japanese speakers' tendency to struggle to pronounce the English /l/ and /r/ distinctly arising from the fact Japanese has only one liquid phoneme (usually romanized r), but its definition encompasses many more errors. Terms such as Japanglish, Japlish, Jinglish, or Janglish are more specific to Japanese Engrish. The related Japanese term wasei-eigo (和製英語: 'Japanese-made English') refers to pseudo-anglicisms that have entered everyday Japanese. The slang has also been used in a negative context. It has been used in discrimination, or linguicism, which involves prejudice. The term is used when some people are judged and treated negatively.

The term Engrish first appears in the 1940s (suggestive of a mispronunciation of English) but it was not until the 1980s that it began to be used as a byname for defective Asian English. While the term may refer to spoken English, it often describes written English. Engrish can be found in many places, including signs, menus, and advertisements. The words are frequently humorous to speakers of English.

In Japan, for example, it is common to add English text to items for decorative and fashion purposes (see cool). Such text is often added to create a cosmopolitan feeling rather than to be read by native English speakers, and so may often be meaningless or grammatically incorrect.

== Japanese Engrish / Japanglish ==
Japanese and English have significantly different grammar: Japanese word order, the frequent omission of subjects in Japanese, the absence of articles, a near-complete absence of consonant clusters, and difficulties in distinguishing /l/ and /r/, or /θ/ and /s/ sounds, all contribute to substantial problems using Standard English effectively. Japanese people have tended to score comparatively poorly on international tests of English.

Further, English is frequently used in Japan (and elsewhere) for aesthetic rather than functional purposes; i.e., for Japanese consumption, not for English speakers per se, as a way of appearing "smart, sophisticated and modern", in much the same way as Japanese and similar writing scripts are used in Western fashion. Such decorative English is not meant to be read and understood by native English speakers, so emphasis is not placed on coherence or accuracy.

The Japanese language also makes extensive use of loanwords, especially from English in recent decades, and these words are transliterated into a Japanese form of pronunciation using the katakana syllabary. Japanese speakers may thus only be familiar with the Japanese pronunciation or Japanese meaning, rather than its original pronunciation or meaning. This is particularly the case when the source English word contains sounds or sound clusters which have no equivalent in katakana.

== In popular culture ==
Engrish has been featured occasionally in South Park, an American animated TV show by Trey Parker and Matt Stone. One example is the song "Let's Fighting Love", used in the episode "Good Times with Weapons", which parodies the poorly translated opening theme sequences sometimes shown in anime. Parker and Stone's feature-length film Team America: World Police (2004) also features Engrish when the North Korean leader Kim Jong-il is depicted singing the song "I'm so Ronery".

The British fashion brand Superdry, which takes inspiration from Japanese clothing styles, has established a style of placing meaningless Japanese text such as "Sunglasses company" and "membership certificate" on clothing sold in Britain. The company explained to a Japanese television news programme that most translations were done using simple automatic translation programs such as Babel Fish, without attempting to make the texts accurate.

Countryball comics often use Engrish for non-Anglosphere countries, typically by replacing certain English words with equivalent words from their native languages or dialects.

== See also ==
- "All your base are belong to us", an internet meme originating from the opening cutscene of the European Mega Drive port of Zero Wing
- Broken English
- Chinglish
- Konglish
- Japanese Pidgin English
- Non-native pronunciations of English
- Perception of English /r/ and /l/ by Japanese speakers
- Portrayal of East Asians in American film and theater
- Singlish
- Wasei-eigo
  - List of wasei-eigo
