= Poglish =

Combination of Polish and English

Poglish, also known as Polglish and Ponglish (Polish: polglisz, język polgielski; German: Ponglisch), is a blend of two words from Polish and English. It is the product of macaronically mixing Polish- and English-language elements (morphemes, words, grammatical structures, syntactic elements, idioms, etc.) within a single speech production, or the use of "false friends" or of cognate words in senses that have diverged from those of the common etymological root.

Such combining or confusion of Polish and English elements, when it occurs within a single word, term, or phrase (e.g., in a hybrid word), may, inadvertently or deliberately, produce a neologism.

Poglish is a common phenomenon among persons bilingual in Polish and English; and is a manifestation of a broader phenomenon, that of language interference. As with the mixing of other language pairs, the results of Poglish speech (oral or written) may sometimes be confusing, amusing, or embarrassing.

Several portmanteau words have been formed, blending the words "Polish" and "English". Polglish (from as early as 1975) was followed by Pinglish (1984), Polilish (1997), Ponglish (2002), and Poglish (2006).

An expression that has been used by some native Polish-speakers to denote the mixing of Polish- and English-language elements in oral or written speech is "half na pół" ("half-and-half").

== Mis-metaphrase ==
One of the two chief approaches to translation, "metaphrase"— also referred to as "formal equivalence", "literal translation", or "word-for-word translation"— must be used with great care especially in relation to idioms. Madeleine Masson, in her biography of the Polish World War II S.O.E. agent Krystyna Skarbek, quotes her as speaking of "lying on the sun" and astutely surmises that this is "possibly a direct translation from the Polish". Indeed, the Polish idiom "leżeć na słońcu" ("to lie on the sun", that is, to sunbathe) is, if anything, only marginally less absurd than its English equivalent, "to lie in the sun".

== "False friends" ==
Some erroneous lexemic substitutions made by Polonia – members of the Polish diaspora – are attributable not to mis-metaphrase but to confusion of similar-appearing words (false cognates or "false friends") which otherwise do not share, respectively, a common etymology or a common meaning.

Thus some Poles living in Anglophone countries, when speaking of "cashing a check", will erroneously say "kasować czek" ("to cancel a check") rather than the correct "realizować czek" ("to cash a check"). Other common examples include the erroneous "wypełniać formę" ("to fill in a mold") rather than "wypełniać formularz" ("to fill in a form"); and "przenosić boksy" ("to move cubicles") rather than "przenosić pudełka" ("to move boxes").

== Latin calques ==
A remarkably high proportion of Polish terms actually have precise metaphrastic equivalents in English, traceable to the fact that both these Indo-European languages have been calqued, since the Middle Ages, on the same Latin roots.

== "Chicago Polish" ==
Some Polish expatriates in Chicago – especially those who have lived there a long time – speak Poglish on a daily basis. A most common feature of their Poglish is the Polonization of English words. A Polonian attempting to speak this kind of Polish-English melange in Poland would have great difficulty making themselves understood.

This phenomenon gained wider attention in Polish social media through the success of Polish-American creator Kasia Mecinski. In a series of videos, she discussed her upbringing within the Chicago Polonia and her adult perspective on her Polish heritage, including her experience with the language. The variety of Polish she uses incorporates numerous "Chicago Polish" words and phrases, sparking discussion among viewers about the perception of Polish dialects that developed outside of both modern and historical Polish borders. In her most popular video on the topic, which garnered over a million views, she quizzed popular Polish creators on the meanings of selected phrases from the so-called szikago gwara ("Chicago dialect"). Notable examples that confused Poles unfamiliar with the dialect included tubajfor ("a two-by-four-inch wooden beam"), garbedź ("a garbage can"), and serios ("cereal").

== In popular culture ==
Anthony Burgess' novel, A Clockwork Orange, has been translated into Polish by Robert Stiller in two versions: one rendered from the book's original English-Russian melange into a Polish-Russian melange as Mechaniczna pomarańcza, wersja R (A Mechanical Orange, version R); the other, into a Polish-English melange as Nakręcana pomarańcza, wersja A ["A" standing for the Polish word for "English"] (A Wind-Up Orange, version A). The latter Polish-English version makes a fairly convincing Poglish text.

BBC Look North (East Yorkshire and Lincolnshire) Television produced a report on Poglish in Boston, Lincolnshire, which has a large Polish population.

A large number of English-derived neologisms exist in Polish, spoken especially by Poland's youth. Phonetically-read English words, such as "szoping" [ˈʂɔpiŋk] ("shopping"), tend to occur, and are seen as slang expressions.

== See also ==
- Bilingualism
- Code-switching
- False friends
- Hybrid word
- Language contact
- Language interference
- Language transfer
- Mixed language
