= Hunglish =

Mixing of the English and Hungarian languages

Hunglish refers to any mixing of the English and Hungarian languages as a result of linguistic interference. This most often involves ungrammatical or awkward English expressions typical of Hungarian learners of English, as well as English words and phrases imported into the Hungarian language. The term is a portmanteau of Hungarian and English. The word is first recorded in 1978. The word is most popular in Northern England, especially in South Yorkshire.

As the prominence and influence of the English language in Hungary increases, Hunglish has also come to refer to the indirect effect of English on the modern-day Hungarian language. Some Hungarians believe this effect to be a negative one, claiming that English influence causes Hungarians to make grammatical, orthographic, and stylistic errors in their own mother tongue, and that traditional Hungarian expressions and terms are being crowded out by ones derived from English. Other Hungarians see this phenomenon as a natural process of linguistic interaction, and believe that features imported from English into Hungarian should be regarded as linguistic developments, rather than grammatical errors.

== Examples in English ==
Characteristic mistakes of Hungarians speaking English include:

- Use of verbs with inappropriate prepositional phrases (e.g. "emlékszem rá" = "I remember on him," "játszani akarok" = "I want to game"). A wide variety of grammatical cases are used in Hungarian to express verb objects; these cases are then mistranslated based on common English translations in other contexts.
- Failure to capitalize proper nouns or adjectives (e.g. "angolórám van hétfőn" = "I have english class on monday"). Many English proper nouns are considered common in Hungarian (such as days, months and languages); the grammar has no concept of proper adjectives at all.
- Omission of the word is (e.g. "a nevem Gábor" = "my name Gábor").
- Ungrammatical use of reflexive pronouns (e.g. "jól érzem magam" = "I feel myself good" rather than "I feel good").
- Use of third-person pronouns in the wrong gender (e.g. "az anyám pénztárcát vett magának" = "my mother bought himself a purse"). Hungarian has only one third-person pronoun, ő, used for both male and female genders. This can be extended to related pronouns, e.g. maga = himself/herself/itself.
- Failure to use the continuous aspect and the imperfect tense, which do not exist in Hungarian (e.g. "aludtam, amikor megérkezett" = "I slept when she arrived" rather than "I was sleeping when she arrived", or "már voltam ott" = "I was already there" instead of "I have already been there").
- Overuse of the definite article the and underuse of the indefinite article a/an (e.g. "a türelem erény" = "the patience is virtue" rather than "patience is a virtue" or "az anyám tanár" = "my mother is teacher" instead of "my mother is a teacher").
- Confusion around the use of "many" and "much", both being represented by the word sok. Similarly, both "fewer" and "less" can be translated as kevesebb.
- Use of "so" instead of "such a/an", e.g. "olyan jó vicc volt" = "it was so nice joke" instead of "it was such a nice joke".

== Examples in Hungarian ==
- The Hungarian word karakter traditionally means "personality," but is now often used as in English to mean "character" as in "the main character of the novel."
- Words which are capitalized in English but traditionally not in Hungarian, such as days of the week and nationalities, are increasingly capitalized in Hungarian as well.
- Idővonal, a calque of the English "timeline" is increasingly used in place of the more traditional words időrend and kronológia.
- Terms that are split into two words in English are increasingly also split in Hungarian, such as szoftver fejlesztő (software developer) in place of the more traditional szoftverfejlesztő.
- Egérpad is often used to mean "mouse pad," superseding the original term egéralátét (lit. "mouse underlay"). Some Hungarians object to this term because the Hungarian pad means "bench," and egérpad therefore literally translates to "mouse bench."
- Words related to technology and the digital word are widely used due to the increasing global influence of American culture, e.g. lolozni ("to play League of Legends") or AI instead of the traditional expression referring to artificial intelligence (MI, mesterséges intelligencia).
- English backchannels are increasingly used by younger generations, e.g. "yes", "no", "nice" and "cool".

== See also ==
- Language interference
- Mixed language
