= Czenglish =

Macaronic form of English

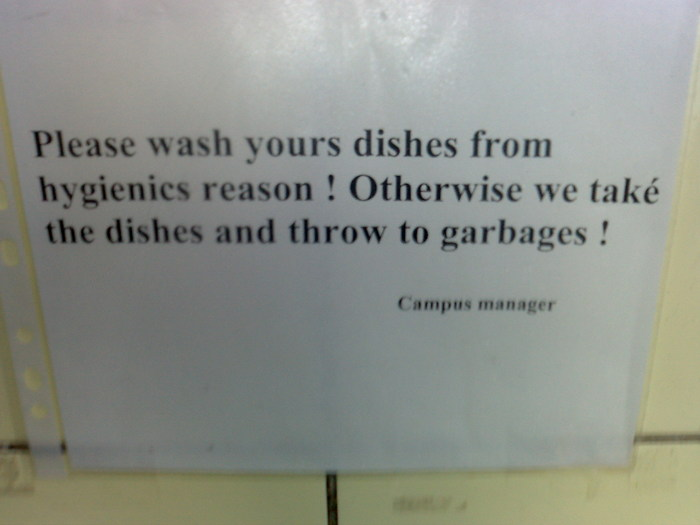
An example of Czenglish at the Campus of Charles University in Prague

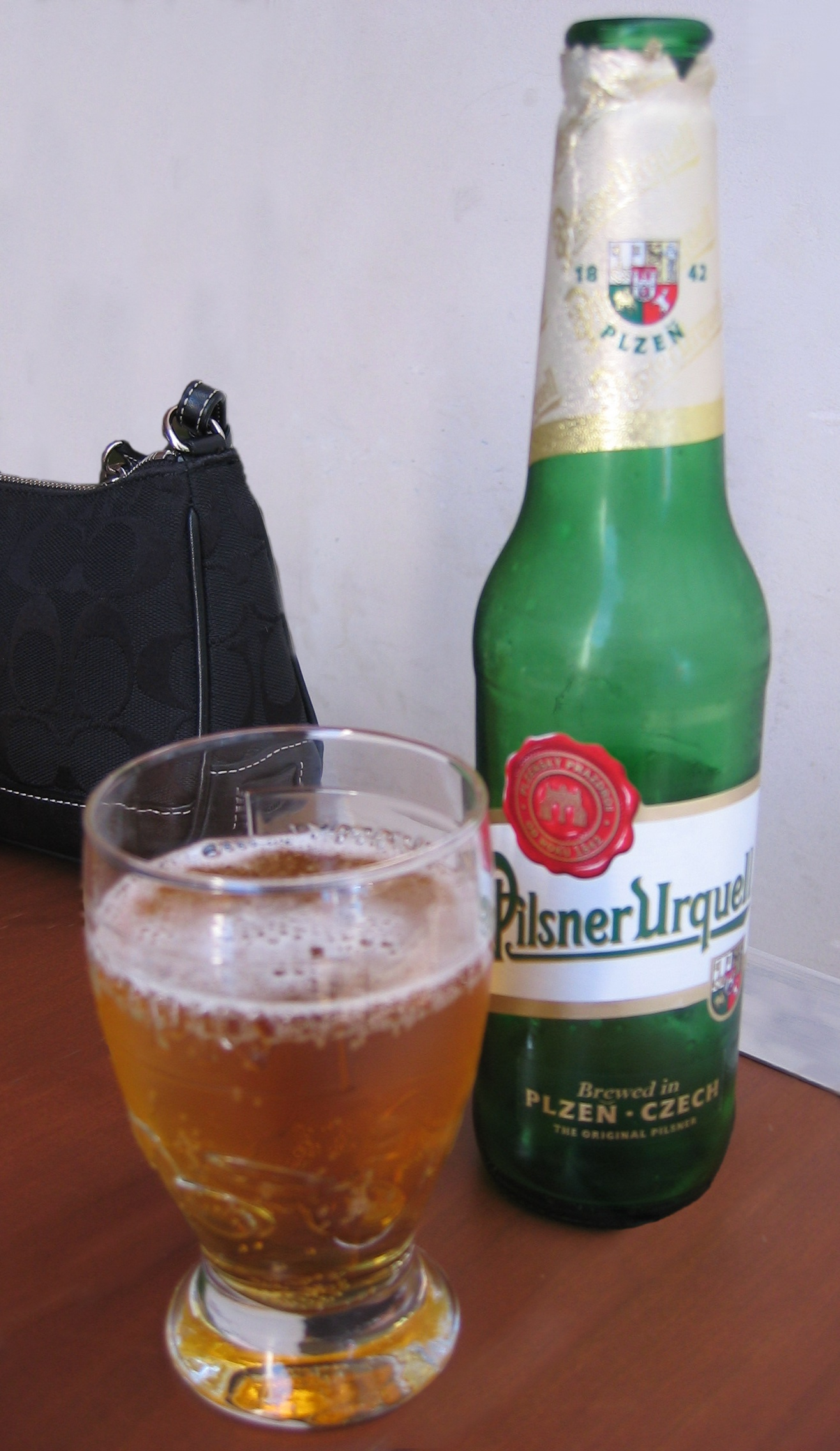
Beer bottle showing the Czech preference for the grammatically incorrect "Brewed in Czech"

Czenglish, a portmanteau of the words Czech and English, refers to the interlanguage of English heavily influenced by Czech pronunciation, vocabulary, grammar or syntax spoken by learners of English as a second language. The term Czenglish is first recorded in 1989, with the slightly earlier variant Czechlish recorded from 1982.

== Characteristics ==
Examples include confusing verbatim translations (such as "basic school" for základní škola, which should be "primary school" or "elementary school"), incorrect word order in a sentence and use of inappropriate prepositions and conjunctions because of the influence of their Czech equivalents.

Another typical aspect is the absence of definite articles (due to the lack of articles in Czech) and the use of "some" in place of an indefinite article. In Czenglish and other Central European accents /θ/ is often pronounced as [s], [t] or [f]; /ð/ as [d], and /r/ as an alveolar trill as in some Scottish accents, rather than the more standard approximant. Voiced consonants at the end of words like "big" are pronounced unvoiced ([bɪk]); "ng" is understood as a /ng/ sequence and therefore follows the final devoicing rule (e.g. to sing merges with to sink [sɪŋk]).

== See also ==
- Bohemisms
