= Tinglish =

English dialect used by Thai people

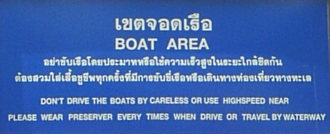
Tinglish is even widespread on official signs in Thailand.

Tinglish (or Thaiglish, Thenglish, Thailish, Thainglish, etc.) refers to code-mixing or code-switching of Thai and English. It is typically produced by native Thai speakers due to language interference from Thai. Differences from standard native English occur in pronunciation, vocabulary, and grammar. The term was coined in 1970, and several alternative terms have been proposed since its inception, such as Thainglish (1973), Thaiglish (1992), Tinglish (1994), Thinglish (1976), Thenglish (2003), and Tenglish (2012).

== Characteristics and examples ==
Characteristics and examples (direct translation) include:

- non-rhoticity
- omission of pronouns
- zero copula
- use of present tense + already, in contrast to past tense of Standard English (but similar to the recent past tense in Irish English)
- non-standard use or omissions of articles, declension, prepositions, and conjugation.
- addition of Thai final particles, e.g., I don’t know na
- any and every are used interchangeably
- different use of conditional constructions
- no use of double negatives
- moving "s" on singular verbs to the subject, for instance "He's talk too much" instead of "He talks too much"
- omission of prepositions, for instance "I wait you" instead of "I'll wait for you" or "I listen him" for "I listened to him".
- "very" and "very much" are used interchangeably, for instance "I very love my daughter" and "She beautiful very much".

=== Examples of words and phrases ===
Examples (direct translation) include:

Phrase	Meaning
Same same	Similar, as usual
Open/close (for any electrical appliance)	Turn on/off the appliance
No have (or any verb) ...	There is no ..., I do not have a ...
I send you airport	I will take you to the airport
I have ever been to London	I have been to London
I'm interesting in football	I am interested in football
I very like it	I really like it, I like it very much
I used to go Phuket	I have been to Phuket before
They black	They're dark skinned/tanned
Are you boring?	Do you feel bored?
play internet/phone	I'm using the internet/my phone
Check bill (bill being pronounced as "bin")	Can I have the bill, please?
Where you go?	Where are you going?

== Pronunciation ==
As some sounds in English do not exist in the Thai language, this affects the way native Thai speakers pronounce English words, as displayed in loanwords.

=== Adaptation of consonants ===
English consonants with corresponding sounds in Thai are simply carried over, while others are adapted to a similar-sounding consonant.

- /g/, /z/, and /dʒ/ are devoiced to /k/, /s/, and /tɕ/: "goal" → /kōː/, "zip" → /síp/, "jam" → /tɕɛ̄ːm/.
- /ʃ/ and /tʃ/ become /tɕʰ/ in onset position and /t/ in the coda position: "shirt" and "church" → /tɕʰɤ́ːt/.
- The "th" sounds /θ/ and /ð/ are replaced by /t/ or /d/ in the onset position, but are always replaced by /t/ in the coda position: "three" → /trīː/, "then" → /dēn/.
- Initial /v/ is replaced by /w/ in the onset position, whereas /v/ and /f/ in the coda position are often replaced by either /p/ or /f/ depending on speaker: "seven" → /sēːwên/, "have" → /hɛ́ːp/ or /hɛ́ːf/.
- Onset consonant clusters with /s/ as the first consonant do not occur in Thai, so /ə/ is added between these consonants: "start" → /sə.táːt/.
- /l/ in the coda position often renders to /w/: "grill" → /krīw/.
- Final consonant clusters are generally truncated to only the sound directly after the vowel: "lunch" → /lán/.
- /r/ can be pronounced as /l/ or dropped when part of a consonant cluster or in the coda position.

=== Adaptation of vowels ===
When it comes to vowels, there are 21 phonemes in Thai compared with 15 vowels in English; therefore, it is relatively easy for Thai people to imitate the English vowels. However, the two systems have a significant discrepancy: Thai vowels are distinguished by shortness and length, while for English, it is laxness and tenseness. That explains why Thai English speakers perceive and produce lax sounds as short sounds and tense sounds as long sounds, which gives their pronunciation its uniqueness.

- Diphthongs and triphthongs are generally simplified to long vowels, such as the /ei/ in "blade" becoming /eː/. Exceptions are diphthongs ending in /i/ and /u/, which are instead reanalysed as the Thai diphthongs ending in /j/ and /w/: "tie" → /tʰāj/, "view" → /wīw/.

=== Tone assignment ===
All Thai syllables must have one of five tones (mid, low, falling, high, rising). English words adapted into Thai are systematically given these tones according to certain rules. English loanwords are often unusual in that tone markers are normally omitted, meaning that they are often pronounced with a different tone from that indicated by their spelling.

- Monosyllabic words that end in sonorants take the mid tone, while those that end in obstruents either take the low tone or the high tone, with the high tone predominant.
- For polysyllabics, the nonfinal consonants follow similar rules to monosyllabics, although they always take high tone when ending in obstruents.
- The tone of final consonants that end in sonorants depend on where the stress falls in the original English word. If the final syllable is stressed, the mid tone is taken, while non-final stress correlates with the falling tone being taken.
- Final consonants ending in obstruents take the low, high, or falling tone in descending order of frequency.

As Thai is a tonal language whose syllables take approximately the same time to pronounce, Thai people often have difficulty with English word stress. They, instead, stress the last syllable by adding high pitch.
