= Jewish English varieties =

Language varieties of English used by Jews

Jewish English is a cover term for varieties of the English language spoken by Jews. They may include significant amounts of vocabulary and syntax taken from Yiddish, and both classical and modern Hebrew. These varieties can be classified into several types: Yeshivish, Yinglish, and Heblish, as well as more flexible mixtures of English and other Jewish languages, which may contain features and other elements from languages other than Yiddish and Hebrew.

The classification "Jewish English" eliminates the need for concern with identifying the specific origin of the non-English components of any such variant. This offsets, for example, misperceptions that can result from failure to note the Hebrew origin of a word that may have become widely known in Anglophone contexts via Yiddish, and may be, therefore, simply regarded as Yiddish. (This problem is illustrated in the list of English words of Yiddish origin.)

== Variants ==
Several terms for hybrid Jewish English are being used or have been suggested.

A set of terms refer to hybrids or mixtures of English and Yiddish rather than with Hebrew, and code-switching may be for representation of religious or cultural affiliation in speech, rather than language transfer reasons. In the US these include: Yinglish, Yidgin English, Yidlish, Yiddiglish, Ameridish, Anglish, Heblish, Engdish, Engliddish, Engbrew, Englibrew, Jewish English, Jewish Dialect, Frumspeak, Yeshivish, Hebonics, Judeo-English.

=== Hebrish ===
Heblish or Hebrish, less frequently Hebglish or Englibrew, Engbrew, all blends of the words "Hebrew" and "English", refer to any combination of the two languages, or to code-switching between the languages.

The term Heblish was recorded earliest in 1979, with Hebrish (1989) and Hebglish (1993) appearing later. Other less common terms are Hinglish (recorded from 1982) and Henglish (1983). After that the public came back to using the term "Hebrish".

== Ideologies of American Jews ==
Linguist Sharon Avni published a book describing how Hebrew shapes the ideologies of American Jews, with many seeing at as part of their identity as Jews.

== See also ==
- Hebraization of English (or Hebraicization), the use of the Hebrew alphabet to write English
- Yiddish words used in English
- List of English words of Yiddish origin
