= Simple English =

Simple English may refer to:

- Basic English, a controlled language created by Charles Kay Ogden, which only contains a small number of words
- Plain English, restricted to simple terms
- Learning English, a version of English used by the Voice of America broadcasting service
- New General Service List of nearly three thousand English words
- Simplified Technical English, a controlled language originally developed for aerospace industry maintenance manuals

== See also ==
- Simple English Wikipedia
- Simple English Wiktionary
- Easy read
- Simple language (disambiguation)
