= Globish (Nerrière) =

Subset of standard English grammar and vocabulary

- Pronunciation: /ˈɡləʊbɪʃ/
- Created by: Jean-Paul Nerrière
- Date: 2004
- Setting and usage: international auxiliary language
- Purpose: Constructed language: Globish
- Early forms: Old English: Middle English; Early Modern English; Modern English
- Sources: vocabulary from a list of 1500 English words, and grammar based on a subset of standard English grammar

Language codes
- ISO 639-3: –

Globish is a name for a subset of the English language formalized in 2004 by Jean-Paul Nerrière. It uses a subset of standard English grammar and a list of 1500 English words. Nerrière claims that it is "not a language" in and of itself, but rather it is the common ground that non-native English speakers adopt in the context of international business.

"Globish," a trademark, is a portmanteau of "global" and "English." The first attested reference to the term as Global English, i.e., to refer to a set of dialects of English spoken outside of traditional English-speaking areas, was in an issue of The Christian Science Monitor in 1997:

Indeed, the "globish" of world youth culture is more and more interactive. Non-Western forms of English now are as creative and lively as Chaucerian or Shakespearean or Dickensian English once were.

Nerrière's project differs from a controlled language of the same name devised by Madhukar Gogate six years earlier.

== Usage ==
Jean-Paul Nerrière uses the term Globish for his subset of the English grammar and vocabulary. He claims that the language described in his books is naturally occurring. He has marked his codification of that language by acquiring trademark protection on the term, similar to I.A. Richards who trademarked Basic English in order to prevent dilution and misrepresentation of his work. Instances of attested prior usage, it can be seen, were incidental or not intended for the same purpose.

== Development ==
As an IBM executive and as a result of his vast travels, Jean-Paul Nerrière realized that a new global language was becoming more and more important. While serving as vice president of international marketing at IBM, Jean-Paul Nerriere first observed patterns of English that non-native English speakers used to communicate with each other in international conferences. In 1989, he proposed Globish as an international language focussing most of his efforts to its promotion. He developed rules and training in the form of various publications to help non-native English speakers better communicate with each other by using Globish as a lingua franca. He conducted dozens of interviews and wrote or co-authored 6 books about Globish in four different languages.

== Promotion and publications ==
Nerrière formulated his ideas in two books he authored, Découvrez le globish (meaning Discover the Globish) and Do Not Speak English, Parlez Globish. Both books have been translated into a number of international languages. In French, he has published Parlez globish!: l'anglais planétaire du troisième millénaire and co-authored with Philippe Dufresne and Jacques Bourgon, the instruction book Découvrez le globish: l'anglais allégé en 26 étapes.

Nerrière's 2004 codification work began to legitimize the language purpose to the extent it drew some press attention. Clearly, and with much subsequent reference, the term Globish has grown increasingly as a generic term since the date of his first publications. Nerrière trademarked Globish as a subset of the English language formalized by him. He also launched the website globish.com to promote his ideas.

In 2009, intending to demonstrate that "Good Globish is correct English", Nerriere and David Hon published Globish the World Over, the first book written entirely in Globish-English. Robert McCrum, literary editor of The Observer, is quoted as supporting the efficacy of the language. By 2011, Globish the World Over had been translated into 12 languages including French, German, Spanish, Italian, Russian, Japanese, Chinese, Polish, Hungarian, Slovak, Uzbek etc. It was a best seller in Japan.

In 2011, the Globish Foundation was formed as a non-profit organization in Australia, for the purpose of maintaining and promulgating the standards of Globish. By 2013, the Globish Foundation had 8 national affiliates and an online Globish Communications Test available 24/7.

Barbara Cassin claims that Globish is not a language of culture, but a language of service. Robert McCrum wrote the book Globish: How the English Language Became the World's Language (ISBN 9780393062557), describing Globish as an economic phenomenon, unlike "global English" whose uses are much more diverse than just business.

== Related systems ==
Special English is also a controlled subset of the English language with about 1500 words, short sentences, and slower delivery than traditional English. Special English was first used on October 19, 1959, and is still presented daily by the United States broadcasting service Voice of America.

Specialized English is a controlled subset of the English language derived from Special English by Feba Radio. It also has about 1500 words, with some differences in the word list from Special English.

== Criticism ==
Critics of Globish either feel that its codifications are not sufficiently clearly rendered, or that an artificial language is preferable to any natural one.

- Although Nerrière claims that the Globish described in his book is a natural language, he has never published any statistical evidence of his observations. Joachim Grzega, a German linguist, has even gone as far as to state "Obviously, it is not based on any empirical observations, neither on native–non-native nor on non-native–non-native discourse."
- Globish is suspected of cultural imperialism, because it spreads only one language from which the subset of words is taken: this criticism is often by the speakers of other "neutral" languages, meant as languages not spoken in any nation. Clearly, derivative forms which have "English" in their titles are doubly suspect. According to CIA's The World Factbook, native English speakers represent only 4.68% of the world population, including native and non-native speakers the total proportion of all English speakers is estimated to be 10–15%.
- Globish is criticized for having an ulterior economic motive. It is a registered trademark and some marketing is done with it, since its owner did not renounce his rights to it (as for example L. L. Zamenhof did for Esperanto; on the other hand, I.A. Richards discussed why he trademarked Basic English, in order to prevent dilution and misrepresentation).
- The Globish Text Scanner accepts some 2000 extra words.

== See also ==
- Anglish
- Controlled natural language
- Engrish
- Globish (Gogate)
- International auxiliary language
- List of dialects of the English language
- Newspeak
- Simple English (disambiguation)
