= Easy Japanese =

Simplified Japanese

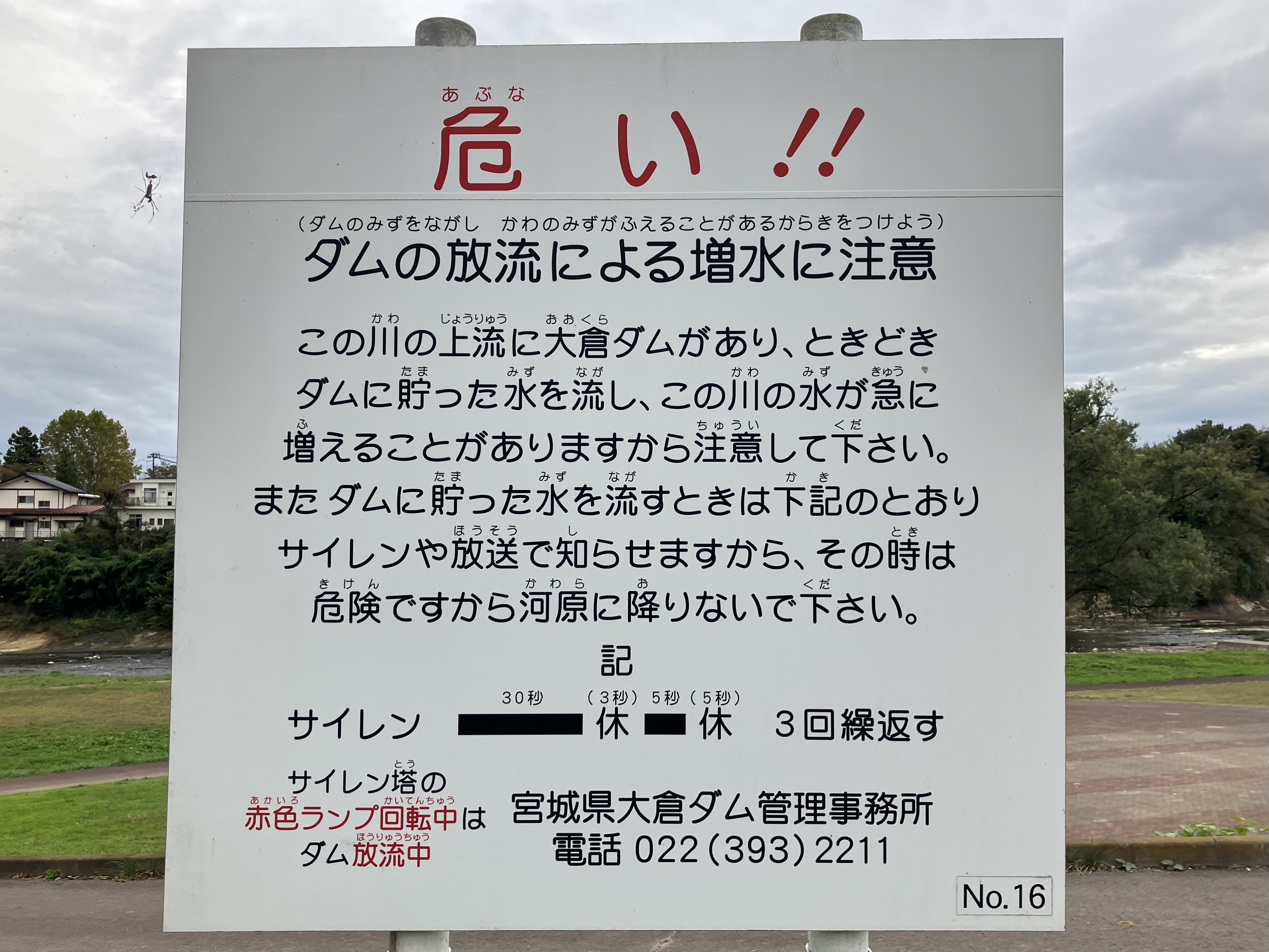
A warning sign written in Easy Japanese.

Easy Japanese (やさしい日本語, yasashii nihongo) is a controlled natural language based on the Japanese language that is designed to be easy to understand for children and foreigners who have limited proficiency in Japanese by using simple expressions, simplified sentence structure, and furigana (kana indicating the pronunciation of kanji).

== Guidelines ==
Easy Japanese limits the length and complexity of sentences, as well as standardizes the choice of words and particles.

- Use an average of 24 characters per sentence.
- Use an average of 6 clauses per sentence.
- Use an average of 3-4 kanji per sentence.
- Use "ni (に)" to indicate direction, rather than "he (へ)" or "de (で)", which are less common in standard Japanese.
- Use "wa (は)" to indicate the subject of the sentence, rather than "ga (が)".
- Use "suru koto ga dekiru (することができる)" to indicate possibility, rather than "reru (れる)" or "rareru (られる)".
- Use "shite kudasai (してください)" as an imperative, rather than "shimashou (しましょう)"

== In natural disaster mitigation ==
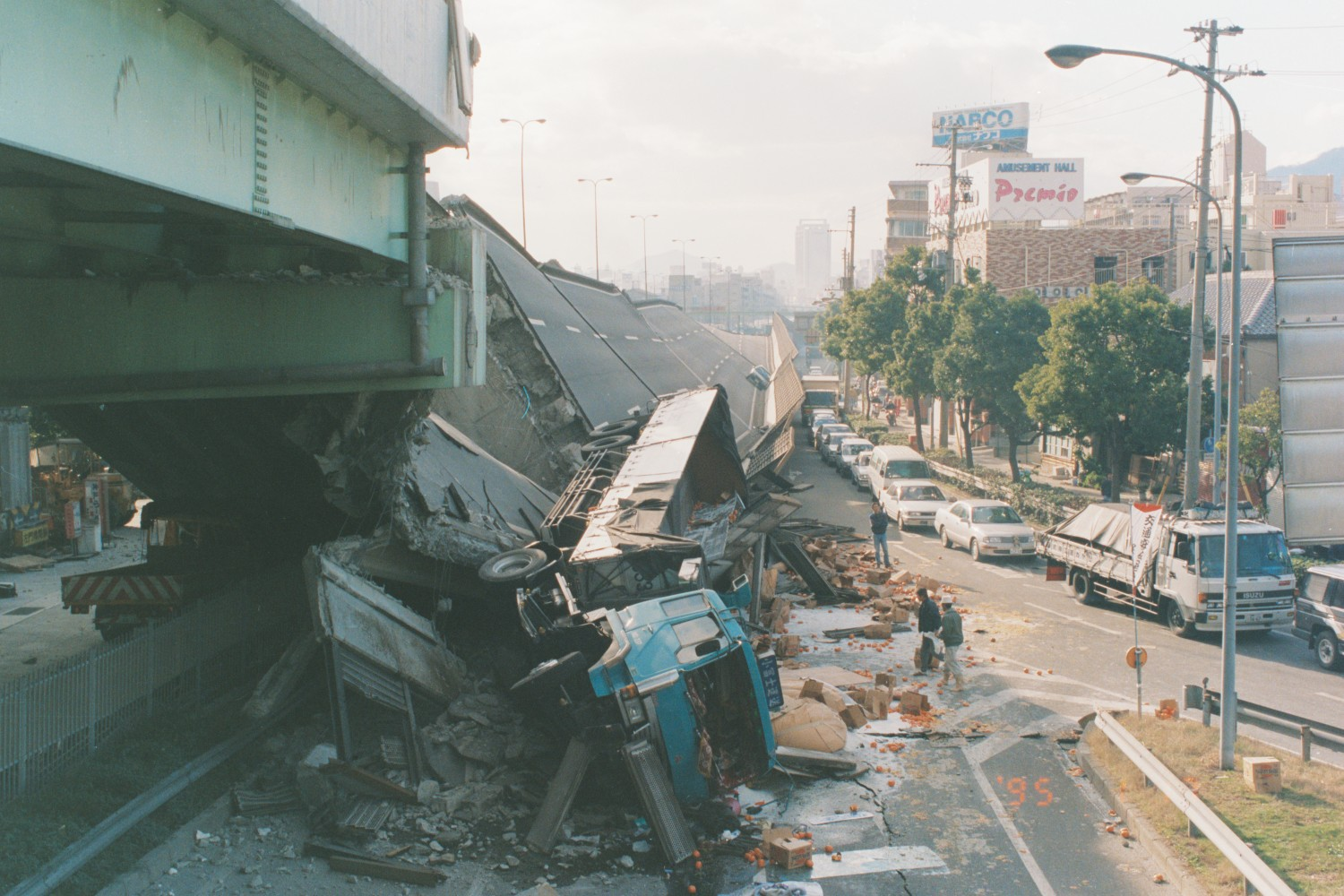
Damage from the Great Hanshin Earthquake

In the Great Hanshin Earthquake of 1995, many foreign residents were affected by the disaster just as the native Japanese were. According to subsequent surveys, they had difficulty understanding information about evacuation centers and lifelines. The native languages of foreign residents in Japan vary widely, and it is very difficult to immediately translate the information into multiple languages when a disaster strikes.

Facing this issue, Kazuyuki Sato and his colleagues at Hirosaki University researched and devised Easy Japanese, a concise and well-defined variation of Japanese that could be easily understood by people at the former Level 3 of the Japanese Language Proficiency Test (incorporating grammar learned in the 3rd-grade elementary school). In March 1999, the Hirosaki University Sociolinguistics Laboratory website published the Manual for Helping Foreigners in the Event of a Disaster (Hirosaki Edition), a collection of specific suggestions and maps for communicating about disasters and evacuations in Easy Japanese. This manual can be used anywhere in Japan by replacing certain parts, such as place names. It was expanded and revised in 2005 and 2013 to include information on planned power outages and calls for water conservation.

In addition, a pamphlet explaining Easy Japanese and guidelines for creating the pamphlet are available free of charge for download and printing. In 2016, the Dictionary of Easy Japanese Terms was created and made available free of charge. It contains approximately 7,600 words relevant to daily life information in situations after a disaster occurs.

Easy Japanese was in use by the governments of all 47 prefectures of Japan by June 2018.

== In tourism ==
The Easy Japanese Tourism Research Group (やさしい日本語ツーリズム研究会) was established in 2016, starting in Yanagawa, Fukuoka. The organization recommended Easy Japanese during a period of rising tourism in Japan as a way to improve the quality of hospitality provided to foreign tourists. Previously, Easy Japanese was mostly a subject of research for disaster mitigation and other governmental communications.

== In the medical field ==
In 2018, the Tokyo International Communication Committee asked 100 foreigners living in Tokyo about their greatest difficulties in navigating life in Japan, and 56% of respondents cited medical care. Easy Japanese was determined by the Ministry of Health, Labour and Welfare to be a practical solution, indicating that medical professionals should be trained in Easy Japanese to better facilitate communication with patients who are not native Japanese speakers.

Ten tips for practicing Easy Japanese in the medical field have been introduced by the Hyogo Medical Practitioners Association:

- Organize your thoughts before speaking.
- Keep sentences short and use clear word endings to separate sentences and end sentences with desu (です) or masu (ます).
- Avoid honorific forms (sonkeigo) and humble forms (kenjōgo). Use polite forms (teineigo) instead.
- Do not prefix words with "o (御)" (to the extent possible).
- Use native Japanese words rather than Sino-Japanese words (words of Chinese origin).
- Avoid excessive use of foreign loanwords.
- Rephrase expressions to increase the chance of their comprehension.
- Use gestures and actual objects.
- Do not use onomatopoeia.
- Do not use Easy Japanese when speaking with a person with a high fluency in Japanese because it can be seen as rude.

== As a common language ==
As of December 2019, the number of foreign residents in Japan has more than tripled since 30 years ago. According to a nationwide survey conducted in 2008 by the National Center for Japanese Language Education and Information of the National Institute for Japanese Language and Linguistics (NINJAL), targeting foreign residents on "Japanese for daily life", 62.6% of the respondents chose Japanese as the language they have no trouble with in their daily life, while 44.0% chose English.

The research group led by Isao Iori views compensatory education as necessary for foreign immigrants who will become indispensable for supporting Japanese society in the future. They also advocate that instead of forcing foreigners to learn Japanese, Japan should use Easy Japanese as a minimum common language during the immigrants' adjustment process.

In 2010, Nihongo Koredake (Just This Much Japanese) was published as a textbook for local Japanese language classes. The authors have been giving lectures and workshops in various places. In August 2020, the Immigration Services Agency of Japan and the Agency for Cultural Affairs published Guidelines for Resident Support in Easy Japanese. This is a guideline that focuses primarily on the written Easy Japanese.

The Miyagi Gakuin Women's University has a program which translates Japanese literature into Easy Japanese.

== See also ==
- Basic English
- Français Fondamental
- Globish
- New General Service List
- Plain English
- Plain language
- Readability
- Swadesh list
