= Easy read =

Method of presenting written information

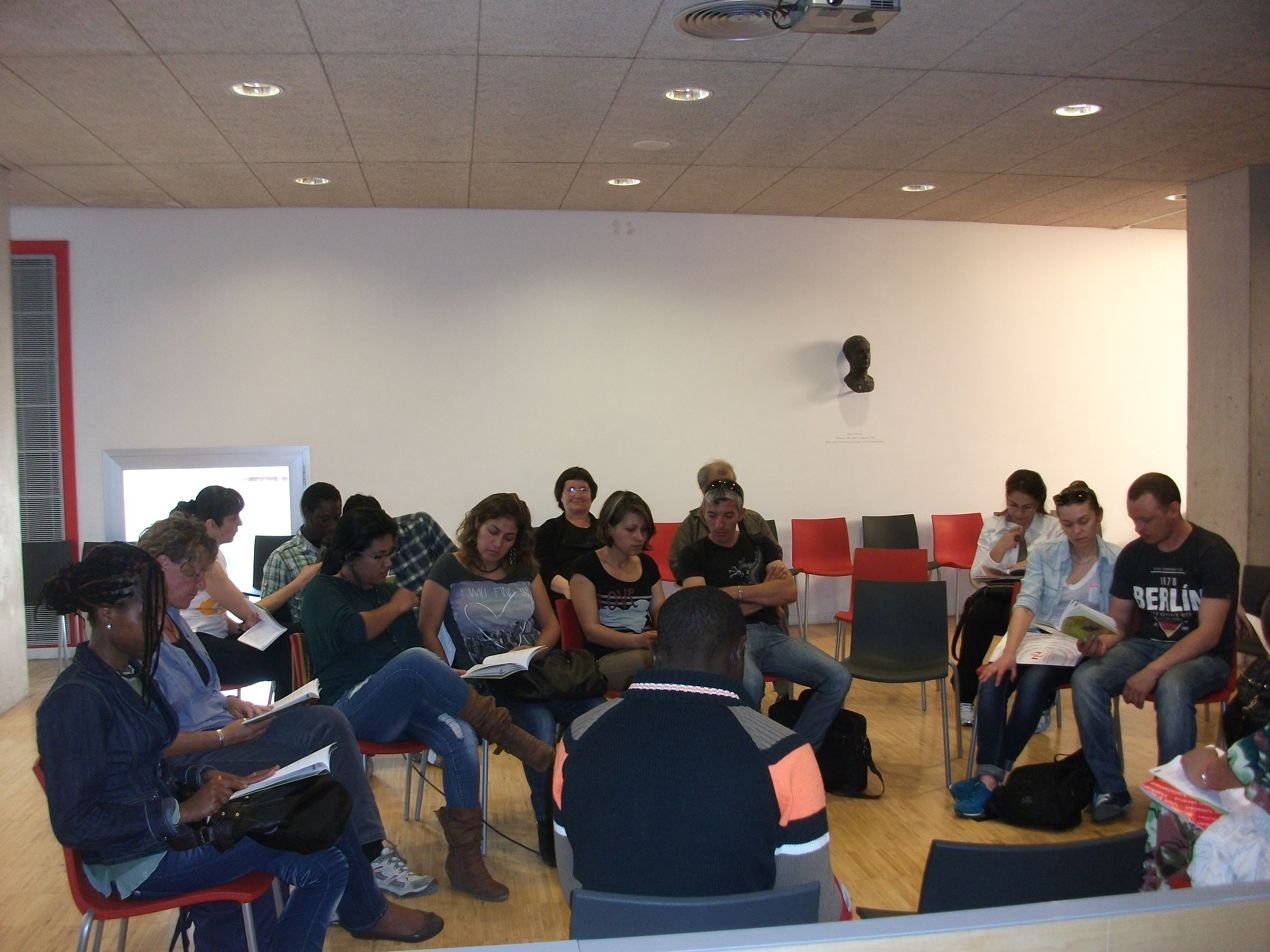
Easy Reading Club to the Tortosa Library in Spain c. 2013

Easy read refers to a range of practices for adapting written information. Despite limited and mixed evidence regarding its effectiveness, easy read has increasingly been promoted in public policy and organisational guidelines as a way of improving access to information for people with intellectual disabilities.

== Standards and guidance ==
Several government and organisational guidelines provide recommendations for producing easy read documents. Common suggestions include using sentences of 10–16 words, active voice, sans-serif fonts of at least 14-point size, bullet points, defining "hard" words, and including images.

The plain English statement: "Thank you for your letter asking for permission to put up a poster in the library; before we can give you an answer, we will need to see a copy of the poster to assure that it won't offend anyone." could be rewritten in easy read as follows: "Thank you for your letter about your poster; we need to see the poster to check that it won't upset people, then we may decide if you may put it up."

There is no formal accreditation or certification system for producing easy read documents. While some jurisdictions, such as the United Kingdom, provide guidance through government and organisational publications, practices vary widely, and there is little consensus among producers about the interpretation of the guidelines, how materials should be created or tested. Consequently, actual easy read documents differ in format, assumed reading level, and use of images.

In January 2026, Photosymbols Ltd published the first evidence-based easy read standard, developed using findings from the Newton Project research study involving over 100 people with learning disabilities across more than 20 self-advocacy organisations in the United Kingdom. The standard sets out principles for easy read covering words, pictures, design, and the involvement of people with learning disabilities. It is presented as a living document intended to evolve as further research and practice-based evidence emerges.

== Easy read in leisure literature (Australia) ==
In Australia, easy read has traditionally been used for government, health, and service information. In recent years, the format has also been applied to leisure-reading literature, including fiction, storytelling projects, and creative writing designed with and for adults with intellectual disability.

Writer and disability advocate Casey Gray has been recognised for applying easy read principles to recreational reading and community storytelling projects. Her work focuses on increasing access to reading for enjoyment, rather than instruction, using simplified language, clear structure, and visual support.

Between 2024 and 2025, several easy read creative works were submitted for legal deposit in Australia, including fiction and community storytelling publications. These works are catalogued by the National Library of Australia, reflecting early recognition of easy read leisure literature within national collections.

Easy read leisure literature has also been supported through public libraries, writers’ festivals, and disability organisations, contributing to discussion about access, choice, and gatekeeping in literature for adults with intellectual disability.

== Effectiveness and criticism ==
There is little research evidence to confirm whether this combination of features improves comprehension or reduces cognitive load for people with intellectual disabilities.

Some studies and narrative accounts report that easy read is positively received by certain people with intellectual disabilities, as well as their supporters. These studies describe affective benefits, such as participants reporting that they felt acknowledged or included, even though comprehension outcomes were limited or unchanged.

Published peer reviewed studies challenge the effectiveness of easy read. A 2017 meta-narrative review found no clear evidence that easy read health information leads to improved understanding or health outcomes for people with intellectual disabilities when disseminated as public information. A 2017 study found that easy read texts did not result in more effective understanding of content compared to standard versions, even when additional support was provided.

More recent peer-reviewed research published after 2020 has expanded on these findings, suggesting that the effectiveness of easy read materials is highly context-dependent. While evidence remains mixed regarding whether easy read consistently improves comprehension outcomes, several studies indicate that easy read may support engagement, participation, or feelings of inclusion for some people with intellectual disabilities, particularly when materials are used alongside supportive mediation or developed with user involvement.

Research suggests that easy read materials may be of limited benefit for people with low literacy skills, and may not address additional barriers such as difficulties with decoding text, working memory limitations, or lack of prior knowledge, which can affect comprehension for some people with intellectual disabilities. Some studies indicate that the use of easy read materials can result in confusion, misunderstandings and disengagement. Several authors suggest that these limitations highlight the need for more flexible, participatory, and multimodal approaches to accessible information, rather than reliance on simplified written text alone.

== See also ==
- Basic English, a controlled language, created by Charles Kay Ogden, which only contains a small number of words
- Learning English (version of English), used by the Voice of America broadcasting service
- Plain English unequivocal word list
- New General Service List simple word list
- Simplified Technical English, a controlled language originally developed for aerospace industry maintenance manuals
- Leichte Sprache, simplified German
- Plain language
