= Leichte Sprache =

Leichte Sprache (German: [ˈlaɪçtə ˈʃpʁaːxə]; LS, literally: easy language) is a specific (usually written) version of the German language. It is directed to people who have low competences in German or in reading in general. The rules are published by the German association Netzwerk Leichte Sprache, which was established in 2006. The rules deal with the creation of sentences and the choice of words and makes recommendations about typography and the use of media. The content is often simplified as well, for example, LS encourages to write a long time ago instead of 1871. However, the language as such is not altered. LS is supposed to serve accessibility.

A similar concept is Einfache Sprache, which is less regulated and closer to standard German. Its target group are people with cognitive challenges and people with a different first language than German.

Several intellectuals and journalists have criticised texts in LS, for example after it was used additionally by the Bremen authorities for the regional elections of 2015. According to them, LS does not take readers seriously and simplifies the content too much. In 2017, journalist Alfred Dorfer mocked LS on Austrian teletext and apologized later after having spoken to people who benefit from LS texts.

Some of the rules of LS:

- Write short sentences.
- Use one sentence per line.
- Use one sentence for one statement.
- Use active voice.
- Do not use conditional mood.
- A sentence should be formed with the elements subject + predicate + object.
- Do not use synonyms.
- Split compound words: Write Bundes-Tag, not Bundestag.
- LS is not directed to children and should address the readers as adults, using the normal (formal) pronouns.

== German law ==
In Germany, a law (§ 11, Behindertengleichstellungsgesetz) requires the authorities to provide information more and more in LS. The federal government enforces the use of LS by the authorities and their competences to write texts in LS.

== See also ==
- Easy read
- Special English
