= Frespañol =

Mixture of the French and Spanish languages

Frespañol or frespagnol (also known as frañol or fragnol) is a portmanteau of the words French-Creole (Hatian creole, Martinque creole, Guadeloupe creole) (or francés in Spanish) and español, which mean French and Spanish mixed together, usually in informal settings. This example of code-switching is a mixture between French and Spanish, almost always in speech, but may be used in writing occasionally. Spanish and French are Romance languages and share similarities in morphology and syntax.

Such code-switching may be used or has been used in places where both languages meet, for example in Equatorial Guinea, among Haitians in the Dominican Republic and Costa Rica, by first-generation Spaniards in France, or Latin American community in Montreal, Canada. This code-switching has historical and current presence in North, Central and South America.

Historically, the Isleños in Louisiana were also exposed to and accustomed to living with both languages, as were numerous French emigrant communities across Latin America (e.g. French Argentines and French Costa Ricans), whose descendants have overwhelmingly adopted Spanish.

During World War II many French immigrant communities flourished in the Americas, maintaining frañol a historically and currently observable example of code-switching in English, Spanish, and French-speaking countries.

== Uses and calques ==
Frespañol forms part of a structure of sociolinguistics, it is a social and cultural code born from the contact of French and Spanish speakers. In its early days, the Frespañol was used in individual form meaning there was no set form to follow, everyone used their own variant of it. Now, it is more commonly used amongst the first generation of immigrants who use it more so when speaking Spanish. Calques are introduced by bilinguals, switching from one language to another, words are borrowed. For example, in this phrase in French "Je m'assome à la fenêtre” the Spanish word "asomarse" adapts to the sentence. These code changes are adapted to the context of the speaker. Some ways that the two languages are implemented together is sometimes minute. Looking through the chart, The word for cake in Fragnol, gató, is predominately French based such as other words listed. But, the thing that makes it more in tune with Spanish is the uses of the accents and the stress when pronouncing the word. Some other words, such as dèpanor, are also more alike to the French word for store, but the ending or pronunciation of the words can go through a morphological change and have more Spanish tones and pronunciations, or vice versa.

Frespañol calques
English word	French word	Spanish word	Fragnol
Insurance	Assurance	Seguro	Asségourance
Unemployment	Chômage	Paro	Tchomás
Slippers	Pantoufle	Pantuflas	Pantúnflas
Mrs.	Madame	Señora	Madán
Peas	Petits pois	Guisantes	Petipuás
Backpack	Sac-à-dos	Mochila	Sacodó
Cake	Gâteau	Pastel	Gató
Galician Pie	Tarte galicienne	Empanada	Èmpanade
To speak	Parler	Hablar	Habler
School	École	Escuela	Escuele
Store	Dépanneur	Tienda	Dèpanor
Convenient store	Épicerie	Mercado	Epicería
Apple	Pomme	Manzana	Pomma

== Identity ==
The use of Frespañol is often reflective of a minority group with two cultural identities regarding language. Similar to Spanglish, the hybrid language of Frespañol incorporates French and Spanish as a subset of both languages, which then has created a separate individuality and selfhood of heritages and cultural backgrounds. This often helps individuals of Frespañol with their identification of either group, or both at the same time while creating a separate identify of their own. As with Spanglish, this association allows for speakers to code-switch and also implement heritage, with the ability to shift when it is needed most and depending on environment. Apart from code-switching and creating a subset of the languages used, it allows for a separate identify in both heritage and cultural. This dual identity is reflected in social media and other platforms.

As the hybrid language of Frespañol grows and gains a prominent recognition, access to it has been made available in audio and online formats.

This identification and association to Frespanol (Fragnol) allows for identification of mistakes from non Frespanol speakers and visibility to inclusion or exclusion to be able to identify as a Fragnol speaker. Common example mistakes include taking the wrong word due to its similarity in one language and the assumption it translates the same with the other. For example: Me exprimire to mean, "I express myself", as the French translation is m'exprimer. However, in standard Spanish, exprimire is translated to: squeezing. It is understood that Frespanol speakers would not make this mistake and be aware of the appropriate phrase to use.

== History ==
Frespañol/Frespagnol is a portmanteau of French (francés/français) and Spanish (español/espagnol). Frañol/Fragnol is similarly derived from the two. This dialect is the effect of a blend of two cultures. It began during the 20th century hundreds of thousands of Spaniards migrated to France in search of better living conditions. It first began with men migrating to France and then later on they would migrate their families into the country. The people from Spain that migrated to France did not all pick up the French language. Post-World War I France needed to be rebuilt, which opened the door to job opportunities for the Spanish in France. The Spanish had their own communities in cities such as Paris, Toulouse, Bordeaux and Lyon, where they spoke their mother tongue. The rise and development of Frespañol was in 1960s–1970s. The Spanish workers knew very little French and the French employers knew very little Spanish, regardless they had to communicate with each other, that's when Frespañol surged naturally and it was commonly found used with people working everyday jobs such as maids, construction workers and in the automotive sector. The people that spoke it were typically from lower class communities.

== Boundaries and cultural impacts ==
The main geographic boundary where Frespañol first presented itself was along the border of Spain and France. As mentioned previously in the page, the initial flow of Spanish immigrants to France from the beginning of the 20th century up until the 1960s–1970s occurred for economic reasons and was the origin for this hybrid language. These migrations were the primary source for Frespañol, originating with the Spanish incorporating their language of origin with that of their new home country. The migrations caused an incline in the merge between the languages, resulting in the creation of this new culture for people who lived through and could share their similar language experiences. As the Spanish working class migrated deeper into France, Frespañol begun to appear in more populated cities, like Paris.

== Notable people ==
Manu Chao

== See also ==
- Globish
- Macaronic
- Spanglish
