= Natural language programming =

Language-oriented programming paradigm

Natural language programming is an ontology-assisted way of programming in terms of natural language sentences, e.g. English. A structured document with content, sections and subsections for explanations of sentences forms a natural language computer program. Some methods for program synthesis are based on natural-language programming.

One application is to use natural language programming to represent the knowledge of an autonomous robot; the robots tasks can then be scripted by its users so that the robot can execute them autonomously while keeping to prescribed rules of behaviour as determined by the robot's user. Such robots are called transparent robots as their reasoning is transparent to users.

Examples of natural language programming languages include: Inform 7, a natural programming language for making interactive fiction; Shakespeare, an esoteric natural programming language in the style of the plays of William Shakespeare; and Wolfram Alpha, a computational knowledge engine, using natural-language input.

== Interpretation ==
The smallest statement in a natural language program is a sentence. Each sentence is stated in terms of concepts from the underlying ontology, attributes in that ontology, and named objects in capital letters. In a natural language program, every sentence unambiguously compiles into a procedure call in the underlying high-level programming language such as MATLAB, Octave, SciLab, Python, etc.

Symbolic languages such as Wolfram Language are capable of interpreted processing of queries by sentences. This can allow interactive requests such as that implemented in Wolfram Alpha. However, this is not natural language programming.

An example text from an English language natural language program is as follows:

If U_ is 'smc01-control', then do the following. Define surface weights Alpha as "[0.5, 0.5]". Initialise matrix Phi as a 'unit matrix'. Define J as the 'inertia matrix' of Spc01. Compute matrix J2 as the inverse of J. Compute position velocity error Ve and angular velocity error Oe from dynamical state X, guidance reference Xnow. Define the joint sliding surface G2 from the position velocity error Ve and angular velocity error Oe using the surface weights Alpha. Compute the smoothed sign function SG2 from the joint sliding surface G2 with sign threshold 0.01. Compute special dynamical force F from dynamical state X and surface weights Alpha. Compute control torque T and control force U from matrix J2, surface weights Alpha, special dynamical force F, smoothed sign function SG2. Finish conditional actions.

that defines a feedback control scheme using a sliding mode control method.

== Software paradigm ==
Natural-language programming is a top-down method of writing software. Its stages are as follows:

- Definition of an ontology – taxonomy – of concepts needed to describe tasks in the topic addressed. Each concept and all their attributes are defined in natural-language words. This ontology will define the data structures the natural language program can use in sentences.
- Definition of one or more top-level sentences in terms of concepts from the ontology. These sentences are later used to invoke the most important activities in the topic.
- Defining of each of the top-level sentences in terms of a sequence of sentences.
- Defining each of the lower-level sentences in terms of other sentences or by a simple sentence of the form Execute code "...". where ... stands for a code in terms of the associated high-level programming language.
- Repeating the previous step until you have no sentences left undefined. During this process each of sentences can be classified to belong to a section of the document to be produced in HTML or Latex format to form the final natural-language program.
- Testing the meaning of each sentence by executing its code using testing objects.
- Providing a library of procedure calls (in the underlying high-level language) which are needed in the code definitions of some low-level-sentence meanings.
- Providing a title, author data and compiling the sentences into an HTML or LaTeX file.
- Publishing the natural-language program as a webpage on the Internet or as a PDF file compiled from the LaTeX document.

== Publication value of natural-language programs and documents ==
A natural-language program is a precise formal description of some procedure that its author created. It is human readable and it can also be read by a suitable software agent. For example, a web page in a natural language format can be read by a software personal assistant agent to a person and she or he can ask the agent to execute some sentences, i.e. carry out some task or answer a question. There is a reader agent available for English interpretation of HTML-based natural language programming documents that a person can run on their personal computer.

== Contribution of natural-language programs to machine knowledge ==
An ontology class is a natural-language program that is not a concept in the sense as humans use concepts. Concepts in a naturalmlanguage program are examples (samples) of generic human concepts. Each sentence in a natural-language program is either (1) stating a relationship in a world model or (2) carries out an action in the environment or (3) carries out a computational procedure or (4) invokes an answering mechanism in response to a question.

A set of natural language programming sentences, with associated ontology defined, can also be used as a pseudo code that does not provide the details in any underlying high level programming language. In such an application the sentences used become high level abstractions (conceptualisations) of computing procedures that are computer language and machine independent.

== AI in natural language programming ==
Researchers have started to experiment with natural language programming environments that use plain language prompts and then use large language models to turn natural language into formal code. For example Spatial Pixel created a natural language programming environment to turn natural language into P5.js code through OpenAI's API. In 2021 OpenAI developed a natural language programming environment for their programming large language model called Codex.

=== Vibe coding ===
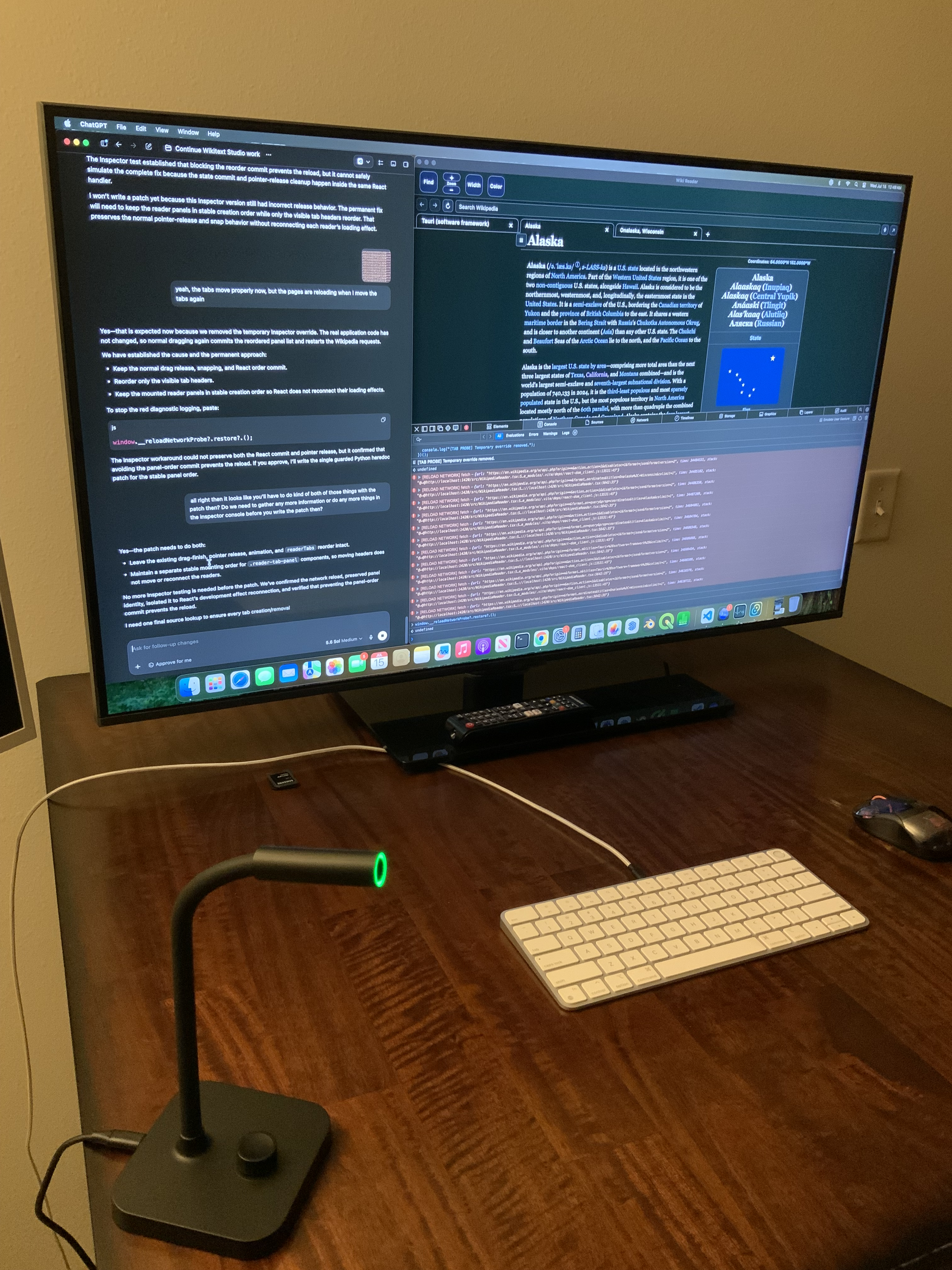
Microphone to vibe code with Codex via voice to text

Vibe coding is the software development practice assisted by artificial intelligence (AI) where the software developer describes a project or task in natural languages to a large language model (LLM), which generates source code automatically. Vibe coding may involve accepting AI-generated code without thorough review of the output, instead relying on results and follow-up prompts to guide changes.

The term was coined in February 2025 by computer scientist Andrej Karpathy, a co-founder of OpenAI and former AI leader at Tesla. In March 2025, Merriam-Webster listed the term as a "slang & trending" expression. It was also named the Collins English Dictionary Word of the Year for 2025.

Advocates of vibe coding say it allows amateur programmers to produce software without the extensive training and skills required for software engineering. Critics say there is a lack of accountability, maintainability, and an increased risk of introducing security vulnerabilities in the resulting software.

== See also ==
- Controlled natural language
- Context-free language
- Domain-specific language (or DSL)
- End-user programming
- Knowledge representation
- Natural-language processing
- Source-code generation
- Very high-level programming language
- Vibe coding, a method of performing natural language programming using a large language model

=== Programming languages with English-like syntax ===
- AppleScript
- Attempto Controlled English
- COBOL
- ClearTalk
- FLOW-MATIC
- HyperTalk
- Inform 7
- JOSS
- SenseTalk
- Software AG
- Transcript
- Structured Query Language (or SQL)
- xTalk

=== Programming languages with other natural language-like vocabulary or syntax ===
- Non-English-based programming languages

== Bibliography ==
Books

- Natural Language Programming of Agents and Robotic Devices: publishing for agents and humans in sEnglish by S M Veres, ISBN 978-0-9558417-0-5, London, June 2008.
- Dijkstra, Edsger W. (1979). "On the foolishness of "natural language programming"". Program Construction. Lecture Notes in Computer Science. Vol. 69. pp. 51–53. doi:10.1007/bfb0014656. ISBN 3-540-09251-X.
- Lieberman, Henry; Liu, Hugo (2006). "Feasibility Studies for Programming in Natural Language". End User Development. Human-Computer Interaction Series. Vol. 9. pp. 459–473. doi:10.1007/1-4020-5386-x_20. ISBN 978-1-4020-4220-1.
- Halpern, Mark (1990). "Natural Language and Redundancy in Programming". Binding Time: Six Studies in Programming Technology & Milieu. Ablex series in computational science. Intellect Books. ISBN 9780893916916.

Papers at conferences

- Veres, S.M.; Molnar, L. (2010). "Documents for Intelligent Agents in English". Artificial Intelligence and Applications. doi:10.2316/p.2010.674-122. ISBN 978-0-88986-817-5.
- Sliding mode control of autonomous spacecraft. (half written in sEnglish) by S M Veres an N K Lincoln, Proc. TAROS’2008, Towards Autonomous Robotic Systems, Edinburgh, 1–3 September 2008.
- Veres, Sandor M. (2010). "Mission Capable Autonomous Control Systems in the Oceans, in the Air and in Space". Brain-Inspired Information Technology. Studies in Computational Intelligence. Vol. 266. pp. 1–10. doi:10.1007/978-3-642-04025-2_1. ISBN 978-3-642-04024-5.
- Pulido-Prieto, Oscar; Juárez-Martínez, Ulises (2017). "A Survey of Naturalistic Programming Technologies". ACM Computing Surveys. 50 (5): 1–35. doi:10.1145/3109481. S2CID 2078759.

Program synthesis from natural language specifications

- Raza, Mohammad, Sumit Gulwani, and Natasa Milic-Frayling. "Compositional Program Synthesis from Natural Language and Examples." IJCAI. 2015.
- Green, Cordell. "A Summary of the PSI Program Synthesis System." IJCAI. Vol. 5. 1977.
