= Simple language =

Simple language may refer to:

- Plain language, writing for easier understanding and quick readability
- Easy read, adapting access to written information
- Simple speech, vernacular forms of Ukrainian and Belarusian languages
  - Prostaya mova, variety of Belarusian language spoken in Lithuania and Poland
- Toki Pona § Etymology, meaning good or simple talk

== See also ==
- Simple English (disambiguation)
