= Simplified Technical English =

Controlled language for technical documentation

ASD-STE100 Simplified Technical English (STE) is a controlled natural language that is designed to simplify and clarify technical documentation. It was originally developed in the 1980s by the European Association of Aerospace Industries (AECMA) at the request of the European airline industry, which wanted a standardized form of English for aircraft maintenance documentation that could be easily understood by non-native English-speakers.

It has since been adopted in many other fields outside the aerospace, defense, and maintenance domains for its clear, consistent, and comprehensive nature. The current edition of the STE standard, which was published in January 2025, consists of 53 writing rules and a dictionary of approximately 900 approved words.

== History ==
The first attempts towards controlled English were made as early as the 1930s and the 1970s with Basic English, Caterpillar Fundamental English, and Eastman Kodak (KISL). In 1979, aerospace documentation was written in American English (Boeing, Douglas, Lockheed, etc.), in British English (Hawker Siddeley, British Aircraft Corporation, etc.) and by companies whose native language was not English (Fokker, Aeritalia, Aérospatiale, and some of the companies that formed Airbus at the time).

Because European airlines needed to translate parts of their maintenance documentation into other languages for local mechanics, the European Airline industry approached the European Association of Aerospace Industries (AECMA) to investigate the possibility of using a controlled or standardized form of English, with a strong focus on readability and comprehensibility. In 1983, after an investigation into the different types of controlled languages that existed in other industries, AECMA decided to produce its own controlled English. The AIA (Aerospace Industries Association of America) was also invited to participate in this project. The result of this collaborative work was the release of the AECMA document PSC-85-16598 (known as the AECMA Simplified English Guide) in 1985. Subsequently, several changes, issues and revisions were released up to the present issue (Issue 9).

After the merger of AECMA with two other associations to form the Aerospace, Security and Defence Industries Association of Europe (ASD) in 2004, the document was renamed ASD Simplified Technical English, Specification ASD-STE100. Thus, STE evolved from guide to specification. With Issue 9, it has transitioned to international standard. The change in designation (the subtitle of the document is "Standard for Technical Documentation") is not just a reclassification but a significant step toward reinforcing the global applicability of STE.

ASD-STE100 is maintained by the Simplified Technical English Maintenance Group (STEMG), a working group of ASD, formed in 1983. The copyright of ASD-STE100 is fully owned by ASD.

The ever-evolving nature of technology and technical language causes the STEMG to rely on user feedback for suggested changes and updates. Since Issue 6 in 2013, ASD-STE100 has become free of charge. Over the years, 18,981 official copies of Issues 6, 7, and 8 were distributed. Since Issue 9 was released in January 2025, almost 1,000 official copies have been distributed (distribution log updated March 2025). Usually, a new issue is released every three years.

== Structure of the standard ==
The ASD-STE100 Simplified Technical English Standard consists of two parts:

1. The writing rules
2. The dictionary

=== Writing rules ===
The writing rules cover aspects of grammar and style. The rules also differentiate between two types of texts: procedures and descriptions. A non-exhaustive list of the writing rules includes the concepts that follow:

- Use the approved words only as the part of speech and meaning given in the dictionary.
- Make instructions as clear and specific as possible.
- Do not write multi-word nouns that have more than three words.
- Use the approved forms of the verb to make only:
  - The infinitive form
  - The imperative form
  - The simple present tense
  - The simple past tense
  - The simple future tense
  - The past participle (only as an adjective)
- Do not use auxiliary verbs to make complex verb constructions.
- Use the "-ing" form of a verb only as a technical noun or as a modifier in a technical noun.
- Use the active voice. In descriptive writing, one should use the passive voice only when the agent is unknown.
- Write short sentences: no more than 20 words in instructions (procedures) and 25 words in descriptive texts.
- Do not omit parts of the sentence (e.g. verb, subject, article) to make the text shorter.
- Use vertical lists for complex text.
- Write one instruction per sentence.
- Write only one topic per paragraph.
- Do not write more than six sentences in each paragraph.
- Start safety instructions with a clear command or condition.

=== Dictionary ===
The table that follows is an extract from a page of the ASD-STE100 dictionary:

Word (part of speech)	Approved meaning / alternatives	STE example	Non-STE example
acceptance (n)	ACCEPT (v)	BEFORE YOU ACCEPT THE UNIT, DO THE SPECIFIED TEST PROCEDURE.	Before acceptance of unit, do the specified test procedure.
ACCESS (n)	The ability to go into or near	GET ACCESS TO THE ACCUMULATOR FOR THE No. 1 HYDRAULIC SYSTEM.	
accessible (adj)	ACCESS (n)	TURN THE COVER UNTIL YOU CAN GET ACCESS TO THE JACKS THAT HAVE + AND − MARKS.	Rotate the cover until the jacks marked + and − are accessible.
ACCIDENT (n)	An occurrence that causes injury or damage	TO PREVENT ACCIDENTS, MAKE SURE THAT THE PINS ARE INSTALLED.	

Explanation of the four columns:

Word (part of speech) – This column has information on the word and its part of speech. Every approved word in STE is permitted only as a specific part of speech. For example, the word "test" is approved only as a noun (the test), not as a verb (to test). There are few exceptions to the "One word, one part of speech, one meaning" principle.

Approved meaning/alternatives – This column gives the approved meaning (or definition) of an approved word in STE. In the example table, "ACCESS" and "ACCIDENT" are approved (they are written in uppercase). The text in these definitions is not written in STE. If a meaning is not given in the dictionary, one cannot use the word in that meaning. Instead, an alternative word has to be used. For words that are not approved (they are written in lowercase, such as "acceptance" and "accessible" in the example table), this column gives approved alternatives that one can use to replace the words that are not approved. These alternatives are in uppercase, and they are only suggestions. It is possible that the suggested alternative for an unapproved word has a different part of speech. Usually, the first suggested alternative has the same part of speech as the word that is not approved.

STE example – This column shows how to use the approved word or how to use the approved alternative (usually a word-for-word replacement). It also shows how to keep the same meaning with a different construction. The wording given in the STE examples is not mandatory. It shows only one method to write a text with approved words. One can frequently use different constructions with other approved words and keep the same meaning.

Non-STE example – This column (text in lowercase) gives examples that show how the word that is not approved is frequently used in standard technical writing. The examples also help one to understand the use the approved alternatives or different constructions to give the same information. For approved words, this column is empty unless there is a help symbol (lightbulb) related to other meanings or restrictions.

The dictionary includes entries for words that are approved and for words that are not approved. The approved words can be used only according to their specified meaning. For example, the word "close" (v) can be used in only one of two meanings:

1. To move together, or to move to a position that stops or prevents materials from going in or out
2. To operate a circuit breaker to make an electrical circuit

The verb can express to close a door or to close a circuit, but it cannot be used with other connotations (e.g., to close a meeting or to close a business). The adjective "close" appears in the dictionary as a word that is not approved with the suggested approved alternative "NEAR" (prep). Thus, STE does not allow do not go close to the landing gear, but it does allow do not go near the landing gear. In addition to the general STE vocabulary listed in the dictionary, Section 1, Words, gives specific guidelines for using technical nouns and technical verbs that writers need to describe technical information. For example, nouns, multi-word nouns, or verbs such as grease, discoloration, propeller, aural warning system, overhead panel, to ream, and to drill are not listed in the dictionary, but they qualify as approved terms according to Part 1, Section 1 (specifically, writing rules 1.5 and 1.12).

== Aerospace and defense standards ==
"Simplified Technical English" is sometimes used as a generic term for a controlled natural language. The standard started as an industry-regulated writing standard for aircraft maintenance documentation, but it has become a requirement for an increasing number of military land vehicles, seacraft, and weapons programs. Although it was not initially intended for use as a general writing standard, it has been successfully adopted by other industries and for a wide range of document types. The US government's plain English lacks the strict vocabulary restrictions of the aerospace standard, but represents an attempt at a more general writing standard.

Since 1986, STE has been a requirement of the ATA Specification i2200 (formerly ATA100) and ATA104 (Training). STE is also a requirement of the S1000D specification. The European Defence Standards Reference (EDSTAR) recommends STE as one of the best practice standards for writing technical documentation to be applied for defense contracting by all EDA (European Defence Agency) participating member states.

Today, the success of STE is such that other industries use it beyond its initial purpose for maintenance documentation and outside the aerospace and defense domains. At the end of Issue 8 distribution in December 2024, the Issue 8 STE distribution log shows that 64% of users come from outside these two industries. STE is successfully applied in the automotive, renewable energies, and offshore logistics sectors, and is further expanding within medical devices and the pharmaceutical sector. STE interest is also increasing within the academic world, including the disciplines of information engineering, applied linguistics, and computational linguistics).

== Tools ==
Several unrelated software products exist to support the application of STE, but the STEMG and ASD do not endorse or certify these products.

Boeing developed the Boeing Simplified English Checker (BSEC). This linguistic-based checker uses a sophisticated 350-rule English parser, which is augmented with special functions that check for violations of the Simplified Technical English specification.

HyperSTE is a plugin tool offered by Etteplan to check content for adherence to the rules and grammar of the standard.

Congree offers a Simplified Technical English Checker based on linguistic algorithms. It supports all rules of Simplified Technical English issue 7 that are relevant to the text composition and provides an integrated Simplified Technical English dictionary.

The TechScribe term checker for ASD-STE100 helps writers to find text that does not conform to ASD-STE100.

In addition to specialised tools, many modern AI tools (such as LLMs) are able to check and write in ASD-STE100 style when requested by the user.

== Misapplication issues and limited adoption ==
Most organizations, outside of aerospace and the military, do not use Simplified Technical English (STE) in their technical documentation, in large part because it no longer serves its original purpose. Modern corporations and academic organizations hire technical writers already trained to follow a simplified form of English that the layman reader can easily understand, known as plain language (PL).

Popular style guides, like the Chicago Manual of Style and the Associated Press Stylebook, are an important part of modern technical writing. These style guides set writing standards for an eighth-grade reading level or simply require writers to emphasize clarity, brevity, and consistency. When properly applied, the use of PL and a style guide eliminates the need for an overlapping control to simplify documentation further. In addition, STE is often misapplied within aerospace and military organizations, typically as a substitute for a grammar-based style guide. The result has led untrained writers, working within these industries, to standardize the grammatically incorrect application of STE-approved words to ensure consistency. The poor documentation STE often produces is well known in corporate and academic circles, whose hiring practices suggest they rely almost exclusively on college-educated technical writers instead of pure language controls. Studies have found that it is difficult for writers to apply STE correctly.

"Writing correctly in STE is not an easy task as it requires a good command of the English language together with a good knowledge of the matter of the writing. This combination is without a doubt the key to writing successfully in STE. Authors who would like to write proficiently and correctly in STE must have as the only point of reference the STE specification itself. There is nothing that can replace it. A partial use of the specification or deviations from its writing rules and vocabulary will diminish the accuracy of STE and create confusion among its users."

"To assist users and potential users of STE, there are software products on the market that support STE. These products may be helpful, but the basic question is: 'Do we really need a software product to write in STE correctly?' Well, the answer is no simply because software does not think in place of authors and does not replace the STE specification. It is necessary to stress that none of these checkers write STE text for authors, nor can they convert non-STE text into STE. Thus, these products should only be seen as aids for those authors having a good knowledge of STE. Although STE checkers can be helpful in highlighting non-STE terms and incorrectly written STE text, they are not 'fool-proof'. There are cases in which STE checkers parse STE texts correctly (no errors flagged) even if these texts do not obey the standard English grammar! Authoring tools must be used with discernment and if authors rely blindly on what checkers tell them, they are likely to write rubbish. The authors are the ones who know, think and control. Only the authors are the ones who must decide whether what a tool has told them is correct or not."

— Jezdimir Knezevic, MIRCE Akademy, https://www.researchgate.net/publication/281930328_Improving_quality_of_maintenance_through_Simplified_Technical_English

The original developers of STE never intended for writers to use STE as a replacement for a true style guide. They expected only for writers to follow STE for occasional assistance in limiting content to the use of approved words in grammatically-correct sentences. Instead, many of today's aerospace and military technical writers rely exclusively on STE to write procedures. The Aerospace, Security and Defence Industries Association of Europe (ASD) includes the following disclaimer within the STE's front matter: "Can STE be used alone? No. It is intended to be used with other applicable specifications for technical publications, style guides, and official directives. A high standard of professionalism is necessary to use the STE specification correctly." Additionally, today's electronic translation tools are rapidly progressing, which helps to eliminate the need for STE control over localized documentation.

== See also ==
- Attempto Controlled English
- Basic English
- Constructed language
- International English
- Plain language
- Special English
- Style guide
- Topic-based authoring
