= Specialized English =

English language simplified for radio listeners

Specialized English is a controlled version of the English language used for radio broadcasting, easier for non-native speakers of English. It is derived from Voice of America (VoA) Special English.

Specialized English was developed initially by Feba Radio in the UK, but Feba ceased direct involvement in 2009. Specialized English programs are now produced by staff in the US and in the UK. Its main use is in the features service program 'Spotlight', which is produced jointly and widely broadcast on over sixty outlets globally. Scripts and audio are also available freely on the Spotlight website.

== Design and usage ==
Specialized English sounds the same as Special English, and it almost is the same. Both use a 1500 word core vocabulary, short sentences, and slow delivery (about 90 wpm). Special English was developed from about 1959 by Voice of America. Specialized was developed from Special in the late 1990s, independently of Voice of America. The methodological ethos is identical, but there is a slight difference in the vocabulary, and Specialized is more international. VoA is a federal US government department so is restricted from making Special English programs for anything other than VoA's own use. Specialized English operates in the civil society sector, and the developers aspire to make programs for a variety of public service purposes, subject to resources being available. The developers of Specialized felt they should choose a name that acknowledged both the similarity and the difference.

The reason that Specialized was developed from Special English has to do with their respective intended usage. They are not primarily teaching tools (even though they are popular with listeners as an aid to learning) but communication tools. The choice of words in the 1500 word list depends to a degree on what is to be communicated. Most of the words are the most frequently learned, most commonly used English words. Both tools use these words. But many words are chosen for the intended purpose. For example, Special English uses words a US government news broadcaster might need, such as Congress, federal, administration, capitalism and recession. Specialized replaces some of these words with words used for religious subjects, such as blessing, prayer, miracle, and faith. Further revisions of the Specialized English list were made in 2000 and 2007, in the light of experience. Still, the overlap of the two vocabularies is 91.3%. The Specialized English word list allows greater breadth of meaning in some of the words used in both lists. For example, the word joint:

Special

joint - ad. shared by two or more

Specialized

joint - ad. shared by two or more. N. the place where two parts or things are :fixed together.

Specialized also allows more prefixes and suffixes, which has allowed some words to be removed from the core list. (e.g. wonderful not needed in the list because it can be built from wonder+ful)

As well as the 1500 word core vocabulary, both Special and Specialized English also generally allow: inflections of the core words, numbers up to a million, pronouns, proper nouns, and any words whose meaning can be communicated in real time (in a radio broadcast) using the core vocabulary.

The following table lists some differences between the two methods:

Property	Special English (VoA)	Specialized English (Spotlight)
Date developed	1959, with later revisions	Cloned from VoA in 1998, with modifications
Core vocabulary	1493 words	1508 words
Extra words (appendices)	117 words	89 words
Principal uses	Radio news and features, especially US	Radio features, international
Broadcast context	Government outlets, usually alongside other English broadcasts	Private outlets, usually within non-English language religious services
Use of English	American English	American and British English
Voices	American	International, but mostly American and British
Use of music and sound effects	Infrequent	Frequent
Production centers	1 US	2 US, 1 UK
Words in one core list, but not the other. (The way that each system works means that the presence or absence of a word in the core list is not the sole criterion as to whether it is used in the programs.)	In 'Special' list only: administration, agency, aggression, agriculture, air force, album, amend, anarchy, arms, artillery, astronaut, astronomy, asylum, automobile, ballot, boycott, budget, cabinet, campaign, capitalism, careful, case (1 of 2), ceasefire, chairman, children, civil rights, civilian, clergy, coalition, colony, committee, congress, conservative, container, convention, co-operate, curfew, customs (port), deaf, deficit, delegate, denounce, deploy, dictator, diplomat, disarm, dissident, extremist, federal, fireworks, government, grind, guarantee, halt, headquarters, hijack, inflation, jail, lamb, legislature, liberal, manufacture, mayor, media, militant, missile, mob, movie, nominate, offensive, our, oust, parachute, postpone, profession, professor, propaganda, publication, radar, railroad, realistic, recession, relations, repress, sabotage, senate, sickness, stab, submarine, substitute, subversion, succeed, supervise, swear in, telescope, them, transportation, treason, troops, truce, us, veto, wonderful	In Specialized list only: achieve, address, advantage, alliance, amaze, arrow, attitude, authority, bag, basic, behave, behavior, bend, birth, bless, blessing, bow, bow, branch, breath, camel, cassette, cent, chapter, character, class, coat, coin, column, concentrate, conscience, corner, courage, cousin, crown, curtain, death, decay, deserve, devote, dictate, divorce, donkey, else, envy, excite, faith, favorite, fever, gate, generation, global, greed, image, Internet, joy, king, layer, leaf, lock, lord, lot, manage, master, medical, messenger, miracle, national, negative, notice, orange, origin, particular, persuade, pleasant, positive, poverty, prayer, print, product, promise, proud, railway, refrigerator, relate, rent, replace, respect, rid, royal, shame, shirt, smile, snake, solution, song, student, success, sword, symbol, table, tempt, tent, those, toilet, translate, triangle, trousers, truth, verse, virgin, wine, wing, witness.
