= Globish =

Globish may refer to:

- Globish (Gogate), an artificial language created by Madhukar Gogate related to, but independent of, standard English
- Globish (Nerrière), a subset of standard English words compiled by Jean-Paul Nerrière
- Global English, the concept of the English language as a global means of communication
