= Feba Radio =

Christian broadcasting network

Feba Radio is a British-founded broadcasting network. It is driven by Christian values rather than by government or commercial aims.

It was established in 1959 in the UK as the Far Eastern Broadcasting Associates (FEBA, later known as Feba Radio) – associated with Far East Broadcasting Company (FEBC) operating in United States and Philippines and the Far East Broadcasting Associates of India (FEBAI).

== History ==
Initially, Feba Radio (UK) was an idea initiated by Douglas Malton and John Wheatley who, together with other individuals in UK, were interested in supporting what FEBC-USA was doing. FEBC-USA had difficulty reaching audiences in North India and identified Seychelles as a promising location to build an international shortwave transmitting station for this purpose.

=== Seychelles ===
Seychelles was a British crown colony, and in 1968 Feba Radio (UK) was incorporated as a charity and a company with the primary aim of planning, building and operating a radio station there. It was unique in having the antennas built over a lagoon 1 km (1,000 yards) offshore. The station was in many ways modelled on FEBC-USA's station in Manila, providing for multi-lingual programme production close to the station. Most of Feba's activity was in Seychelles, as a foreign company, with a small support operation in UK.

In 1970, Feba Radio (UK) began regular shortwave broadcasts from their station in Seychelles using temporary equipment. The next four years saw the development of studios, offices, housing, transmitters, and the offshore "reef" antenna system. The oil crisis during this period seriously increased electricity cost and heightened the need for good strategic planning. Thereafter milestones in developing the Feba Radio network were often linked to international conferences held roughly every two years.

=== Move to offshore antennas ===
In June 1976, there was an international conference in Seychelles at a time when the nation of Seychelles gained independence and the offshore antennas were approved for use after a two-year delay, so the temporary antennas were dismantled and transmitted power levels were increased to 100 kW. Feba Seychelles' schedule was expanding to cover Southwest Asia, the Middle East and Africa. An English news service was introduced with the intention of expanding that into other languages. The English used on Feba programmes is predicated on the idea that most of the audience are not native speakers, and it uses a vocabulary and pacing ("Feba English") similar to that used in Simple English.

In April 1979, an international conference was held in the newly leased UK office in Addlestone. For various reasons several key staff were repatriated to UK and began to operate a "headquarters" office there.

In November 1981, an international conference in Mussoree, India, resolved that Feba should increase its role in programme production, rather than simply broadcasting other organisations' programmes. This was to be done by staff in the listening areas, not by moving them to Seychelles, and provision was made for up to 50% of each programme service to be "in-house" production.

In May 1984, there was another international conference in Seychelles. Feba was challenged to expand into a second large shortwave station in Sierra Leone but instead decided to focus on improving programming. There followed a decade of vigorous activity.

=== "World by 2000" ===
In June 1986, there was an international conference in Flevohof, Netherlands, during the International Christian Media Convention (ICMC). With other major Christian broadcasters, Feba entered into the ambitious "World by 2000" commitment to enable everyone to hear about Christianity on the radio in a language that they could understand.

In September 1988 there was an international conference in Singapore, and in September, 1991, another international conference in Sheffield, UK, jointly with the FEBC-USA partners.

In October 1994 in another international conference in Hove, UK, there was an attempt to move away from the idea of Feba UK being "headquarters" and to try to make each national operation as autonomous as possible despite the practicalities of centralising the schedule of broadcasting through the limited facilities (essentially the antenna coverage) of the one station in Seychelles and optimising its use cost-effectively. In January 1996 there was an international conference in Tagaytay, Philippines.

=== The end of the Cold War ===
In 1996 the Government of Seychelles gave Feba early warning that their East Coast land reclamation activity was likely to bring development which was incompatible with continuing operation of Feba's station within five years. As it happened the recent end of propaganda broadcasting associated with the Cold War and apartheid meant that surplus shortwave transmission capability was beginning to be marketed attractively in Feba's area. This stimulated Feba to consider two things: more of an emphasis on "people with something to say" rather than on the nuts and bolts of operating a radio station; and creation of an international Feba structure instead of one depending on Seychelles as a hub.

In May 1998, another international conference was held in Worthing, UK. Around 1999 the tightening regulation of charities in the UK caused Feba to seriously change direction regarding international structure. This was essentially so that Feba Radio (UK) could demonstrate good accountability for the use of funds raised in the UK which were handed to Feba staff in other countries to spend. This second attempt at an international structure became very unwieldy. In February 2000, another international conference, held jointly with FEBC-USA was held in Larnaca, Cyprus. In February 2002, another conference was held in Johannesburg, South Africa.

=== Closure of Seychelles station ===
In 2003 the large station in Seychelles was closed, although Feba Radio continues to use radio in many ways in the region. In January 2004, another joint conference with FEBC-USA was held in Bali, Indonesia. In January 2006, the international conference was held in Pretoria, South Africa.

In January, 2008, another international conference was held in High Leigh, UK, joint with FEBC-USA's partners. Feba-UK began working with a third, compromise, international structure based on agreements with each partner which are tailored to the requirements of each partnership rather than one-size-fits-all.

== See also ==
- Specialized English, a controlled natural language of English, developed by Feba
