= Controlled language in machine translation =

Using controlled language in machine translation poses several problems.

In an automated translation, the first step in order to understand the controlled language is to know what it is and to distinguish between natural language and controlled language.

The main problem in machine translation is a linguistic problem. Language is ambiguous and the system tries to model a language on lexical and grammatical way. In order to solve this problem there are a lot of alternatives, e.g. a glossary related with the text's topic can be used.

== Benefits of using a controlled language ==
It is enabling to produce texts easier to read, more comprehensible and easier to retain, as well as with better vocabulary and style. Reasons for introducing a controlled language include:

- Documents that are more readable and comprehensible improve the usability of a product.
- Controlled-language guarantees giving objective and structured support in a typically rather subjective and unstructured environment.
- Tools-driven controlled language environments enable the automation of many editing tasks and provide objective quality metrics for the authoring process.
- More restrictive and controlled language, more uniform and standardized resulting source document and higher the match rate in a translation memory system, and the translation cost is cheaper.
- A controlled language designed for machine translation will significantly improve the quality of machine-generated translation proposals and it will reduce the time and cost of human translators editing.

== Controlled language and translation ==
One of the biggest challenges facing organizations that wish to reduce the cost and time involved in their translations is the fact that even in environments that combine content management systems with translation memory technology, the percentage of un-translated segments per new document remains fairly high. While it is certainly possible to manage content on the sentence/segment level, the current best practice seems to be to chunk at the topic level. Which means that reuse occurs at a fairly high level of granularity.

== Sources ==
- AMORES CARREDANO, Jose Javier. Automatic translation systems[on line]. Available in: http://quark.prbb.org/19/019046.htm [Date of view: 29 May 2011]
- AECMA: AECMA Simplified English: A Guide for the Preparation of Aircraft Maintenance Documentation in the International Aerospace Maintenance Language, Bruselas, 1995.
- Grimaila, A.; Chandioux, J.: "Made to measure solutions". In: John Newton, ed.: Computers in Translation: A Practical Appraisal, Londres, Routledge, 1992: 33-45.
- Hartley, A.F.; Paris, C.L.: «Multi-lingual document production: from support for translating to support for authoring», Machine Translation (Special Issue on new tools for human translators) 1997; 12 (12): 109-129.
- Ide, I; Véronis, J.: «Introduction to the Special Issue on Word Sense Disambiguation: The State of the Art», Computational Linguistics 1998; 24 (1): 1-40.
- Lehrberger, L.; Bourbeau, L.: Machine Translation: Linguistic Characteristics of machine translation Systems and General Methodology of Evaluation, Amsterdam/Filadelfia, John Benjamins, 1988.
