= Globish (Gogate) =

Constructed language

- Parallel English
- Pronunciation: /ˈɡloʊbɪʃ/
- Created by: Madhukar Gogate
- Setting and usage: international auxiliary language
- Purpose: Constructed language: Globish
- Writing system: Latin
- Sources: Modern English

Language codes
- ISO 639-3: –

Globish (also known as Parallel English) is a constructed language created by Madhukar Gogate that attempts to simplify English, including the use of phonetic spelling, and the removal of most punctuation and capital letters. It was presented to the Simplified Spelling Society (now known as English Spelling Society) of the United Kingdom in 1998. According to its creator, it can be considered an artificial English dialect, as proof of the possibility of simplifying the orthography and pronunciation of standard English.

== Alphabets ==
Globish uses ISO Latin Alphabet, with no diacritics or upper cases.

- Letters: a b c d e f g h i j k l m n o p r s t u v w y z
- Digraphs: aa ae au ch dh ee ei oo sh th zh

== See also ==
- Globish (Nerrière)
