= Simple English Wikipedia =

Basic/Learning English edition of Wikipedia

- Logo of the Simple English Wikipedia

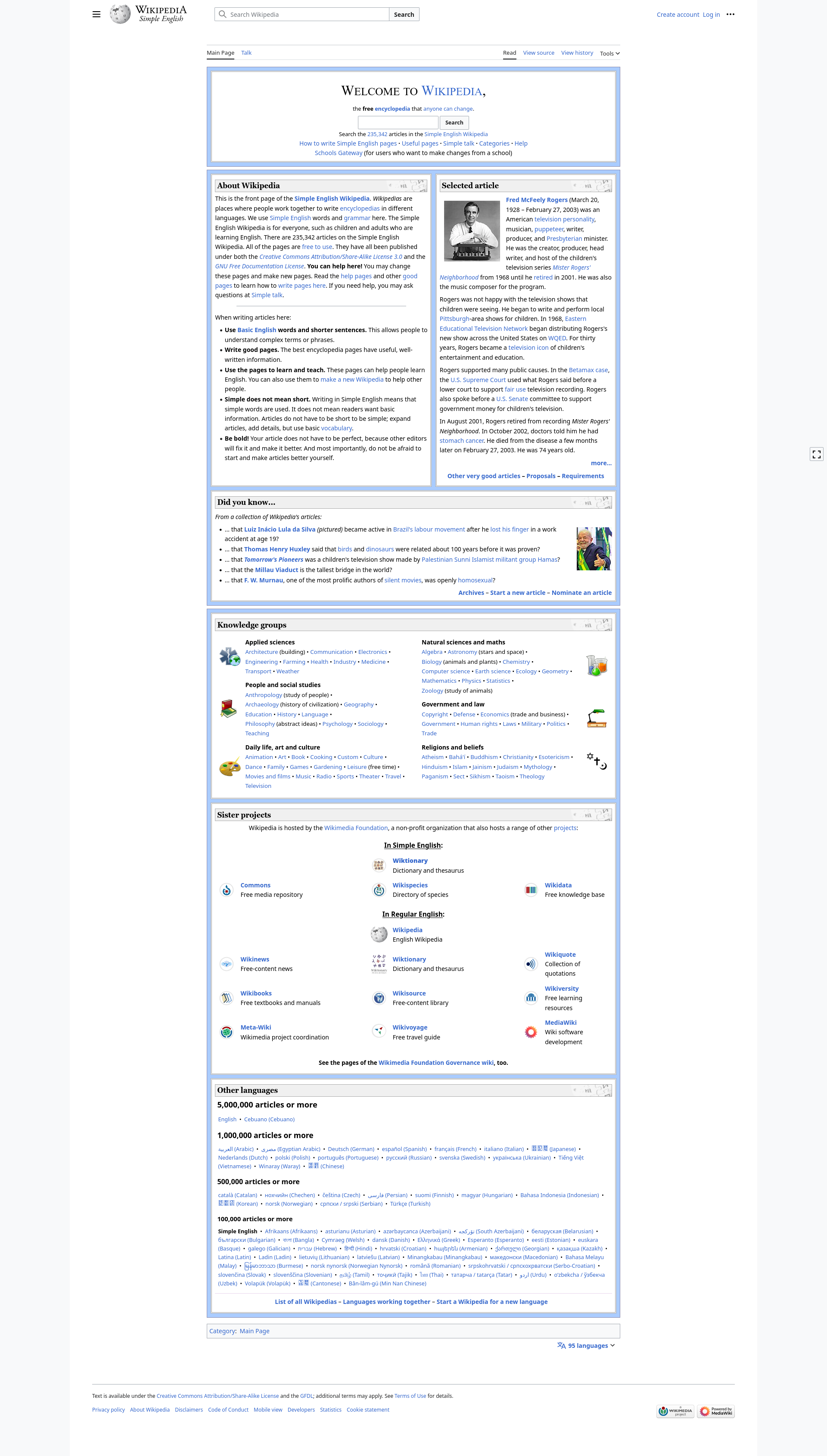
- Screenshot The homepage of the Simple English Wikipedia
- Website type: Online encyclopedia
- Available in: Basic English; Learning English
- Owner: Wikimedia Foundation
- Website: simple.wikipedia.org
- Commercial: No
- Registration: Optional
- Users: 1,883,288 users, 22 administrators as of 12 November 2026
- Launched: 18 September 2001
- Content license: Creative Commons Attribution/ Share-Alike 4.0 (most text also dual-licensed under GFDL); Media licensing varies

The Simple English Wikipedia is a modified English language edition of Wikipedia written primarily in Basic English and Learning English. It is one of ten Wikipedias written in an Anglic language or English-based pidgin or creole. The site has the stated aim of providing an encyclopedia "for everyone, such as children and adults who are learning English".

Simple English Wikipedia's basic presentation style makes it helpful for beginners learning English. Its simpler word structure and syntax, while missing some nuances, can make information easier to understand when compared with the regular English Wikipedia.

== History ==
The Simple English Wikipedia was launched on 18 September 2001.

In 2012, Andrew Lih, a Wikipedian and author, told NBC News' Helen A.S. Popkin that the Simple English Wikipedia does not "have a high standing in the Wikipedia community", and that it had never had a clear purpose. Popkin felt it was unclear whether the site was aimed at younger users, or intended to present simpler versions of complex articles.

Material from the Simple English Wikipedia formed the basis for One Encyclopedia per Child, a project in One Laptop per Child that ended in 2014.

In 2018, a proposal was raised on the Wikimedia Foundation's Meta-Wiki that the Simple English Wikipedia be closed on the grounds that there was no proof that the target audience was reading it. The proposal was rejected on the basis that there was no policy justification for closing the wiki and there was no consensus to do so.

As of November 2026, the site contains over 287,000 content pages. It has more than 1,883,000 registered users, of whom 3,426 have made an edit in the past month.

== Website structure ==
The articles on the Simple English Wikipedia are usually shorter than their English Wikipedia counterparts, typically presenting only basic information. Tim Dowling of The Guardian newspaper explained that "the Simple English version tends to stick to commonly accepted facts". The interface is also more simply labeled; for instance, the "Random article" link on the English Wikipedia is replaced with a "Show any page" link; users are invited to "change" rather than "edit" pages; clicking on a red link shows a "page not created" message rather than the usual "page does not exist". The project encourages, but does not enforce, the use of a vocabulary of around 1,500 commonly used English words that is based on Basic English, an 850-word controlled natural language created by Charles Kay Ogden in the 1920s.

== See also ==
- Plain English
- Readability
