= ClearTalk =

Controlled natural language

ClearTalk is a controlled natural language—a kind of a formal language for expressing information that is designed to be both human-readable (being based on English) and easily processed by a computer.

Anyone who can read English can immediately read ClearTalk, and the people who write ClearTalk learn to write it while using it. The ClearTalk system itself does most of the training through use: the restrictions are shown by menus and templates and are enforced by immediate syntactic checks. By consistently using ClearTalk for its output, a system reinforces the acceptable syntactic forms.

It is used by CODE4, the experimental knowledge management software Ikarus, and by a knowledge base management system Fact Guru.

ClearTalk is easily readable by most people who can read English, and requires very little training to write. Databases of information have been written using ClearTalk by a 9-year old human.

More than 25,000 facts have been encoded in ClearTalk.

ClearTalk allows varying degrees of formality or specificity, allowing the author to choose to leave or remove ambiguity.

ClearTalk was created in 1988 and fell out of use about 2006. It is the oldest controlled natural language with a formal representation.
