= Plain English =

Simple terms in the English language

Plain English (also referred to as layman's terms) is a mode of writing or speaking the English language intended to be easy to understand regardless of one's familiarity with a given topic. It usually avoids the use of rare words and uncommon euphemisms to explain the subject. Plain English wording is intended to be suitable for almost anyone, and it allows for good understanding to help readers know a topic. It is considered a part of plain language.

== Etymology ==
The term derives from the 16th-century idiom "in plain English", meaning "in clear, straightforward language" as well as the Latin planus ("flat").

Another name for the term, layman's terms, is derived from the idiom "in layman's terms" which refers to language phrased simply enough that a layman, or common person without expertise on the subject, can understand.

== History ==
=== United Kingdom ===
In 1946, writer George Orwell wrote an essay titled "Politics and the English Language", where he criticized the dangers of "ugly and inaccurate" contemporary written English. The essay focuses particularly on politics where pacification can be used to mean "...defenceless villages are bombarded from the air, the inhabitants driven out into the countryside, the cattle machine-gunned, the huts set on fire with incendiary bullets...".

In 1948, HM Treasury asked Sir Ernest Gowers to provide a guide to officials on avoiding pompous and over-elaborate writing. He wrote, "writing is an instrument for conveying ideas from one mind to another; the writer's job is to make his reader apprehend his meaning readily and precisely."

Gowers' guide was published as a slim paperback Plain Words, a guide to the use of English in 1948, followed by a sequel The ABC of Plain Words in 1951, and a hardback book combining both, The Complete Plain Words, in 1954 – which has never been out of print since. Gowers argued that legal English was a special case, saying that legal drafting:

...is a science, not an art; it lies in the province of mathematics rather than of literature, and its practise needs long apprenticeship. It is prudently left to a specialised legal branch of the Service. The only concern of the ordinary official is to learn to understand it, to act as interpreter of it to ordinary people, and to be careful not to let his own style of writing be tainted by it...

There is a trend toward plainer language in legal documents. Plain English Campaign has been campaigning since 1979 "against gobbledygook, jargon and misleading public information." The campaign has helped many government departments and other official organisations with their documents, reports and publications. They believe that everyone should have access to clear and concise information." The 1999 "Unfair Terms in Consumer Contracts" regulations mandate "plain and intelligible" language.

An inquiry into the 2005 London bombings recommended that emergency services should always use plain English. It found that verbosity can lead to misunderstandings that could cost lives.

=== Ireland ===
The National Adult Literacy Agency (NALA) promotes plain English training and provision in Ireland. Since 2005, NALA has supported organisations and government departments to use plain English through its training, style guides and editing work. In 2019, a Draft Plain Language Act (2019) supported by NALA received cross-party support, but Brexit discussions and then COVID-19 put the draft act on hold. NALA continues to support domestic and international efforts to make information accessible to all (particularly those with literacy and numeracy needs).

In early 2020, NALA developed an A-Z plain English guide to COVID-19 terms, and continues to provide support and advice to those who wish to improve the quality and clarity of their information. It also supports and contributes to evolving international plain language standards.

=== United States ===
In the US, the Plain Language Movement in government communication started in the 1970s. The Paperwork Reduction Act was introduced in 1976, and in 1978 President Carter issued executive orders intended to make government regulations "cost-effective and easy-to-understand by those who were required to comply with them." Many agencies now have long-standing policies mandating plain language; in 2010, this was made a federal requirement with the Plain Writing Act.

==== Legal writing ====
In legal writing, David Mellinkoff, a professor at the UCLA School of Law, is widely credited with singlehandedly launching the plain English movement in American law with the 1963 publication of The Language of the Law. In 1977, New York became the first state to pass legislation requiring plain English in consumer contracts and leases. In 1979, Richard Wydick published Plain English for Lawyers. Plain English writing style is now a legal duty for companies registering securities under the Securities Act of 1933, due to rules the Securities and Exchange Commission (SEC) adopted in 1998. In 2011, PLAIN (Plain Language Action and Information Network) published Federal Plain Language Guidelines.

Linguist and law school professor, Peter Tiersma, wrote an article titled Instructions to jurors: Redrafting California's jury instructions in The Routledge Handbook of Forensic Linguistics in 2010. He outlines the history of legal trials and how pattern jury instructions were developed in order to create an atmosphere in which jurors are given pertinent information to a case in order to determine factual evidence and guilt of an accused individual. Throughout the 1930s and 1940s in California, a panel comprising judges and lawyers drafted pattern jury instructions.

These standardized jury instructions were problematic, as they were written using technical language rather than in plain English. In the late 1970s, Robert and Veda Charrow studied jury instructions for comprehensibility, where individuals were asked to verbally summarize pattern jury instructions. The participants accounted for only one-third of relevant information given in the jury instructions. The Charrows further identified ways the language made instructions given to member of a jury difficult to understand. After fixing the instructions to use more understandable words, understanding got better by 47%.

Tiersma provides examples of jury instructions in both legal English and plain English. In the Book of Approved Jury Instructions (BAJI) instructions regarding the care of motorists when operating a motor vehicle read:

BAJI 5.50. Duty of Motorists and Pedestrians Using Public Highway

Every person using a public street or highway, whether as a pedestrian or as a driver of a vehicle, has a duty to exercise ordinary care at all times to avoid placing himself or others in danger and to use like care to avoid an accident from which an injury might result.
A "vehicle" is a device by which any person or property may be propelled, moved, or drawn upon a highway.

A "pedestrian" is any person who is afoot or who is using a means of conveyance propelled by human power other than a bicycle. The word "pedestrian" also includes any person who is operating a self-propelled wheelchair, invalid tricycle, or motorized quadrangle and, by reason of physical disability, is otherwise unable to move about as a pedestrian, as earlier defined.

Tiersma points out several confusing terms and formal jargon used in this definition that would be difficult for jury participants to understand. He highlights "to use like care" as being overly formal and "pedestrian" as being atypically defined including individuals using wheelchairs and "motorized quadrangles". The California Jury Instructions: Criminal (CACI) reworked these instructions and read:

CACI 700. Basic Standard of Care A person must use reasonable care in driving a vehicle. Drivers must keep a lookout for pedestrians, obstacles, and other vehicles. They must also control the speed and movement of their vehicles. The failure to use reasonable care in driving a vehicle is negligence.

The CACI instructions are in common language and are more direct. Jury instructions that are more direct have been criticized, saying that using more understandable words would make the instructions' legal meaning less precise, though these criticisms have been refuted.

==== Medical writing ====
In medical writing, plain language serves to meet patients at their level of health literacy. As defined by the Institute of Medicine's report, health literacy is "the degree to which individuals have the capacity to obtain, process, and understand basic health information and services needed to make appropriate health decisions."

In April 2004, the Institute of Medicine (IOM) and the Agency for Healthcare Research and Quality (AHRQ) released health literacy reports citing the 1992 National Adult Literacy Survey (NALS) results as a cause for concern. The 1992 NALS indicated that nearly half of Americans demonstrated limited literacy skills. The NALS did not explicitly look at health literacy, but it did cover health-related tasks. In response, researchers developed methods to measure health literacy, such as the Health Activities Literacy Scale (HALS). Many governmental organizations, such as the Centers for Disease Control and Prevention (CDC) and the National Institutes of Health (NIH), continue to research methods and produce materials for implementing plain language and meeting health literacy needs.

Using plain language in addition to, or in place of, medical terminology can help patients make informed health decisions. Potential obstacles to high health literacy can stem from socioeconomic factors, such as race and poverty. Research continues to develop on best practices for plain language in the medical field. Meanwhile, various organizations have resources available, such as the AHRQ's Health Literacy Improvement Tools, the United States National Library of Medicine's MedlinePlus website, and the CDC's Plain Language Materials and Resources page.

== See also ==
- Simplified Technical English, used by the international aerospace and defense industries
- List of Germanic and Latinate equivalents in English
- Scribes: The American Society of Legal Writers
- Simple English Wikipedia
- Corporate jargon
- Legalese
- Plain Language Act 2022
- Psychobabble
- Technobabble
- Buzzword
- Weasel word
- Basic English
- New General Service List
- Français Fondamental
- Vocabolario di base (in Italian: Basic Italian)
