= Français fondamental =

Simplified version of French

Français fondamental (French for 'Fundamental French') is a list of words and grammatical concepts, devised in the beginning of the 1950s for teaching foreigners and residents of the French Union, France's colonial empire. A series of investigations in the 1950s and 1960s showed that a small number of words are used the same way orally and in writing in all circumstances; thus a limited number of grammatical rules were necessary for a functional language.

== Origins ==
Français fondamental was developed by the Centre d'Etude du Français Élémentaire, which was renamed to the Centre de Recherche et d'Étude pour la Diffusion du Français (CREDIF) in 1959. It was headed by linguist Georges Gougenheim. The Ministry of Education of France sanctioned and promoted it as a method of learning French. The use of français fondamental was common in French textbooks, and especially prevalent in audiovisual learning methods used in the 1960s.

Gougenheim, Réné Michea, Paul Rivenc, and Aurélien Sauvageot served as researchers for the project. There are 1,475 words in the "first degree" and 1,609 words in the "second degree."

== See also ==
- Basic English
- Vocabolario di base (in Italian: Basic Italian)
