= Basic English =

English-based controlled language

- Created by: Charles Kay Ogden
- Date: 1925
- Setting and usage: controlled natural language
- Purpose: Constructed language: Basic English
- Writing system: English alphabet Unified English Braille
- Sources: Modern English

Language codes
- ISO 639-3: –
- IETF: en-basiceng

Basic English (a backronym for British Academic Scientific International and Commercial English) is a controlled language based on standard English, but with a greatly simplified vocabulary and grammar. It was created by the linguist and philosopher Charles Kay Ogden as an international auxiliary language, and as an aid for teaching English as a second language. It was presented in Ogden's 1930 book Basic English: A General Introduction with Rules and Grammar.

The first work on Basic English was written by two Englishmen, Ivor Richards of Harvard University and Charles Kay Ogden of the University of Cambridge in England. The design of Basic English drew heavily on the semiotic theory put forward by Ogden and Richards in their 1923 book The Meaning of Meaning.

Ogden's Basic, and the concept of a simplified English, gained its greatest publicity just after the Allied victory in World War II as a means for world peace. He was convinced that the world needed to gradually eradicate minority languages and use as much as possible only one: English, in either a simple or complete form.

Although Basic English was not built into a program, similar simplifications have been devised for various international uses. Richards promoted its use in schools in China. It has influenced the creation of Voice of America's Learning English for news broadcasting, and Simplified Technical English, another English-based controlled language designed to write technical manuals. What survives of Ogden's Basic English is the basic 850-word list used as the beginner's vocabulary of the English language taught worldwide, especially in Asia.

== Design principles ==
Ogden tried to simplify English while keeping it normal for native speakers, by specifying grammar restrictions and a controlled small vocabulary which makes an extensive use of paraphrasing. Most notably, Ogden allowed only 18 verbs, which he called "operators". His "General Introduction" says, "There are no 'verbs' in Basic English", with the underlying assumption that, as noun use in English is very straightforward but verb use/conjugation is not, the elimination of verbs would be a welcome simplification. (Note: A good summary in Bill Templer: Towards a People's English: Back to BASIC in EIL Humanising Language Teaching.)

What the World needs most is about 1,000 more dead languages—and one more alive.

— C. K. Ogden, The System of Basic English

== Word lists ==
Ogden's word lists include only word roots, which in practice are extended with the defined set of affixes and the full set of forms allowed for any available word (noun, pronoun, or the limited set of verbs). (Note: See the list of words which are assumed and not counted for details.) The 850 core words of Basic English are found in Wiktionary's Basic English word list. This core is theoretically enough for everyday life. However, Ogden prescribed that any student should learn an additional 150-word list for everyday work in some particular field, by adding a list of 100 words particularly useful in a general field (e.g., science, verse, business), along with a 50-word list from a more specialised subset of that general field, to make a basic 1000-word vocabulary for everyday work and life.

Moreover, Ogden assumed that any student should already be familiar with (and thus may only review) a core subset of around 200 "international" words. Therefore, a first-level student should graduate with a core vocabulary of around 1200 words. A realistic general core vocabulary could contain around 2000 words (the core 850 words, plus 200 international words, and 1000 words for the general fields of trade, economics, and science). It is enough for a "standard" English level. This 2000 word vocabulary represents "what any learner should know". At this level students could start to move on their own.

Ogden's Basic English 2000 word list and Voice of America's Special English 1500 word list serve as dictionaries for the Simple English Wikipedia.

== Rules ==
Basic English includes a simple grammar for modifying or combining its 850 words to talk about additional meanings (morphological derivation or inflection). The grammar is based on English, but simplified.

- Plural nouns are formed by adding -s or related forms, as in drinks, boxes, or countries.
- Nouns are formed with the endings -er (as in prisoner) or -ing (building).
- Adjectives are formed with the endings -ing (boiling) or -ed (mixed).
- Adverbs can be formed by adding -ly (for example tightly) to words that Basic English calls "qualities" (adjectives that describe objects).
- The words more and most are used for comparison (for example more complex), but -er and -est may appear in common use (cheaper).
- Negatives can be formed with un- (unwise).
- The word do is used in questions, as it is in English (Do you have some?).
- Both pronouns and what Basic English calls "operators" (a set of ten verbs) use the different forms they have in English (for example I go to him, He goes to me).
- Compound words can be formed by combining two nouns (e.g. soapbox) or a noun and a preposition, which Basic English calls "directives" (sunup).
- International words, words that are the same or similar in English and other European languages (e.g. radio), use the English form. English forms are also used for numbers, dates, money, or measurements.
- Any technical terms or special vocabulary needed for a task should be written in inverted commas and then be explained in the text using words from the Basic English vocabulary (for example the 'vocabulary' is the list of words).

== Criticism ==
Like all international auxiliary languages (or IALs), Basic English may be criticised as inevitably based on personal preferences, and is thus, paradoxically, inherently divisive. Moreover, like all natural-language-based IALs, Basic is subject to criticism as unfairly biased towards the native speaker community. (Note: For instance, a sample quotation from the auxlang mailing list archives and another from noted linguist Robert A. Hall, Jr.)

As a teaching aid for English as a second language, Basic English has been criticised for the choice of the core vocabulary and for its grammatical constraints. (Note: For instance, by proponents of Essential World English. See a summary of EWE for instance and, again, the linguist Robert A. Hall, Jr.)

In 1944, readability expert Rudolf Flesch published an article in Harper's Magazine, "How Basic is Basic English?" in which he said, "It's not basic, and it's not English." The essence of his complaint is that the vocabulary is too restricted, and, as a result, the text ends up being awkward and more difficult than necessary. He also argues that the words in the Basic vocabulary were arbitrarily selected, and notes that there had been no empirical studies showing that it made language simpler.

In his 1948 paper "A Mathematical Theory of Communication", Claude Shannon contrasted the limited vocabulary of Basic English with James Joyce's Finnegans Wake, a work noted for a wide vocabulary. Shannon notes that the lack of vocabulary in Basic English leads to a very high level of redundancy, whereas Joyce's large vocabulary "is alleged to achieve a compression of semantic content".

== Literary references ==
In the novel The Shape of Things to Come, published in 1933, H. G. Wells depicted Basic English as the lingua franca of a new elite that after a prolonged struggle succeeds in uniting the world and establishing a totalitarian world government. In the future world of Wells' vision, virtually all members of humanity know this language.

From 1942 to 1944, George Orwell was a proponent of Basic English, but in 1945, he became critical of universal languages. Basic English later inspired his use of Newspeak in Nineteen Eighty-Four.

Evelyn Waugh criticized his own 1945 novel Brideshead Revisited, which he had previously called his magnum opus, in the preface of the 1959 reprint: "It [World War II] was a bleak period of present privation and threatening disaster—the period of soya beans and Basic English—and in consequence the book is infused with a kind of gluttony, for food and wine, for the splendours of the recent past, and for rhetorical and ornamental language that now, with a full stomach, I find distasteful."

In his story "Gulf", science fiction writer Robert A. Heinlein used a constructed language called Speedtalk, in which every Basic English word is replaced with a single phoneme, as an appropriate means of communication for a race of genius supermen.

== Samples ==
The Lord's Prayer has been often used for an impressionistic language comparison:

| Basic English (BBE) | English (NRSV) |
|---|---|
| Our Father in heaven, may your name be kept holy. Let your kingdom come. Let your pleasure be done, as in heaven, so on earth. Give us this day bread for our needs. And make us free of our debts, as we have made free those who are in debt to us. And let us not be put to the test, but keep us safe from the Evil One. | Our Father in heaven, hallowed be your name. Your kingdom come. Your will be done, on earth as it is in heaven. Give us this day our daily bread. And forgive us our debts, as we also have forgiven our debtors. And do not bring us to the time of trial, but rescue us from the evil one. |

== See also ==
- Academic word list
- Bible in Basic English
- Controlled vocabulary
- E-Prime
- Français Fondamental
- Vocabolario di base (Italian for 'Basic Italian')
- Globish
- New General Service List
- International English
- Plain English
- Plain language
- Readability
- Seaspeak
- Simplified English
- Learning English
- Standard Marine Communication Phrases
- Swadesh list
