= Learning English (version of English) =

Simplified English in Voice of America

Learning English (previously known as Special English) is a controlled version of the English language first used on October 19, 1959, and still presented daily by the United States broadcasting service Voice of America (VOA). World news and other programs are read one-third slower than regular VOA English. Reporters avoid idioms and use a core vocabulary of about 1,500 words, plus any terms needed to explain a story. The intended audience is intermediate to advanced learners of English. In 1962 the VOA published the first edition of the Word Book.

VOA has teamed up with the University of Oregon and produced free online training Let's Teach English for English language educators. The series is based on the Women Teaching Women English and is aimed for adult beginning level learners.

== Examples ==
VOA Learning English has multiple daily newscasts and 14 weekly features. These include reports on agriculture, economics, health and current events. Other programs explore American society, U.S. history, idiomatic expressions, science, and arts and entertainment.

For example, a May 18, 2010, script described rheumatoid arthritis this way:

Rheumatoid arthritis is a painful disease that can destroy joints. Women are three times more likely to get it than men. Rheumatoid arthritis is considered an autoimmune disease, a disease where the body attacks healthy cells. The exact cause is unknown. But in a recent study, an experimental drug showed signs of halting the disorder in laboratory mice.

A program from July 15, 2010, dealt with patent law:

Recently, the United States Supreme Court decided a case on the property rights of inventors. The question was whether a business method is enough of an invention to receive a patent. Patents are a form of intellectual property. They give legal protections to individuals and companies against the copying of their inventions.

A remembrance of Michael Jackson aired on July 5, 2009, shortly after his death:

Today we tell about one of the most famous performers in the world, Michael Jackson. Known as the 'King of Pop', Jackson sold more than seven hundred fifty million albums over his career. Michael Jackson redefined popular culture with his energetic music, dance moves and revolutionary music videos. But Jackson’s huge success as a performer was not always easy. He was a complex individual with an often troubled private life.

For English learners, the service not only provides clear and simple news and information, it also helps them improve their use of American English. In some countries such as the People's Republic of China, VOA Special English is increasingly popular for junior and intermediate English learners. Many teachers around the world, including at the university level, use the programs for language and content.

The BBC and China Radio International have both used the name "Special English" for their slow speed English broadcasts, but they do not appear to have applied the full methodology of the VOA original.

== Specialized English ==
Specialized English is a dialect of Special English developed and used by Feba Radio, and now used by staff in the U.S. and in the U.K. The same parameters apply as for Special English — slow speed, short sentences and restricted vocabulary. The word list has over 90% commonality with that of VOA Special English.

== See also ==
- Basic English
