= Indian English =

Variety of English language in indian culture

- Native to: India
- Region: South Asia
- Native speakers: 250,000; L2 speakers: 83 million L3 speakers: 46 million 128 million total speakers (2011)
- Language family: Indo-European: Germanic; West Germanic; Ingvaeonic; Anglo-Frisian; Anglic; English; British English; South Asian English; Indian English
- Early forms: Proto-Indo-European: Proto-Germanic; Proto-West Germanic; Proto-English; Old English; Middle English; Early Modern English
- Writing system: Latin (English alphabet); Unified English Braille

Official status
- Official language in: India

Language codes
- ISO 639-1: en
- ISO 639-2: eng
- ISO 639-3: eng
- Glottolog: indi1255
- IETF: en-IN

Example of an Indian woman's speech
Arundhati Roy speaking English in the BBC Radio 4 programme Bookclub.

Indian English is the set of English language varieties native to India. It is spoken both in the Republic of India and among Indian diaspora. The country has one of the world's largest English-speaking communities, English being enshrined in the Constitution of India and one of the two languages used by the Government of India for communication. It is also an official language in eight states and seven union territories of India, as well as one of the official languages in five other states and one union territory. Furthermore, English is the sole official language of the Judiciary of India unless the state governor or legislature mandates the use of a regional language or if the President of India has given approval for the use of regional languages in courts. Before the dissolution of the British Empire on the Indian subcontinent, the term Indian English broadly referred to South Asian English, also known as British Indian English.

== Names ==
The first occurrence of the term Indian English dates from 1696, though the term did not become common until the 19th century. In the colonial era, the most common terms in use were Anglo-Indian English, or simply Anglo-Indian, both dating from 1860. Other less common terms in use were Indo-Anglian (dating from 1897) and Indo-English (1912). An item of Anglo-Indian English was known as an Anglo-Indianism from 1851.

In the modern era, a range of colloquial portmanteau words for Indian English have been used. The earliest of these is Indlish (recorded from 1962), and others include Indiglish (1974), Indenglish (1979), Indglish (1984), Indish (1984), Inglish (1985) and Indianlish (2007). Sometimes, Indian English is also referred to as Macaulay's English after Thomas Babington Macaulay.

== History ==
=== British India ===
The English language established a foothold on the Indian subcontinent with the granting of the East India Company charter by Queen Elizabeth I in 1600 and the subsequent establishment of trading ports in coastal cities such as Surat, Mumbai (called Bombay before 1995), Chennai (called Madras before 1996), and Kolkata (called Calcutta before 2001).

English-language public instruction began in the subcontinent in the 1830s during the rule of the British East India Company. In 1835, English replaced Persian as the official language of the East India Company. Lord Macaulay played a major role in introducing English and Western concepts into educational institutions in British-India. He supported the replacement of Persian by English as the official language, the use of English as the medium of instruction in all schools, and the training of English-speaking Indians as teachers. Throughout the 1840s and 1850s, primary, middle, and high schools were opened in many districts of British India, with most high schools offering English language instruction in some subjects. In 1857, just before the end of East India Company rule, universities that were modeled on the University of London and used English as the medium of instruction were established in Bombay, Calcutta and Madras. During the British Raj (1858 to 1947), English-language penetration increased throughout the subcontinent. This was driven in part by the gradually increasing hiring of Indians in the civil services. At the time of Indian independence in 1947, English was the only functional lingua franca in the region.

The Oxford English Dictionary stated that in this period, "English ceased to be a language used solely by foreigners in India, and became the dominant form of communication in Indian education, government, commerce, literature, and print media."

=== Republic of India ===
After the independence and Partition of British India, Modern Standard Hindi was declared the first official language in the new Indian Republic, and attempts were made to declare Hindi the sole national language. Due to protests from Tamil Nadu and other non-Hindi-speaking states, it was decided to temporarily retain English for official purposes until at least 1965. By the end of this period, however, opposition from non-Hindi states was still too strong to have Hindi declared the sole language. With this in mind, the English Language Amendment Bill declared English to be an associate language "until such time as all non-Hindi States had agreed to its being dropped." This has not occurred, and English is still widely used. For instance, it is the only reliable means of day-to-day communication between the central government and the non-Hindi states.

The view of the English language among many Indians has changed over time. It used to be associated primarily with colonialism; it is now primarily associated with economic progress, and English continues to be an official language of India. Indian men who speak fluent English have been found to earn 34% higher hourly salaries than men who don't speak English.

While there is an assumption that English is readily available in India, studies show that its usage is actually restricted to the elite, because of inadequate education to large parts of the Indian population. It has been suggested that Indian English, rather than British English, should be taught in schools, to allow for international cooperation while valuing local cultural features "due to a set of unique lexical, grammatical, phonological and discourse features that would allow it to act as both a lingua franca within the country and on the international stage". The use of outdated teaching methods and the poor grasp of English exhibited by the authors of many guidebooks disadvantage students who rely on these books, giving India only a moderate proficiency in English.

In addition, many features of Indian English were imported into Bhutan due to the dominance of Indian-style education and teachers in the country after it withdrew from its isolation in the 1960s.

== Status ==
After gaining independence from the British Raj in 1947, English remained an official language of the new Dominion of India and later the Republic of India. After the partition of India, Pakistani English and Bangladeshi English were considered separate from Indian English.

In the 21st century, only a few hundred thousand Indians, or less than 0.1% of the total population, report English as their first language, and around 30% of the Indian population can speak English to some extent.

According to the 2011 Census, 129 million Indians (10.6%) spoke English. 259,678 (0.02%) Indians reported English as their first language. It concluded that approximately 83 million Indians (6.8%) reported English as their second language, and 46 million (3.8%) reported it as their third language, making English the second-most spoken language in India.

According to the 2001 Census, 12.18% of Indians knew English at that time. Of those, approximately 200,000 reported that it was their first language, 86 million reported that it was their second, and 39 million reported that it was their third.

According to the 2005 India Human Development Survey, of 41,554 surveyed, households reported that 72% of men (29,918) spoke no English, 28% of them (11,635) spoke at least some English, and 5% of them (2,077, roughly 17.9% of those who spoke at least some English) spoke fluent English. Among women, 83% (34,489) spoke no English, 17% (7,064) spoke at least some English, and 3% (1,246, roughly 17.6% of those who spoke at least some English) spoke English fluently. According to statistics from the District Information System for Education (DISE) of the National University of Educational Planning and Administration under the Ministry of Human Resource Development, Government of India, enrollment in English-medium schools increased by 50% between 2008–09 and 2013–14. The number of English-medium school students in India increased from over 15 million in 2008–09 to 29 million by 2013–14.

India ranks 52 out of 111 countries in the 2022 EF English Proficiency Index published by the EF Education First. The index gives the country a score of 496 indicating "moderate proficiency". India ranks 6th out of 24 Asian countries included in the index.

As a multilingual country, English is the lingua franca among different regions of India. Writing for The New York Times, journalist Manu Joseph stated in 2011 that, due to the prominence and usage of the language and the desire for English-language education, "English is the de facto national language of India. It is a bitter truth." In his book, In Search of Indian English: History, Politics and Indigenisation, Ranjan Kumar Auddy shows that the history of the rise of Indian nationalism and the history of the emergence of Indian English are deeply inter-related. Purdue University stated due to the prevalence of the language in business operations in India, it is "uncommon to find a business enterprise using non-English documents".

=== Court language ===
Under the Indian Constitution, English is the language of India's Supreme Court and of all the high courts of India. However, as allowed by the Constitution, Hindi is also used in courts in Bihar, Madhya Pradesh, Uttar Pradesh, and Rajasthan by virtue of special presidential approval. As of 2018, the high courts of Punjab and Haryana were also awaiting presidential approval to use Hindi alongside English, and the Madras High Court has been taking steps to use Tamil alongside English.

== Features ==
Indian English generally uses the Indian numbering system. Idiomatic forms derived from Indian literary languages and vernaculars have been absorbed into Indian English. Nevertheless, there remains general homogeneity in phonetics, vocabulary, and phraseology among various dialects of Indian English.

Formal written publications in English in India tend to use lakh/crore for Indian currency and Western numbering for foreign currencies like dollars and pounds, although lakh and crore are also used to refer to other large numbers such as population sizes. These terms are not used by other English-speakers, who have to learn what they mean in order to read Indian English news articles.

== Hinglish and other hybrid languages ==
The term Hinglish is a portmanteau of the languages English and Hindi. This typically refers to the macaronic hybrid use of Hindustani and English. It is often the growing preferred language of the urban and semi-urban educated Indian youth, as well as the Indian diaspora abroad. The Hindi film industry, more popularly known as Bollywood, incorporates considerable amounts of Hinglish as well. Many internet platforms and voice commands on Google also recognise Hinglish. When Hindi–Urdu is viewed as a single language called Hindustani, the portmanteaus Hinglish and Urdish mean the same code-mixed tongue, where the former term is used predominantly in modern India and the latter term predominantly in Pakistan.

Other macaronic hybrids such as Minglish (Marathi and English), Banglish (Bengali and English), Manglish (Malayalam and English), Kanglish (Kannada and English), Tenglish (Telugu and English), and Tanglish or Tamglish (Tamil and English) exist in South India.

== Phonology ==
=== Vowels ===
In general, Indian English has fewer peculiarities in its vowel sounds than the consonants, especially as spoken by native speakers of languages like Hindi, the vowel phoneme system having some similarities with that of English. Among the distinctive features of the vowel-sounds employed by some Indian English speakers:

General Indian English vowel phonemes
	Front		Central	Back	
	short	long	Central	long	short
Close	ɪ	iː		uː	ʊ
Close-mid	ɛ / e	eː	ɜː	oː	(o)
Open-mid	ɛ / e	(ɛː)	ə	ɔː / ɒː	(ɒ / ɔ)
Open		æː		ɑː	

Indian English Vowels Qualities
Lexical set	Subset	Value	Notes
Checked vowels
TRAP		[æ~a~e]	
BATH		[ɑː~a~æ~ä]	
DRESS		[ɛ~e]	
KIT		[ɪ~ɘ]	especially [ɘ] before /l/
LOT		[ɒ~ɔ~a]	
CLOTH		[ɒ~ɔ]	
FOOT		[ʊ]	
STRUT		[ʌ~ə~ɜ]	
Free vowels
PALM		[a~ä]	
FACE		[eː]	
FLEECE		[i]	
PRICE		[aɪ]	
GOAT		[oː]	
CHOICE		[ɔɪ]	
GOOSE		[u]	
MOUTH		[aʊ]	
THOUGHT		[ɔ~ɒ]	
Vowels + historical /r/
START		[ɑ(r)]	
SQUARE		[ɛ~eə(r)]	
NEAR		[ɪə(r)]	
NORTH		[ɒ(r)~ɔ(r)]	
FORCE		[o(r)~oə(r)~ɔə(r)]	occasionally merged with CURE
NURSE		[ə(r)~ʌ(r)~ɜ(r)]	
CURE		[ʊə(r)~oə(r)~ɔə(r)]	occasionally merged with FORCE
Reduced vowels
commA		[a, ə]	
lettER		[ə(r)]	
happY		[ɪ, i]	

- North Indians, especially a minority of English students and teachers along with some people in various professions like telephone customer service agents, often speak with a non-rhotic accent. Examples of this include flower pronounced as [flaʊ.ə], never as [nevə], water as [ʋɒtə], etc. Some South Indians, such as native Telugu speakers, speak with a rhotic accent, but the final /ə/ becomes an [a], and an alveolar tap [ɾ] is used for /r/, resulting in water and never as [wɒtaɾ] or [ʋɒʈaɾ] and [nevaɾ] respectively.
  - Features characteristic of North American English, such as rhoticity and r-coloured vowels, have been gaining influence on Indian English in recent years as cultural and economic ties increase between India and the United States.
- Many North Indians have an intonation pattern similar to Hiberno-English, which perhaps results from a similar pattern used while speaking Hindi.

==== Splits and mergers ====
- Indian English speakers do not necessarily make a clear distinction between /ɒ/ and /ɔː/ unlike Received Pronunciation (RP), i.e. they may have the cot-caught merger, with the target vowel ranging between either option.
- Most Indians have the trap–bath split of Received Pronunciation, affecting words such as class, staff and last (/klɑːs/, /stɑːf/ and /lɑːst/ respectively). Though the trap-bath split is prevalent in Indian English, it varies greatly. Many younger Indians who read and listen to American English do not have this split. Similar to Australian English, variability is especially present when the split occurs before nasal clusters in words such as dance, Francis, and answer.
- Most Indians do not have the hoarse-horse merger.

=== Consonants ===
		Labial	Dental/ Alveolar	Retroflex	Palatal (-alveolar)	Velar	Glottal
Nasal		m	n ~ ɳ			ŋ	
Plosive/ Affricate	voiceless	p	t̪ʰ	ʈ	tʃ	k	
Plosive/ Affricate	voiced	b	d̪	ɖ	dʒ	ɡ	
Fricative	voiceless	f ~ pʰ	s		ʃ	(x)	
Fricative	voiced	ʋ	(z)		(ʒ)		ɦ
Approximant	median	ʋ	(ɹ ~ ɻ)		j		
Approximant	lateral		l ~ ɭ				
Vibrant			ɾ ~ r ~ ɽ				

The following are the standard variations in Indian English:

- The voiceless plosives /p/, /t/, /k/ are always unaspirated in Indian English, (aspirated in cultivated form) whereas in RP, General American and most other English accents they are aspirated in word-initial or stressed syllables. Thus "pin" is pronounced [pɪn] in Indian English but [pʰɪn] in most other dialects. In native Indo-Aryan languages, a predominant language family in India, the distinction between aspirated and unaspirated plosives is phonemic, and the English stops are equated with the unaspirated rather than the aspirated phonemes of the local languages. The same is true of the voiceless postalveolar affricate /tʃ/. The local unvoiced aspirated plosives are instead equated with English fricatives, namely /f/ and /θ/.
- The alveolar stops English /d/, /t/ are often retroflex [ɖ], [ʈ], especially in the north of India. In Indian languages, there are two entirely distinct sets of coronal plosives: one dental and the other retroflex. Native speakers of Indian languages prefer to pronounce the English alveolar plosives sound as more retroflex than dental, and the use of retroflex consonants is a common feature of Indian English. In the Devanagari script of Hindi, all alveolar plosives of English are transcribed as their retroflex counterparts. One good reason for this is that unlike most other native Indian languages, Hindi does not have true retroflex plosives (Tiwari, [1955] 2001). The so-called retroflexes in Hindi are actually articulated as apical post-alveolar plosives, sometimes even with a tendency to come down to the alveolar region. So a Hindi speaker normally cannot distinguish the difference between their own apical post-alveolar plosives and English's alveolar plosives. Languages such as Tamil and Malayalam have true retroflex plosives, however, wherein the articulation is done with the tongue curved upwards and backwards at the roof of the mouth. This also causes (in parts of Uttar Pradesh, Madhya Pradesh and Bihar) the /s/ preceding alveolar /t/ to allophonically change to [ʃ] (⟨stop⟩, /stɒp/ → /ʃʈap/). Mostly in north India, some speakers allophonically further change the voiced retroflex plosives to voiced retroflex flap [ɽ], and the nasal /n/ to a nasalised retroflex flap. Among Malayalam speakers, the realisation of English /t, nd, n, l/ follows systematic rules. Word-initial they are typically realised as [ʈ, ɳɖ, n, l], while in non-initial positions it may be alveolar [t, nd, n, l] after front vowels or retroflex [ʈ, ɳɖ, ɳ, ɭ] elsewhere, depending on word structure. For example, better, kind, seen, peel are pronounced [bettɐr, kai̯nd(ə̆), siːn, piːl] (alveolar), whereas butter, count, soon, pool are pronounced [bɐʈʈɐr, kau̯ɳɖ(ə̆)~kau̯ɳʈ(ə̆), suːɳ, puːɭ] (retroflex). This is influenced by the fact that Malayalam already contrasts alveolar and retroflex consonants. There is no standalone [d] as Malayalam doesn't have it.
- Most major native languages of India lack the dental fricatives /θ/ and /ð/ (spelled with th), although [ð] occurs variably as intervocalic allophones in Gujarati and Tamil. Usually, the aspirated voiceless dental plosive [t̪ʰ] is substituted for /θ/ in the north (it would be unaspirated in the south) and the unaspirated voiced dental plosive [d̪], or possibly the aspirated version [d̪ʱ], is substituted for /ð/. For example, "thin" would be realised as [t̪ʰɪn] instead of /θɪn/ for North Indian speakers, whereas it would be pronounced unaspirated in the south.
- The English of Delhi often has yod-dropping after coronals, unlike RP.
- The rhotic consonant /r/ is pronounced by most speakers as an alveolar tap [ɾ], but may also be pronounced as a retroflex flap [ɽ] or alveolar trill [r] based on the influence by the native phonology, or an alveolar approximant [ɹ] like in most varieties of English.
- Indian English is variably rhotic; with pronunciations either being non-rhotic due to the traditional influence of RP, or generally rhotic due to the underlying phonotactics of the native Indo-Aryan and Dravidian languages.
  - In recent years, rhoticity has been increasing. Generally, American English is seen as having a large influence on the English language in India recently.
  - Many Indians with rhotic accents prefer to pronounce words with [aʊə] as [aː(r)], such as ⟨flower⟩ as [flaː(r)] and ⟨our⟩ as [aː(r)] or as [ɐʋɐr~ɐwɐ(r))], eg. ⟨flowers⟩ as [fɭɐʋeːɻs] among Malayalis, as opposed to [flaʊ.ə] and [aʊ.ə] in more non-rhotic varieties. Speakers with rhotic accents, especially some south Indians, may also pronounce word-final /ər/ as /ar/, resulting in water and never as /wɔːtar/ and /nevar/ respectively.
- Most Indian languages do not differentiate between /v/ (voiced labiodental fricative) and /w/ (voiced labial–velar approximant). Instead, many Indians use a frictionless voiced labiodental approximant [ʋ] for words with either sound, possibly in free variation with [v] and/or [w] depending upon region. Thus, wet and vet are often homophones.
- South Indians tend to curl the tongue (retroflex accentuation) less for /l/ and /n/.
- Sometimes, Indian speakers interchange /s/ and /z/, especially when plurals are being formed, unlike speakers of other varieties of English, who use [s] for the pluralisation of words ending in a voiceless consonant, [z] for words ending in a voiced consonant or vowel, and [ɨz] for words ending in a sibilant.
- In case of the postalveolar affricates /tʃ/ /dʒ/, native languages like Hindi have corresponding affricates articulated from the palatal region, rather than postalveolar, and they have more of a stop component than fricative; this is reflected in their English.
- Syllabic /l/, /m/ and /n/ are usually replaced by the VC clusters [əl], [əm] and [ən] (as in button /ˈbəʈən/), or if a high vowel precedes, by [il] (as in little /ˈliʈil/). Syllable nuclei in words with the spelling er/re (a schwa in RP and an r-coloured schwa in GA) are also replaced by VC clusters. e.g., metre, /ˈmiːtər/ → /ˈmiːʈər/.
- Indian English uses clear [l] in all instances like Irish English whereas other varieties use clear [l] in syllable-initial positions and dark l [ɫ] (velarised-L) in coda and syllabic positions.
- Voiced postalveolar fricative [ʒ] is largely nonexistent in most varieties.

The following are variations in Indian English due to language contact with Indian languages:

- Most Indian languages (with exceptions like Assamese, Kashmiri, Marathi and Urdu; and conscious pronunciation by Hindi, Punjabi, Dogri, etc. speakers) lack the voiced alveolar fricative /z/. A significant portion of Indians thus, even though their native languages do have its nearest equivalent: the unvoiced /s/, often use the voiced postalveolar affricate /dʒ(ʱ)/. This makes words such as ⟨zero⟩ and ⟨rosy⟩ sound as [ˈdʒiːro(ː)] and [ˈroːdʒiː] (the latter, especially in the North). This replacement is equally true for Persian and Arabic loanwords into Hindi. The probable reason is the confusion created by the use of the Devanagari grapheme ⟨ज⟩ (for /dʒ/) with the Nuqta to represent /z/ (as ⟨ज़⟩). A similar thing happens in other Indian languages like Bengali, with the letters for /dʒ/ (except Indian varieties of Nepali and Marathi where ⟨ज⟩ represents /dz/) usually being used to represent /z/. This is common among people without formal English education. In Telugu (plus even in Hindi and Punjabi to some extent) /z/ and /dʒ/ are allophones in some cases, so the words such as fridge /fɹɪdʒ/ become /friz/. Some do approximate /z/ with a /s/ like Malayali [ˈsiːro].
- In Assamese, /tʃ/ and /ʃ/ are pronounced as /s/; and /dʒ/ and /ʒ/ are pronounced as /z/. Retroflex and dental consonants are not present and only alveolar consonants are used unlike other Indian languages. Similar to Bengali and Odia, /v/ is pronounced as /bʱ/ and /β/ in Assamese. For example; change is pronounced as [sɛɪnz], vote is pronounced as [bʱot] and English is pronounced as [iŋlis].
- Again, in Awadhi, Bhojpuri, Chhattisgarhi, Kannauji and Odia, all instances of /ʃ/ are spoken like [s] (and [x] in Assamese), a phenomenon that is also apparent in their English. Exactly the opposite is seen for many Bengalis.
- Inability to pronounce certain (especially word-initial) consonant clusters by people of rural backgrounds (as with some Spanish, Portuguese and Persian speakers). This is usually dealt with by epenthesis. e.g., ⟨school⟩ /isˈkuːl/.
- Many Indians with lower exposure to English also may pronounce /f/ as an aspirated voiceless bilabial plosive [pʰ]. Again in Hindi Devanagari the loaned /f/ from Persian and Arabic is written by putting a dot beneath the grapheme for native [pʰ] ⟨फ⟩: ⟨फ़⟩. This substitution is rarer than that for [z], and in fact in many Hindi and Punjabi words /f/ is used by native speakers instead of /pʰ/, or the two are used interchangeably.
- Some speakers of Indian English, unless consciously, do not use the voiced postalveolar fricative (/ʒ/). Some Indians use /z/ (especially by Hindi and Punjabi speakers) or /dʒ/ (basically by most of the Indians, who do not even have [z] phoneme) instead, e.g. ⟨treasure⟩ /ˈtrɛzəːr/, and in some south Indian variants, with /ʃ/ as in ⟨shore⟩, e.g. ⟨treasure⟩ /ˈtrɛʃər/.

=== Spelling pronunciation ===
A number of distinctive features of Indian English are due to "the vagaries of English spelling". Most Indian languages, unlike English, have a nearly phonetic spelling, so the spelling of a word is a highly reliable guide to its modern pronunciation. Indians' tendency to pronounce English phonetically as well can cause divergence from British English. This phenomenon is known as spelling pronunciation.

- In words where the digraph ⟨gh⟩ represents a voiced velar plosive (/ɡ/) in other accents, some Indian English speakers supply a murmured version [ɡʱ], for example ⟨ghost⟩ [ɡʱoːst]. No other accent of English admits this voiced aspiration.
- Similarly, especially with Hindi speakers, the digraph ⟨wh⟩ may be aspirated as [ʋʱ] or [wʱ], resulting in realisations such as ⟨which⟩ [ʋʱɪtʃ], found in no other English accent (although some Scottish accents come close). This is somewhat similar to the traditional distinction between ⟨wh⟩ and ⟨w⟩ present in English, however, wherein the former is /ʍ/, whilst the latter is /w/.
- In unstressed syllables, which speakers of American English would realise as a schwa, speakers of Indian English would use the spelling vowel, making ⟨sanity⟩ sound as [ˈsæniti] instead of [ˈsænəti]. This trait is also present in other South Asian dialects (Pakistani and Sri Lankan English), and common for many second-language European speakers of English.
- The word "of" is usually pronounced with a /f/ instead of a /v/ as in most other accents.
- Use of [d] instead of [t] for the "-ed" ending of the past tense after voiceless consonants, for example "developed" may be [ˈdɛʋləpd] instead of RP /dɪˈvɛləpt/.
- Use of [s] instead of [z] for the ⟨-s⟩ ending of the plural after voiced consonants, for example ⟨dogs⟩ may be [daɡs] instead of [dɒɡz].
- Pronunciation of ⟨house⟩ as [haʊz] in both the noun and the verb, instead of [haʊs] as a noun and [haʊz] as a verb.
- Silent letters may be pronounced. For example, 'salmon' is usually pronounced with a distinct /l/.

=== Supra-segmental features ===
English is a stress-timed language. Both syllable stress and word stress (where only certain words in a sentence or phrase are stressed) are important features of Received Pronunciation. Indian native languages are actually syllable-timed languages, like French. Indian-English speakers usually speak with a syllabic rhythm. Further, in some Indian languages, stress is associated with a low pitch, whereas in most English dialects, stressed syllables are generally pronounced with a higher pitch. Thus, when some Indian speakers speak, they appear to put the stress accents at the wrong syllables, or accentuate all the syllables of a long English word. Certain Indian accents possess a "sing-song" quality, a feature seen in a few English dialects of Britain, such as Scouse and Welsh English.

== Numbering system ==
The Indian numbering system is preferred for digit grouping. When written in words, or when spoken, numbers less than 100,000 are expressed just as they are in Standard English. Numbers including and beyond 100,000 are expressed in a subset of the Indian numbering system. Thus, the following scale is used:

In digits (International system)	In digits (Indian system)	In words (short scales)	In words (Indian system)
10		ten	
100		one hundred	
1,000		one thousand	
10,000		ten thousand	
100,000	1,00,000	one hundred thousand	one lakh (from lākh लाख)
1,000,000	10,00,000	one million	ten lakh
10,000,000	1,00,00,000	ten million	one crore (from karoṛ करोड़)
100,000,000	10,00,00,000	one hundred million	ten crore
1,000,000,000	1,00,00,00,000	one billion	one hundred crore one arab (from arab अरब)
10,000,000,000	10,00,00,00,000	ten billion	one thousand crore ten arab
100,000,000,000	1,00,00,00,00,000	one hundred billion	ten thousand crore one kharab (from kharab खरब) (arab and kharab are not commonly used today)

Larger numbers are generally expressed as multiples of the above (for example, one lakh crores for one trillion).

== Vocabulary ==
Indian English includes many political, sociological, and administrative terms, such as dharna, hartal, eve-teasing, vote bank, swaraj, swadeshi, scheduled caste, scheduled tribe, and NRI. It incorporates some Anglo-Indian words such as tiffin, hill station, gymkhana, along with slang.

Indian English, like some other World Englishes, is notable for its treatment of English mass and count nouns. Words that are treated as mass nouns in native forms of English, such as evidence, equipment, or training, are frequently treated as count nouns in Indian English.

Some examples of words and phrases unique to, or chiefly used in, standard written Indian English include:

- ayye, aiye (interjection) (South India): ew.
- ayyo, aiyo (interjection) (South India): oh no, yikes.
- brinjal (noun): An eggplant/aubergine
- bus stand (noun): A bus station (British English)
- chain-snatching (verb): To snatch a gold chain (or sometimes silver chain) from someone and run away, usually perpetrated by two or more criminals on a motorbike/moped/scooter.
  - e.g. "Women are avoiding wearing gold chains due to the concerning rise in number of chain-snatching cases in many parts of the city."
- cinema (noun): A movie or film
- cinema hall (noun): A cinema or movie theatre
  - e.g. "Cinema halls in Uttar Pradesh will soon display the newly-unveiled logo for Kumbh Mela, right after the national anthem is played" (The Times of India, 3 January 2018)
- communalism: The creation of hatred between different religions and ethnicities which cause communal violence between them. The term is usually used to describe the hatred spread by religious leaders and politicians which cause Hindu–Muslim riots.
- desi: South Asian, Indian.
- do the needful: To do that which is necessary or required, with the respectful implication that the other party is trusted to understand what needs doing without being given detailed instructions.
  - e.g. "When asked if the UP government could reduce Value Added Tax (VAT) on petro-products to bring down prices, the CM said that the state government was aware of the situation and will do the needful." (2018 The Pioneer)
- English-knowing (adjective): Of a person or group of people that uses or speaks English.
  - e.g. "The official and Service atmosphere ... set the tone for almost all Indian middle-class life, especially the English-knowing intelligentsia." (Toward Freedom vii. 40, J. Nehru, 1941)
- foreign-returned (adjective): Of a person or group of people who has returned home after living abroad for a while
- freeship (noun): A studentship or scholarship.
  - e.g. "Two permanent freeships, each tenable for one year and one of which is for the second and the other for the third year class." (The Medical Reporter (Calcutta) 57/1, 1 February 1893)
  - e.g. "Private institutions can only develop if they are allowed to charge reasonable fees, while also providing need based freeships and scholarships for a certain percentage of students." (The Economic Times (Nexis), 12 October 2006)
- hartal (noun): A strike, protest.
- hotel (noun): A restaurant or café.
  - e.g. "A group of four friends had gone to have dinner at a roadside hotel." (Statesman (Calcutta), 10 February 1999 (Midweek section) 4/3)
- is it so: Oh really?
- it will be: This is how much it is (quantifying something).
  - e.g. Q: "How much is this?" A: "It will be two hundred and seventy rupees."
- kindly adjust: Used to acknowledge and apologise for something that causes problems or difficulties and ask people to accept and adapt to the situation, or used to apologise for causing inconvenience.
  - e.g. "The store will be closed this afternoon due to staffing shortages. Kindly adjust."
  - e.g.: When asking someone to move along so you can sit down. "I would like to sit down, sir. Kindly adjust."
- matrimonial (noun): Advertisements in a newspaper for the purpose of finding a marriageable partner.
  - e.g. "When I have a job I'll have to begin a whole new search for my better half ... Back to the newspaper matrimonials on Sundays." (Statesman (Calcutta), 10 February 1999 (Midweek section) 4/3)
- na (interjection) (North India): "isn't it?"
  - e.g. "That place is quite far na?"
- office boy: Usually a person employed to do less important and menial jobs in a business office (such as a messenger, copier maintenance, Chaiwala, etc.). Often resides or spends their working time in a special service space in the office, behind the front desk or in the pantry.
- out of station: used for saying that someone is away. This phrase has its origins in the posting of army officers to particular "stations" during the days of the East India Company.
- pass(ing) out (phrase): Graduate from school/college or complete a course at an institution.
  - e.g. "I passed out of college in 2007."
  - e.g. "I passed out of my school aged 17."
- petrol pump / petrol bunk (used in some parts of south India; noun): A petrol station (British English), gas station (American English)
- prepone (verb): To bring (something) forward to an earlier date or time.
  - e.g. "The meeting has been preponed due to a change in the schedule."
- pressperson (noun, frequently as a single word): A newspaper journalist, a reporter, a member of the press.
  - e.g. "The Prime Minister greeted the presspersons with a 'namaskar' [customary Hindu greeting] and a broad smile." (The Hindu (Nexis), 20 June 2001)
- ragging (noun): bullying, fagging
- redressal (noun): Redress
  - e.g. "There is an urgent need for setting up an independent authority for redressal of telecom consumer complaints." (Statesman (India) (Nexis), 2 April 1998)
  - e.g. "Where does he go for the redressal of his genuine grievances?" (Sunday Times of India, 15 September 2002 8/4)
- revert (verb): To report back with information.
  - e.g. "Please revert with the required documentation."
- road junction/circle (noun): a crossroad (British English), intersection (American English)
- tiffin: lunch, snack.
- updation: The act of updating.
- upgradation (noun): The enhancement or upgrading of status, value or level of something.
  - e.g. "Our Company lays great stress on technical training and knowledge upgradation." (Business India, 8 September 1986 153/1 (advert))
- votebank: A bloc of voters from a single community or a group of communities who always back a certain candidate or political party for bribes and/or employment favours given by the particular party.

== Spelling ==
Spelling practices in Indian English generally follow the British style, e.g., using travelling, litre, practise (as a verb), anaesthesia, fulfil, catalogue, realise and colour, rather than the American style.

== Dictionaries ==
The most famous dictionary of Indian English is Yule and Brunell's Hobson-Jobson, originally published in 1886 with an expanded edition edited by William Crooke in 1903, widely available in reprint since the 1960s.

Numerous other dictionaries ostensibly covering Indian English, though for the most part being merely collections of administratively-useful words from local languages, include (chronologically): Rousseau A Dictionary of Words used in the East Indies (1804), Wilkins Glossary to the Fifth Report (1813), Stocqueler The Oriental Interpreter and Treasury of East Indian Knowledge (1844), Elliot A Supplement to the Glossary of Indian Terms: A–J (1845), Brown The Zillah Dictionary in the Roman Character (1852), Carnegy Kutcherry Technicalities (1853) and its second edition Kachahri Technicalities (1877), Wilson Glossary of Judicial and Revenue Terms (1855), Giles A Glossary of Reference, on Subjects connected with the Far East (1878), Whitworth Anglo-Indian Dictionary (1885), Temple A Glossary of Indian Terms relating to Religion, Customs, Government, Land (1897), and Crooke Things India: Being Discursive Notes on Various Subjects connected with India (1906).

The first dictionary of Indian English to be published after independence was Hawkins Common Indian Words in English (1984). Other efforts include (chronologically): Lewis Sahibs, Nabobs and Boxwallahs (1991), Muthiah Words in Indian English (1991), Sengupta's Indian English supplement to the Oxford Advanced Learner's Dictionary (1996) and Hankin Hanklyn-Janklin (2003). Nihalani et al. Indian and British English: A Handbook of Usage and Pronunciation (2004) delineates how Indian English differs from British English for a large number of specific lexical items. The Macmillan publishing company also produced a range of synchronic general dictionaries for the Indian market, such as the Macmillan Comprehensive Dictionary (2006).

The most recent dictionary is Carls A Dictionary of Indian English, with a Supplement on Word-formation Patterns (2017).

== See also ==
- Regional differences and dialects in Indian English
- Indian English literature
- Indian numbering system
- Languages with official status in India
- Indian States by most popular languages
- Kanglish
- Hinglish
- Manglish
- Malaysian English
- Pakistani English/Paklish
- Bangladeshi English/Banglish
- Tanglish
- Tenglish
- Commonwealth English
- English as a lingua franca
- Regional accents of English
