= List of surveys in India =

Surveys in India

With the establishment of Survey of India by the East India Company in 1767, commenced the first modern scientific survey in India. This is the list of surveys conducted in India.

== Government organisations ==
Name	Established	Ministry	Reference
Survey of India	1767	Ministry of Science and Technology	
Geological Survey of India	1851	Ministry of Mines	
Archaeological Survey of India	1861	Ministry of Culture	
Botanical Survey of India	1890	Ministry of Environment, Forest and Climate Change	
Zoological Survey of India	1916	Ministry of Environment, Forest and Climate Change	
Anthropological Survey of India	1945	Ministry of Culture	
Forest Survey of India	1981	Ministry of Environment, Forest and Climate Change	
Fishery Survey of India	1985	Ministry of Agriculture and Farmers' Welfare	

== Other surveys ==
Name	Time period	Conductor
Great Trigonometrical Survey	1802 - 1806	East India Company
Linguistic Survey of India	1894 - 1928	British Raj
Economic Survey of India	1950 - present	Ministry of Finance
National Family Health Survey	1992 - present	Ministry of Health and Family Welfare
National Achievement Survey	2001 - present	Ministry of Education
All India Survey of Higher Education	2010 - present	Ministry of Education
National Food Survey	1992 - 2007	IMRB International
India Human Development Survey	2005, 2012	University of Maryland
People's Linguistic Survey of India	2010 - 2012	Bhasha Research and Publication Centre

== See also ==
- National Archives of India
- India Meteorological Department
- India Post
- Indian Railways
- Reserve Bank of India
- Central Public Works Department
- Council of Scientific and Industrial Research
- Indian Science Congress Association
- The Asiatic Society
- United Service Institution
