= Kantar Group =

British market research company

Kantar Group Ltd.
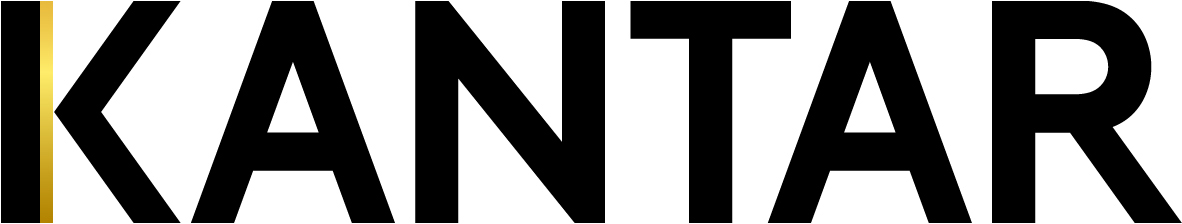
- Type: Private Limited Company
- Industry: Market research
- Founded: 1992 (as the Market Research, Insight and Consultancy division of WPP)
- Headquarters: London, England, UK
- Key people: Paul Zwillenberg (CEO)
- Products: Market research Data investment Management consultancy
- Owner: Bain Capital (60%); WPP Group (40%)
- Website: www.kantar.com

Kantar Group Ltd. is an international market research company based in London, England. It was founded in 1992, and has approximately 20,000 employees across over 90 countries working in various research disciplines, including brand guidance, brand strategy, social media monitoring, advertising effectiveness, consumer and shopper behaviour, design strategy and public opinion.

Kantar's majority is owned by Bain Capital Private Equity since July 2019, when WPP sold a 60% stake of the company for $3.1 billion, at a valuation of $4.0 billion.

== History ==
=== Leadership ===
On 24 October 2018 it was announced that the WPP board approved the plans to sell Kantar Group.

On December 2019, Eric Salama stepped down as the CEO of Kantar Group. Eric Salama had been with Kantar since it was bought by WPP in 1988.

In January 2020, Ian Griffiths (former CFO and COO at ITV) was named Chief Financial Officer of Kantar, while Adam Crozier was appointed chairman.

In October 2020, Kantar announced the appointment of Alexis Nasard as chief executive officer, effective 30 December 2020. Nasard subsequently stepped down as CEO of Kantar on 27 April 2021.

In July 2021, Chris Jansen was appointed to replace Alexis Nasard as CEO, effective 1 November 2021.

Paul Zwillenberg took over the role of CEO from Chris Jansen effective 1 January 2026.

== Operations ==
Kantar has offices in 90 markets, including the UK & Ireland, North America, India, Spain, France, Italy, China and Brazil. Their global headquarters are in London. In April 2019, Kantar unified all its legacy brands, such as Kantar TNS, Kantar Millward Brown, Kantar Media, and Kantar Worldpanel.

=== Kantar Insights ===
By 2019, Kantar merged the operations of IMRB, Millward Brown and TNS, and Kantar's parent company WPP merged its media and advertising subsidiary GroupM with Kantar to form a global Insights division. Following similar exercises across the globe, Kantar reduced the sub brands from 18 to 9 by 2019.

=== Kantar Profiles ===
Kantar Profiles (formerly Lightspeed) was founded in 2000 and is headquartered in Warren, New Jersey, United States. It provides online market research services, specializing in using the Internet as a data collection platform to provide research through building and maintaining panels subject to quality and representative sampling standards.

Specialty panels range across industry sectors such as financial services, health care, business-to-business, automotive, family and more. Kantar Profiles also provides custom panels to address specific client needs. In 2007, it conducted over 20 million online surveys for clients.

In 2019, Kantar brought its global panels and sample offer together into a new respondent network, Kantar Profiles Network. In 2023 as a part of its Health assets sale to M3 Global Research, Kantar also sold Kantar Profiles –Health division.

== Former brands ==
=== Kantar IMRB ===
Kantar IMRB (formerly "IMRB International" and "Indian Market Research Bureau") is a multi-country market research, survey and business consultancy firm established in 1970 that offers a range of syndicated data and customized research services. With over 1200 employees, IMRB is one of the largest providers of market research in India in an industry estimated to be worth a minimum of $187 million. As the oldest extant market research company in India, IMRB has been responsible for establishing the first and only household panel, the first television audience measurement system and the first radio panel in the country. IMRB International's specialized areas are consumer markets, industrial marketing, business-to-business marketing, social marketing and rural marketing.

=== Kantar Millward Brown ===
Millward Brown was founded in Leamington Spa, England in 1973 and acquired by WPP Group in 1990. In 2004, WPP backed Millward Brown acquired strategic marketing research and consulting firm, MaPS - Marketing and Planning Systems based at Boston In 2015, the experts from MaPS were moved to Millward Brown Analytics. Kantar Millward Brown, now part of Kantar's Insights Division, is a global research agency specialising in advertising, marketing communications, media and brand equity research. Kantar Millward Brown works across a range of industries and categories, and has a number of specialist practices.

=== Kantar TNS ===
In 2008, Kantar TNS (Taylor Nelson Sofres) was acquired by WPP and included in Kantar. In February 2009, Kantar merged TNS and Research International.

=== Kantar Added Value ===
In October 2004, three Kantar companies – Added Value, Icon Brand Navigation and Diagnostic Research – combined under the "Added Value" name. Kantar Added Value focused on brand marketing, consumer insight, innovation and communications optimisation.

=== Kantar Futures ===
Kantar Futures offered subscription services and consulting regarding future trends. Formerly known as The Futures Company, Kantar Futures was formed through the integration of The Henley Centre, HeadlightVision, Yankelovich and TRU.

=== Kantar Vermeer ===
In 2014, Millward Brown acquired EffectiveBrands Holding B.V., a marketing strategy consulting firm headquartered in Amsterdam. Millward Brown merged EffectiveBrands with Millward Brown Optimor, its strategy consulting unit, to form Millward Brown Vermeer.

=== Kantar Health ===
Kantar Health (now Kantar's Health Division) provides data, analytics, and market research to the life sciences industry. As of December 2020, Cerner announced that it will acquire Kantar Health, acquisition is expected to close in the first half of 2021. On 1 April 2021 Cerner completed the acquisition of Kantar's Health Division and has re-branded to Cerner Enviza.

=== Kantar Public ===
Kantar Public conducts research and evaluations and advises governments, the public sector, NGOs and NFPs on the delivery of public policy, programmes, services and communications to the public. In May 2022, Kantar announced the sale of Kantar Public businesses to private equity firm Trilantic Europe. From 9 November 2023, Kantar Public became known as Verian.

=== Worldpanel by Numerator ===
Kantar Worldpanel (formerly TNS Worldpanel) runs continuous consumer panels and specializes in shopper behavior. The Worldpanel division measures and advises on consumer and shopper behaviour, offering insight-based consulting on clients' marketing and business strategies. In January 2025, Numerator, a data and tech company serving the North American market research space, combined with Kantar's Worldpanel division to form a new global consumer data company. Eric Belcher, current CEO of Numerator, leads the new combined organization.

=== Kantar Media ===
Kantar Media analyzes print, radio, TV, internet, cinema, mobile, social, and outdoor media. Kantar Media was formed from WPP Group's acquisition of TNS Media and KMR Group in 2010. In 2014, Kantar Media acquired a majority stake in the issued share capital of Precise Media Group in a £70 Million deal. In the same year, Kantar Media acquired IBOPE Media, the main TV audience and ad investment measurement company in Brazil. Kantar Media has within it organizational subsidiaries, such as Kantar Media North America, which are legal corporate entities in their own right.

In January 2022, Symphony Technology Group acquired Kantar Reputation Intelligence, a media monitoring and analysis subsidiary of Kantar. The deal was finalized on 31 December 2021, and the merged company will operate under the name Onclusive.

In October 2022, Kantar reorganized to create a combined Creative & Media Solutions and appointed Steven Silvers to lead the newly created division.

In June 2023, Kantar sold its Media Healthcare Research (KMHR) to M3 Global Research.

In August 2025, Kantar completed the sale of Kantar Media business to H.I.G. Capital ("H.I.G."). From 25 February 2026 Kantar Media became known as Fifty5Blue

== Acquisitions ==
British Market Research Bureau Limited – BMRB, which was established in 1933, London, was acquired by the group in 2009 and merged into Kantar Public in 2016. The subsidiary TGI – Target Group Index of BMRB, which was established in 1969, was split and merged into the Kantar Media brand in 2009.

In December 2019, the Kantar Group acquired the market research company Colmar Brunton Australia as part of its acquisition of WPPAUNZ's Data Investment Management division. In February 2020, Colmar Brunton in Australia was fully integrated into Kantar, with the Colmar Brunton brand being retired in Australia. The following year, Kantar acquired Colmar Brunton's New Zealand parent company.

In July 2021, Kantar completed the acquisition of U.S. based Numerator (valued at $1.5 Billion) from Vista Equity Partners, aiming to strengthen its Worldpanel and Advertising Intelligence divisions with US and Canada in focus. The terms of deal were not disclosed.

In January 2022, Kantar announced it had acquired MindIT, a spin-out from the University of Bologna that specializes in machine-learning algorithms and AI.

In April 2022, Kantar announced it had acquired the Copenhagen-based marketing measurement and optimization company, Blackwood Seven.

In May 2022, Kantar announced it had acquired Qmee. In August 2022, Kantar announced the acquisition of StepUp RGM to strengthen its existing XTEL division, revenue management solutions provider.

In January 2023, Kantar announced the acquisition of Kauza to augment its Worldpanel in the Nordics.

== Subsidiaries ==
=== Vivvix ===
In January 2023, Kantar Group announced the creation of a new group company, Vivvix by unifying the advertising intelligence businesses of Kantar and Numerator. The independent company was led by former Nielsen CRO Andrew Feigenson as CEO.

In November 2023, Vivvix was acquired by ad sales intelligence firm MediaRadar led by CEO Todd Krizelman.
