= Regional differences and dialects in Indian English =

Variation in the English language spoken in India

Indian English has developed a number of dialects, distinct from the General/Standard Indian English that educators have attempted to establish and institutionalise, and it is possible to distinguish a person's sociolinguistic background from the dialect that they employ. These dialects are influenced by the different languages that different sections of the country also speak, side by side with English. The dialects can differ markedly in their phonology, to the point that two speakers using two different dialects can find each other's accents mutually unintelligible.

Indian English is a "network of varieties", resulting from an extraordinarily complex linguistic situation in the country. (See Official languages of India.) This network comprises both regional and occupational dialects of English. The widely recognised dialects include Tamil English, Malayali English, Telugu English, Maharashtrian English, Punjabi English, Bengali English, Hindi English, alongside several more obscure dialects such as Butler English (a.k.a. Bearer English), Babu English, and Bazaar English and several code-mixed varieties of English.

The formation of these regional/socio-economic dialects is the same form of language contact that has given rise to Scottish English.

== General Indian English ==
General Indian English here refers to a variety originating outside of the eastern regions and southern regions, crossing regional boundaries throughout the Republic of India. As mentioned, Cultivated Indian English is almost entirely this General Indian dialect but with a few additional features derived from Received Pronunciation.

This accent is closest to the educated people, used by news anchors, actors and upper-class people throughout the nation not just particular to any region.

== Babu English ==
Babu English (a.k.a. Baboo English), the name originally coming from the Bengali word for a gentleman, is a dialect of English that first developed as an occupational dialect, amongst clerks in the Bengali-speaking areas of pre-Partition India. Originally characterised as a markedly ornate form of administrative English, it is now no longer confined solely to clerks, and can be found in Nepal, north India, and in some social circles in south India.

The distinguishing characteristics of Babu English are the florid, excessively polite, and indirect manner of expression, which have been reported for amusement value, in works such as Cecil Hunt's Honoured Sir collections (see Further reading), and lampooned, in works such as F. Antesey's Baboo Jabberjee, B.A., for over a century.

== Butler English ==
Butler English, also known as Bearer English or Kitchen English, is a dialect of English that first developed as an occupational dialect in the years of the Madras Presidency, but that has developed over time and is now associated mainly with social class rather than occupation. It is still spoken in major metropolitan cities.

The dialect of Butler English is singular. Therefore, the present participle is used for the future indicative, and the preterite. For example, for the preterite indicative "done", "I telling" translates to "I will tell", "I done tell" to "I have told", and "done come" to "actually arrived". This form of Indian English was used both by masters for speaking to their servants as well as by servants to speak to their masters.

== Hindi English ==
Hinglish (the name is a combination of the words "Hindi" and "English") is a macaronic language, a hybrid of British English and South Asian languages – it is a code-switching variety of these languages whereby they are freely interchanged within a sentence or between sentences. While the name is based on the Hindi language, it does not refer exclusively to Hindi, but "is used in India, with English words blending with Punjabi, and Hindi, and also within British Asian families to enliven standard English." It is predominantly spoken in Northern India and some parts of Mumbai and Bangalore.

Modern phonologists often divide Indian English into five major varieties.

== Assamese English ==
Assamese English refers to the English spoken by Assamese speakers. Some major difference between Assamese English and British English are mostly seen in some consonants. In Assamese English all vowels are usually short.

Words	Pronunciation in Assamese English
apple	ɛpʊl
cold	kol(d)
ball	bɔl
cool	kul
mango	mɛŋɡɔ
father	ɸadaɹ
cat	kɛt
she	si
China	saɪna
verification	bʱɛɹiɸikɛsɔn
intelligent	intɛlizɛn
telephone	telɪɸʊn
jewellery	zʊɛlaɹi
think	tʰiŋ
desk	dɛks
road	ɹʊd, ɹod
guardian	ɡaɹzɛn
fish	ɸis, pʰis
but	bat
number	nambaɹ
university	iʊnibʱaɹsiti
ghost	ɡʱos(t)
college	kɔlɛz
pressure	p(ɹ)saɹ
torch	tɔ(ɹ)s
checkpoint	sɛkpɔɪn
halfpant	ɦappɛn

== Bengali English ==
Bengali English (or eastern Indian English) here refers collectively to the varieties of the West Bengal state and neighbouring country of Bangladesh, which has been greatly influenced by Bengali. Its main subdivisions are Calcutta English as well as Dhaka English. It is similar or even identical to Bangladeshi English, also known as Banglish or Benglish.

- /ɪ/ as raised, in the general vicinity of [i].
- /ʌ/ as fronted, more closely approaching [a] but [ɔ] between nasal and velar e.g. mug.
- /ʊ/ and /uː/ both in the general vicinity of [u].
- /eɪ/, almost always, as monophthong [e].
- /oʊ/, almost always, as monophthong [o].
- /f/ as [ɸ].
- /v/ as [β].

== West Indian English ==
West Indian English here refers to a traditional variety spoken in the western part of India.

- /oʊ/ as monophthongal [oː].
- /eɪ/ as monophthongal [eː].
- /ɛ/ as [e].
- /æ/ as [ɛ].
- /θ/ and /ð/, respectively, as [t̪(ʰ)] and [d̪(ʱ)].

== Cultivated Indian English ==
Cultivated Indian English here refers collectively to non-localised, non-working class, and more recent varieties of India and the surrounding region of India. It includes mainstream Indian English, a widely common, upper-class variety that preserves a few local Indian features while setting the basis for an otherwise General Indian English accent as well as new Cultivated Indian English, a youthful variety beginning in the 2000s. However, both are found rarely in India.

== Southern Indian English ==
Southern Indian English here refers to broad varieties of Southern India.

- /oʊ/ as monophthongal [oː].
- /eɪ/ as monophthongal [eː].
- /ɒ/ as [ɑ]
- /θ/ and /ð/, respectively, as [t̪(ʰ)] and [d̪(ʱ)].

In addition to these, the alveolar stops [t] and [d] in words like water and door are often pronounced as their retroflex equivalents [ʈ] and [ɖ] respectively.

- Words spelt with double consonants may have the consonant geminated; e.g., summer, happy, killing, bitter [sʌmmə hæːppi killiŋɡ biʈʈə~bittə]. Not generally done if the surrounding vowels are long unless it's an affixed word; e.g., irrespective [irrispekʈiʋ]. The "dg" clusters, as in "judge", and "edge", are also geminated.

An epenthetic y might be added to words starting with a front vowel and a w to words starting with a rounded vowel. Hypercorrection is also common, e.g., the letter "s" as "yes" and "yes" as "es".

Tamil and Malayali speakers might voice the intervocalic and post-nasal plosives or double them, e.g., "simply" [simbɭi].

=== Malayali ===
- An epenthetic vowel [ə̆] maybe added to words ending with some consonants.
- /eɪ/ can be [ei̯, eji, aji] along with [eː], e.g. name, jail [neim~nejim, d͡ʒajil].
- /ɔː/ is [oː~ɔː] as in caught [kɔːʈ(ʈə̆)].
- /Cwɪ, Cwi:/ maybe pronounced as [Cju, Cju:], e.g. quiz, queen [kjus(sə̆), kju:n].
- Alveolar [t, nd, n, l] are used for /t, {nd, nt}, n, l/ after front vowels and their retroflex versions after other vowels, e.g. seat, suit, kind, count, peel, pool [siːt(tə̆), suːʈ(ʈə̆), kai̯nd(ə̆), kau̯ɳɖ(ə̆)~kau̯ɳʈ(ə̆), piːl, puːɭ]; plain [d] isn't there as Malayalam doesn't have it.
- /z/ is never taken as [d͡ʒ] as in rest of South Asia, its either s or z, e.g. zoo [suː~zuː]. /ʒ/ is mostly loaned as /ʃ/ (mostly ones spelt with 's') or as /dʒ, ɻ/, e.g., "genre" [ɻoːɳɐr].
- In rhotic accents /rs/ cluster is [ɻs] while other instances of /r/ can be [r] or [ɾ], e.g. register, registers, carrot, orange [ɾedʒistɐr, ɾedʒisteːɻs(ə̆), kaːɾɐtːə̆, oːrɐɲdʒə̆].

== See also ==
- Code-switching
- English language
- Hinglish
- Kanglish or Bangalorean English
- Manglish
- Interlanguage
- List of dialects of the English language
- Tanglish
- Tenglish
