= Conversion as a service =

In the e-commerce industry, conversion as a service is a method of online conversion optimization that is a customized intersection of art and technology that combines analytics, behavioral targeting, software, style, and business rules to exact success. This approach advocates a holistic approach to achieve an improvement in online conversion.

== Benefits ==
Conversion as a Service (Caas) allows clients to take advantage of the accumulated expertise of a vendor, rather than either developing and maintaining the expertise in-house or outsourcing the expertise through a third-party services firm. Opting for vendor expertise ensures a knowledge base for the lifetime of the relationship and real-time program optimization.

CRO is a process of improving the performance of a website using user feedback and visitor analytics. There are some metrics on a website which a person wants to improve, normally called as key performance indicators. These factors can be improved via CRO. Most of the time these metrics are associated with acquisition of new customers, downloads, sign up’s etc. In short, it is a process of improving the percentage of passive visitors into valuable consumers.

In the process of CRO, what visitors are searching and looking while they surf a site is found out and that information to provide to them. Depending on what metrics, a person wants to improve CRO may take varied forms. An example would be placing strong call to actions on a high traffic but under optimized page. In some cases, it refers to removal of unnecessary and complicated steps from the conversion funnel which hinder conversions.

== Characteristics ==
=== Pay-For-Performance Models ===
Performance measurement is key to Conversion as a Service. In pay-for-performance models, the success or failure of a solution is not based on whether providers successfully deploy software, but on whether or not the solution delivers desired measurable results. In this model, providers and clients align their efforts to meet a set of agreed-upon metrics that determine whether or not the relationship is valuable.

In most cases, the metrics used in e-commerce revolve around gains in incremental revenue directly attributable to a solution provider. The specific metric can vary, whether it is an increase in average order value, up-sell, or customer satisfaction or a decrease in cart abandonment or call center traffic, the solution provider must be able to demonstrate that an increase in revenue can be tied to the presence of their solution.

=== Goals ===
There are three goals for clarity in Pay-For-Performance Models:

Transparency
Pay-for-performance models require a level of transparency on the part of the vendor to share with clients both the process for collecting the data and for measuring the results. Also, the calculations should be kept simple and the ability to inspect the data readily available.

Alignment
Organizations often use metrics to define success for groups and individuals, to guide their activities, and to grade their performance. Similarly, vendors should be committed to meet the business objectives of an organization through goals. In most pay-for-performance models, vendors define the metrics by which they will be graded. While this model forces vendors to perform, it does not guarantee that success will directly align with business needs. The models result from negotiations between vendors and clients to define the metrics and describe success.

Value
The goal of most online business is to generate revenue. If the system for measurement is transparent and the vendor goals are aligned with client objectives, then the amount of incremental revenue generated by a vendor becomes the final metric for success.

== See also ==
- Web audience measurement
