= Danchi babu =

Danchi babu or Damchi babu (Bengali: ড্যাঞ্চিবাবু) was the term used by the locals in present-day Jharkhand to refer to the middle class Bengali Hindu travellers in a queer and funny manner. The term 'Danchi' is a corrupt form of the English words 'damn cheap' and 'babu' stood for the affluent Bengali Hindu gentleman belonging the bhadralok class.

== Origins ==
In the 19th and the 20th centuries, especially during the British period, middle class Bengali Hindus from Kolkata used to vacation in the small towns like Simulata, Madhupur, Jasidih→ etc. of present-day Jharkhand for health benefits. In 1871, one Bijoynarayan Kundu, a Bengali Hindu came to the region while the railway track between Giridih and Madhupur was being laid. He is said to be the first Bengali Hindu to discover the salubrious climate of the region, who constructed a house and settled down there. Gradually the word spread and many Bengali Hindus began to come to the region for vacation. They considered the trip as a welcome change compared to the city life of Kolkata, and hence came to be known as 'changers'. The vacationers widely believed that the weather and water in those areas was conducive for good health. The vacation became an annual affair followed with religious sincerity.

During the vacation, the vacationers would often visit the local grocery markets, where the locals sold their fresh produce of meat, fish and vegetables. The prices were low compared to that in Kolkata. Surprised at the unusually low prices, the Bengali Hindu bhadraloks would often exclaim at each other saying 'Damn cheap!' or 'Damned cheap!'. The locals, who couldn't understand properly what the vacationers pronounced or meant, began referring to the vacationers as "'Damn cheap' babus", which gradually got corrupted into 'Danchi babu'.

== See also ==
- Bong
- Ching Chong
- Hottentot
