= Tenglish =

Mixing of the Telugu and English languages

Tenglish (Telugu: తెంగ్లిష్ (teṅgliṣ)), refers to the code-mixing or code-switching of the Telugu language and Indian English.

The name is a portmanteau of the names of the two languages and has been variously composed. The earliest form is Telugish (dating from 1972), then Teluglish (2000), Tinglish (2003), Telenglish (2010), and Telugish and Telish (both 2014).

In the context of colloquial written language, Tenglish refers to the Telugu language written in English alphabet (that is, using Roman script instead of Telugu script, in contexts like social media), mixed with English vocabulary as well.

== Distribution ==
This form of code-switching is more commonly seen in urban and suburban centers of Andhra Pradesh and Telangana, but is slowly spreading into rural and remote areas via television and word of mouth. Many speakers do not realize that they are incorporating English words into Telugu sentences or Telugu words into English sentences. For example, instead of saying dhanyavadhamulu for "thank you", most people say chala thanks; literally translating to "a lot of thanks." This type of Telugu speaking is slowly growing outside of cities like Hyderabad, Vizag, Vijayawada, Khammam, Guntur and Warangal. As English becomes more and more prevalent, it can be seen in small towns, villages, and even rural areas.

With its growing popularity, Tenglish is being used to publish news online. The advent of cable television and its pervasive growth has seen the masses exposed to a wide variety of programming from across the world. Another factor contributing to the spread of Tenglish is the popularity of Tollywood films and TV channels. Tenglish also appears in Indian crossword puzzles, such as those in the Telugu paper Sakshi.

== See also ==
- Hinglish
- Tanglish
- Indian English
- Regional differences and dialects in Indian English
