= IMRB International =

KANTAR IMRB
- Company type: Subsidiary
- Founded: 1970
- Founder: Hindustan Thompson Associates
- Headquarters: Mumbai, Maharashtra, India
- Services: Research, business consulting and survey
- Number of employees: 1200
- Parent: Kantar Group

Kantar IMRB is a market research, survey and business consultancy firm. It is headquartered in Mumbai, India and has operations in over 15 countries. IMRB is a part of the Kantar Group, WPP’s research, insights, and consultancy network.

Established in 1970, Kantar IMRB was modeled on the lines of the British Market Research Bureau. IMRB provides market research and insights across South Asia, the Middle East and North Africa with specialist divisions in quantitative, qualitative, media, retail, industrial, customer satisfaction, business to business and social and rural research. KANTAR IMRB’s syndicated research offerings include the MarketPulse, the National Food Survey, Web Audience Measurement (WAM), ITops, and I-Cube reports.

With over 1200 employees, Kantar IMRB is one of the largest providers of market research in India in an industry estimated to be worth a minimum of $187 million. As the oldest extant market research company in India, Kantar IMRB has been responsible for establishing the first and only household panel, the first television audience measurement system and the first radio panel in the country and has played a key role in the development of market research in India. It has been rated the 'Best Market Research Company' by industry body Market Research Society of India (MRSI) for several years.

Kantar IMRB's specialised areas are consumer markets, industrial marketing, business to business marketing, social marketing, and rural marketing.

== History ==
Kantar IMRB was established in 1971 (official start date 15 March 1971), to provide market research services to the clients of Hindustan Thompson Associates, although work was going on from an earlier date (as early as 1967). Early clients included fast-moving consumer goods companies such as Unilever, ITC, Pond’s, and Horlicks. The initial decade saw rapid expansion into new areas of business, with the first qualitative study being conducted by the end of the decade, and IMRB pioneering psephology in India through an ongoing series of opinion poll surveys for India Today, that successfully predicted Congress’ victory in the 1980 general election.

Subsequent decades saw the development of new verticals, with the creation of specialized units and the offering of several syndicated research products. IMRB also played an important role in the standardization of market research practice in India, and was responsible for the creation in 1983 of the Socio-Economic Classification system, a method now used across India to define target audiences. In 1987, as a founder member of the MRSI, it helped evolve industry wide codes of conduct, and standards for survey data collection that are still in use today.

With the global acquisition of J. Walter Thompson by Sir Martin Sorrell in 1987, IMRB became a constituent of WPP and continued its pace of growth, growing over 25% per annum through the 1990s under the leadership of Ramesh Thadani. The 1990s saw the creation of specialized units focusing on development research, employee satisfaction, loyalty programs, technology and media and the acquisition of several new multinational clients. IMRB's insights also played a role in the development of several new products for major Indian brands such as Marico, Bingo Chips, Godrej and Dabur and by this time supported 40 out of top 50 brands in India. In 2002, as part of a process of rebranding, it changed its name from the Indian Market Research Bureau to IMRB International, adopted a new logo, and began a process of rapidly expanding its international services. This was accompanied by a shift from its offices at Esplanade Mansion to its current premises in Dadar, Mumbai. As part of geographical expansion, IMRB helped set up LMRB in Colombo, Sri Lanka in 1981 and AMRB in 1999 with headquarters in Dubai and offices throughout the Middle East and North Africa.

In 1996, along with the Manufacturers’ Association for Information Technology (MAIT) IMRB initiated the periodic ITOPS survey which monitors the IT hardware market among households and businesses. Since 1998, in collaboration with the Internet and Mobile Association of India (IAMAI), an industry body IMRB also started providing a series of annual syndicated research reports named I-Cube which surveys the online and mobile landscape in India. More recently, in 2010 IMRB launched the Web Audience Measurement (WAM) system, India’s first standardized internet audience measurement system based on a panel.

== Company structure ==
IMRB is headquartered in Mumbai, India. Its parent company is Hindustan Thompson Associates, which in turn is owned by Martin Sorrell's WPP Group plc. Within WPP, IMRB is aligned with the Kantar Group, an umbrella network of global market research companies that together account for over $2 billion in revenues and form the world’s second biggest market research conglomerate.

A diagrammatic chart representing IMRB's ownership structure.

In India, IMRB International operates out of its five full service offices in Ahmedabad, Mumbai, Delhi, Kolkata, Chennai and Bangalore and is supported by 15 other regional centers for collection of survey information. Overseas, IMRB functions through its associates AMRB-MENA in the Middle East and North Africa, with offices in Algiers, Dubai, Jeddah, Casablanca and Cairo; and LMRB, with offices in Colombo and Sirius, headquartered in Dhaka.

IMRB is currently headed by Preeti Reddy. As the oldest market research company in India, it has served as the training ground of many industry leaders including Dorab Sopariwala, Ranjit Chib and Meena Kaushik, who went on to found their own companies.

=== Business divisions and services ===
IMRB is organized into several independent business divisions that focus on specific areas of market research. It currently has eight business units in addition to its oldest division, the quantitative research division.

Sign outside IMRB's Mumbai head office.

Name of Division	Year of Establishment	Areas of Expertise	Scope of Work
Quantitative Research Wing	1971	Quantitative custom and syndicated research, National Foods Survey	Responsible for a wide range of data analytics; Comprises the bulk of IMRB's custom research
Probe Qualitative Research	1979	Ethnographic, qualitative custom research	Integrates insights from anthropology, psychology and the social sciences
Media and Panel Group	1992	MarketPulse, TGI, custom media research	Tracks over 70,000 households purchase behavior; Conducts custom specialized media research
Business and Industrial Research Division	1994	ICube, ITops, WAM, B2B consulting	Runs WAM, India's Web Audience Measurement service; Brings out industry/ sector specific reports
Brand Science	1996	New tools that help understand brands, and communication in an Indian context	Provides brand and communications consulting and advisory services
Customer Satisfaction Management and Measurement	1994	Customer and Employee satisfaction surveys, Loyalty Programs	Focuses on stakeholder researcher-employees, vendors, shoppers; Tracks employee satisfaction and stakeholder loyalty levels
MindTech Systems	2001	Market research software, data fusion, CASS (computer aided survey systems)	Provides customized software and platforms for data collection and analysis; Provides software support for television audience measurement, and retail purchase data collection
Social and Rural Research Institute	1991	Developmental Research, Public Health Research, All India Health Survey	Primarily services aid agencies, NGOs, and the government; Responsible for the largest UNICEF Survey on polio, data collection for National Family Health Survey
Abacus Market Analytics	2001	Data processing, advanced analytics, market research software, survey programming	Handles operations in data processing, charting, statistical analysis, database management and updation, Excel Macro Creation and Quality Testing

In addition to its eight specialized units, IMRB also has Abacus field offices that are responsible for the recruitment, administration and quality control of survey responses.

While a significant amount of its work involves customized research such as usage studies, branding studies, public opinion research, concept testing, product testing, need assessment studies, packaging and label research, and market segmentation studies IMRB also offers a variety of syndicated research products and reports that are widely used as industry bench-marks of consumer behaviour, such as:

- MarketPulse, a continuous monthly tracking of household purchases across various FMCG categories. The panel covers over 70,000 homes with 56,000 homes in urban and 14,000 in rural India and is widely used as a benchmark for purchase and pricing behavior. Its counterpart the Elite Household Panel tracks information in affluent, urban households
- WAM and RAM, a standardized audience measurement system that samples web and radio audiences, and provides real time detailed segmented data on web usage behaviors
- ITops and ICube, syndicated annual research reports on the landscape of new technology in India
- TGI India, a collaboration with TGI, which provides marketing and media information covering data on consumer attitudes, motivations, media habits and purchasing behavior.

== See also ==
- Marketing Research
