= Murad Takla =

Bengali phrase

In Bangladeshi humour and popular culture, Murad Takla (Bengali: মুরাদ টাকলা) refers to someone who writes Bengali words using the Latin script in a bizarre or unorthodox fashion, inadvertently producing a distorted meaning. The phrase originated in the 2010s.

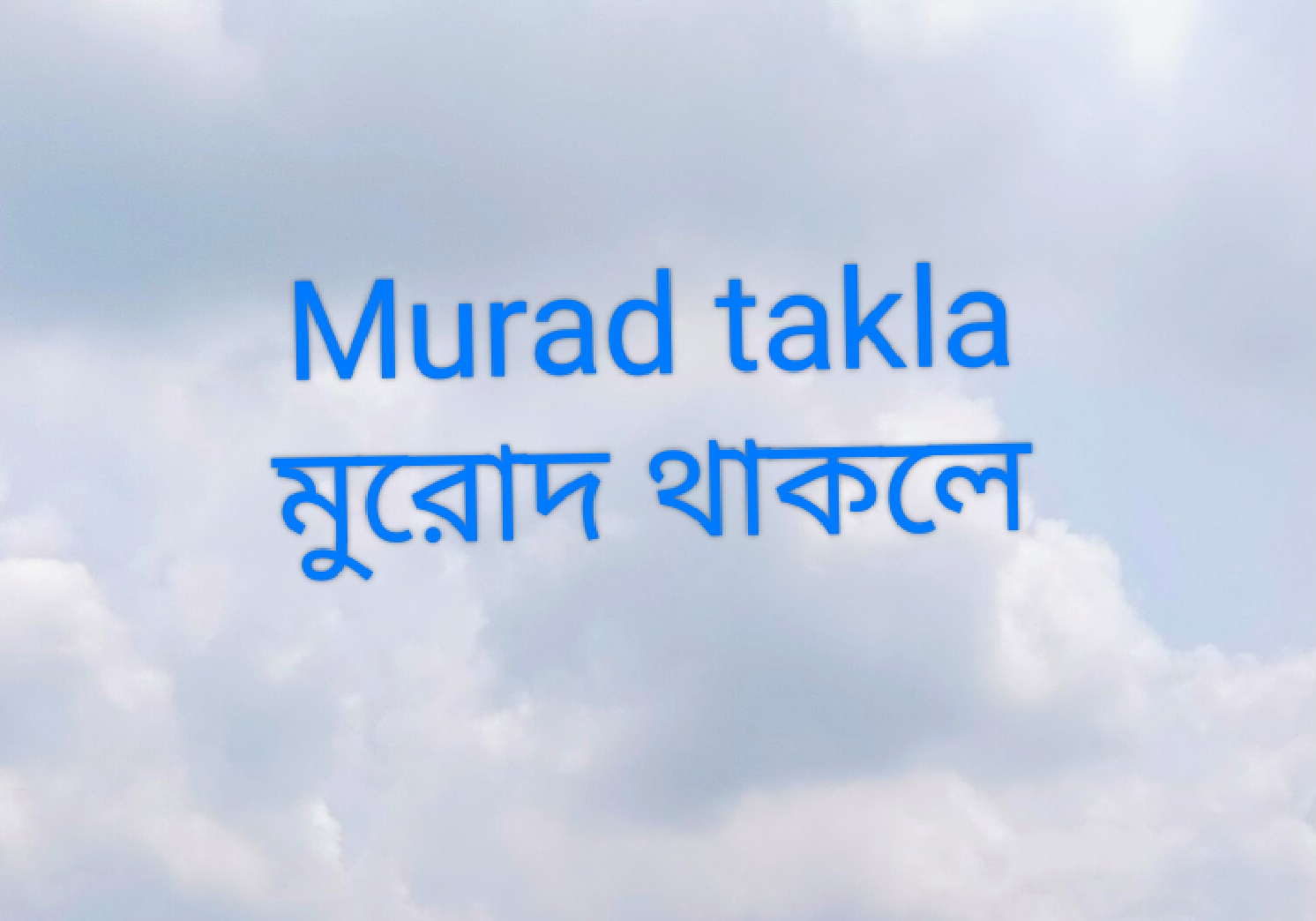
The phrase Murad Takla written in Latin script, alongside Murod thakle in Bengali script

== History ==
The term Murad Takla originated from a Facebook comment posted on 14 July 2012. (Note: The comment was made by a person named Jayanta Kumar. The comment was "Murad takla jukti dia kata bal, faltu pic dicos kan! Lakapora koira kata bal" (Bengali: ‘‘মুরোদ থাকলে যুক্তি দিয়া কথা বল, ফালতু পিক দিছস কেন? লেখাপড়া কইরা কথা বল’’).) In the thread, one user advised another to speak logically, asked why they had a "lame" profile picture, and told them to learn before speaking. A screenshot of the comment went viral on Facebook due to its unintentional humour: the commenter wrote Murad Takla (intended as Murod thakle, Banglish for "if you have courage"), but the pronunciation resembled "a bald person named Murad". The phrase became popular and synonymous with writing distorted Bengali using the Latin script.

Following the incident, a Facebook page named Murad Takla was created on 18 November 2012. The page, dedicated to sharing humorous posts written in Bengali using Latin letters, gained popularity and raised awareness of the potential difficulties in transliteration.

The term was also applied to Bangladeshi politician Murad Hasan following a controversy involving a leaked phone call. Discussions surrounding Hasan caused some confusion regarding the term's origin.

== Dictionary ==
In 2020, Simu Nasser and Pian Mughdha Nabi published the Murad Takla Dictionary to assist in interpreting sentences written in the "Takla language".

== Examples ==
Takla version	Literal Bengali script	Intended Bengali meaning	Literal meaning in English	Intended meaning in English	Source
Apnar sala kaman asa	আপনার শালা কামান আসা?	আপনার ছেলে কেমন আছে?	How is your brother-in-law.	How is your son?	
Pritibi ghora	পৃতিবী ঘোড়া	পৃথিবী ঘুরে।	The Earth is horse.	The Earth is spinning.	
guar bata	গুয়ার বাটা	জোয়ার ভাটা।	Poop paste.	High and low tide	
Tomay mane pade	তোমায় মানে পাদে	তোমায় মনে পড়ে।	Mind farts in you.	Reminds me of you.	
cok dia pani portase	কোক দিয়া পানি পরতাসে	চোখ দিয়ে পানি পরছে।	Water is coming out of my cock.	There are tears in my eyes.	
Dora cola gala sobai vola jai kasa takla sobai mona raka atai jibon	ডোরা কোলা গালা সবাই ভোলা যাই কাছা টাকলা সবাই মোনা রাকা এটাই জীবন	দূরে চলে গেলে সবাই ভুলে যায়। কাছে থাকলে সবাই মনে রাখে, এটাই জীবন।	Dora Cola cheek chews goes Bhola then raw bald Mona Raka that's life.	When you're far away, people forget you. When you're near, they remember you, this is life.	
gebonta pasa kala hoa gelo	গেবনটা পাসা কালা হোয়া গেলো	জীবনটা পাশা খেলা হয়ে গেল।	My life is now like black ass.	My life has become a dice game.	
Jakan rattri nijom nai coke gom, akla sonna gare, tomay mane pade amar... tomay mane pade...	জাকান রাত্রী নিজম নাই ককে গম, একলা সন্না গারে, তোমায় মানে পাদে আমার, তোমায় মানে পাদে।	যখন রাত্রি নিঝুম, নাই চোখে ঘুম, একলা শুন্য ঘরে, তোমায় মনে পড়ে আমার, তোমায় মনে পড়ে।	When the night is dark and there's no wheat on my cock, alone in a hut, mind farts in you Allah, mind farts in you.	When the night is gloomy, no sleep in my eyes, I remember of you my lord, I remember of you.	
Happiness is Baby Vagina ke shower korano and dustami kora	হ্যাপিনেস ইজ বেবি ভ্যাজাইনা কে শাওয়ার করানো এন্ড দুষ্টামি করা	হ্যাপিনেস ইজ বেবি ভাগিনা কে শাওয়ার করানো এন্ড দুষ্টামি করা।	Happiness is showering my baby vagina and having fun with it.	Happiness is showering my baby nephew and having fun.	
geboner pode pode bada asbe kintu tomar calia gata hoba	গেবনের পদে পদে বাদা আসবে কিন্তু তোমার কালিয়া গাতা হবা	জীবনের পদে পদে বাধা আসবে, কিন্তু তোমার চালিয়ে যেতে হবে।	Scratch Gebon's asshole but your black-hole will be poked. (Note: There are no literal translatable English words for Calia (কালিয়া), Gebon (গেবন), Pode (পোঁদে), and Asbe (আচবে). However, the word কালিয়া is synonymous to কালো (Black) in Bengali. The word পোঁদে is a slang for the word "anus." The word আচবে is recognizable with আঁচড়ানো (scratching).)	There will be obstacles in the way of life, but you have to keep going.	
ame tomr pasa takla to vlo hoto	আমে তোমর পাসা টাকলা তো ভ্লো হতো	আমি তোমার পাশে থাকলে তো ভালো হতো	It would've been better if I were in your ass.	I wish I could be right there with you.	
Aka Aka gura guri kerlam tar fucke eaka pik milan kamon hlo fed	আকা আকা গুঁড়া গড়ি করলাম তার ফাকে ইয়কা পিক মিলান কামন এইসলো ফেড	একা একা ঘোরাঘুরি করলাম, তার ফাঁকে একটা পিক নিলাম। কেমন হলো ফ্রেন্ডস?	I alone powdered clock then fucked Eaka in Milan, how's it fed?	I was walking around alone, and took a picture, how's it friends?	

== See also ==
- Romanisation of Bengali
- Banglish
- Chalaiden
- Kakoli Furniture
- Mondegreen
