= Web audience measurement =

Web Audience Measurement (WAM) is an audience measurement and website analytics tool that measures Internet usage in India. The system, a joint effort of IMRB International and Internet and Mobile Association of India surveys over 6000 individuals across 8 metropolitan centers in India and tracks a variety of metrics such as time-on-site, exposure, reach and frequency of Internet usage.

WAM uses audience measurement and is a continuous tracking panel study that provides cross sectional data on Internet usage segmented by gender, SEC and location. This panel-based approach uses metering technology, design for an Indian context that tracks computers. The metering device is capable of capturing Internet usage data across multiple machines and browsers, attributing activity to individual panel members even when a device is shared by multiple users.

Web Rating Points factor multiple measures of Internet usage to provide a more comprehensive picture to web advertisers and attempts to standardize web analytics in India. The web analytics market in India is currently fragmented, with Comscore and Vizisense being IMRB's key competitors. Several discussions revolve around the difference between the numbers provided by all the competitors in the digital audience measurement space. Therefore, choosing the right measurement partner is imperative for media stakeholders. This creates rifts between users of two different audience measurement tools.
