= Research International =

- Formerly: Research Bureau Limited
- Company type: Private
- Industry: Marketing research
- Predecessor: Unilever Market Research
- Founded: London, UK (1962)
- Defunct: 2009
- Fate: Absorbed by TNS
- Headquarters: London, United Kingdom
- Area served: Europe; United States
- Owners: Unilever (1962-1986); Ogilvy Group (1986-1989); WPP Group (from 1989)
- Parent: Kantar Group (WPP)

Research International was a British-based international marketing research company, created in 1962 as a daughter company of Unilever and originally known as Research Bureau Limited, RBL. The company was the result of a merger of the central Unilever Market Research Department and the research unit of Unilever's in-house advertising agency, Lintas. The purpose was to offer Unilever's long-standing market research know-how as a service to other companies, thus converting two internal cost centres to a profitable daughter company.

In 1966, Eileen Cole, who had worked in Unilever since 1948 and had been an early group leader within Unilever Market Research Department, became the managing director of RBL and began to grow its external business.

In 1973, Unilever created the European Market Research Group (EMRG), an umbrella organisation where RBL and its six overseas subsidiaries (among them SUMA in Belgium, CER in Italy and IFH in Sweden), as well as Unilever's larger marketing research companies in West Germany (IVE), France (SECED) and the Netherlands (Socmar), began to coordinate their activities and offer external clients multinational research reports. Eileen Cole was made its chairman and the German, French and Dutch companies were moved much closer to RBL.

In 1986, the Ogilvy Group acquired RBL and the other EMRG companies from Unilever, and Philip Barnard, who had been working in RBL and various other EMRG companies for many years, became the new MD for the acquired group of companies.

The name Research International had begun as an umbrella brand under which EMRG presented multi-country studies. Eventually the individual companies began to be called Research International UK, Research International Nederland etc. in international presentations, although they retained their legal names locally. In 1986, following the acquisition by Ogily, Research International became the official name for the whole group.

In 1989, Martin Sorrell's WPP Group bought the Ogilvy Group, and in 1993 WPP created Kantar as an umbrella company for its marketing research companies. Research International's Philip Barnard became Kantar's first CEO and chairman. He retired from his post in 1999.

In 2008, WPP acquired the leading marketing research company TNS for Kantar, and the following year all the Research International companies were moved into TNS.
