= Scheduled Castes and Scheduled Tribes =

Official designations given to various groups of indigenous people in India

The Scheduled Castes (SCs; anusūcit jāti) and Scheduled Tribes (STs; anusūcit janjāti) are officially designated groups of people and among the most disadvantaged socio-economic groups in India. The terms are recognised in the Constitution of India and the groups are designated in one or other of the categories. For much of the period of British rule in the Indian subcontinent, they were known as the Depressed Classes.

Scheduled castes distribution in India by state and union territory according to 2011 Census. Punjab had the highest percentage of its population as SC (~32%), while Nagaland, Arunachal Pradesh, Andaman and Nicobar Islands and Lakshadweep had 0%.

Scheduled Tribes distribution in India by state and union territory according to 2011 Census. Mizoram and Lakshadweep had the highest percentage of its population as ST (~95%), while Punjab, Haryana, Delhi, and Chandigarh had 0%.

In modern literature, many castes under the Scheduled Castes category are sometimes referred to as Dalit, meaning "broken" or "dispersed". The term was popularised by the Dalit leader B. R. Ambedkar during the independence struggle. Ambedkar preferred the term Dalit over Gandhi's term Harijan, meaning "people of Hari" (lit. 'Man of God'). Similarly, the Scheduled Tribes are often referred to as Adivasi (earliest inhabitants), Vanvasi (inhabitants of forest) and Vanyajati (people of forest). However, the Government of India refrains from using these terms that carry controversial connotations. For example, 'Dalit', which literally means 'oppressed', has been historically associated with notions of uncleanness, carries implications of the concept of untouchability. Similarly, 'Adivasi', which means 'original inhabitants', carries implications of native and immigrant distinctions and also perpetuates the stereotypes of being civilised and uncivilised. Therefore, the constitutionally recognised terms "Scheduled Castes" (Anusuchit Jati) and "Scheduled Tribes" (Anusuchit Janjati) are preferred in official usage, as these designated terms are intended to address socio-economic disabilities, without reimposing those social stigmas and issues. In September 2018, the government issued an advisory to all private satellite channels asking them to refrain from using the derogatory nomenclature 'Dalit', though rights groups have come out against any shift from 'Dalit' in popular usage.

The Scheduled Castes and Scheduled Tribes comprise about 16.6% and 8.6%, respectively, of India's population (according to the 2011 census). The Constitution (Scheduled Castes) Order, 1950 lists 1,108 castes across 28 states in its First Schedule, and the Constitution (Scheduled Tribes) Order, 1950 lists 744 tribes across 22 states in its First Schedule.

Since the independence of India, the Scheduled Castes and Scheduled Tribes were given reservation status, guaranteeing political representation, preference in promotion, quota in universities, free and stipended education, scholarships, banking services, various government schemes and the Constitution lays down the general principles of positive discrimination for SCs and STs.

== Definition ==
Scheduled Castes

Article 366 (24) of the Constitution of India defines the Scheduled Castes as:

Such castes, races or tribes or part of or groups within such castes, races or tribes as are deemed under Article 341 to be Scheduled Castes for the purpose of this [Indian] constitution.

Scheduled Tribes

Article 366 (25) of the Constitution of India defines the Scheduled Tribes as:

Such tribes or tribal communities or part of or groups within such tribes or tribal communities as are deemed under Article 342 to the Scheduled Tribes for the purposes of this [Indian] Constitution.

=== Identification and procedures ===
Article 341

(1) The President may with respect to any State or Union Territory and where it is a State after consultation with the Governor thereof, by public notification specify the castes, races or tribes or parts of or groups within castes, races or tribes which shall for the purposes of this Constitution be deemed to be Scheduled Castes in relation to that State or Union Territory, as the case may be.

(2) Parliament may by law include in or exclude from the list of Scheduled Castes specified in a notification issued under clause of any caste, race or tribe or part of or group within any caste, race or tribe, but save as aforesaid a notification issued under the said clause shall not be varied by any subsequent notification.

Article 342

(1) The President may with respect to any State or Union Territory and where it is a State, after consultation with the Governor thereof by public notification, specify the tribes or tribal communities or parts of or groups within tribes or tribal communities which shall for the purpose of this Constitution be deemed to be Scheduled Tribes in relation to that State or Union Territory, as the case may be.

(2) Parliament may by law include in or exclude from the list of Scheduled Tribes specified in a notification issued under clause any tribe or tribal community or part of or group within any tribe or tribal community, but save as aforesaid a notification issued under the said clause shall not be varied by any subsequent notification.

Bureaucratic process for scheduling communities as SC/ST.

The castes and tribes notified under Articles 341 and 342 of the Constitution of India are recognised as Scheduled Castes and Scheduled Tribes. For the purpose of social justice, those scheduled castes and tribes are provided social security and adequate representation in education, employment, and governance, facilitating their upliftment and integration into mainstream society. The process of including and excluding communities, castes, or tribes to/from the list of Scheduled Castes and Scheduled Tribes adheres to certain silent criteria and procedures established by the Lokur committee in 1965. For Scheduled Castes (SCs), the criteria involve extreme social, educational, and economic backwardness resulting from the practice of untouchability. On the other hand, Scheduled Tribes (STs) are identified based on indications of primitive traits, distinctive culture, geographical isolation, shyness of contact with the larger community, and overall backwardness. The scheduling process refers back to the definitions of communities used in the colonial census along with modern anthropological study and is guided by Article 341 and 342. Per the first clause of Article 341 and 342, the list of Scheduled communities is subject to specific state and union territory, with area restrictions to districts, subdistricts, and tehsils. Furthermore, members of Scheduled Communities are entitled based on religious criteria: Scheduled Castes must be adherents of Hinduism, Sikhism, or Buddhism, whereas Scheduled Tribes can belong to any religion to be recognised as Scheduled.

== History ==
=== Pre-independence ===
The evolution of the lower caste and tribe into the modern-day Scheduled Caste and Scheduled Tribe is complex. The caste system as a stratification of classes in India originated about 2,000 years ago, and has been influenced by dynasties and ruling elites, including the Mughal Empire and the British Raj. The Hindu concept of Varna historically incorporated occupation-based communities. Some low-caste groups, such as those formerly called untouchables who constitute modern-day Scheduled Castes, were considered outside the Varna system.

Since the 1850s, these communities were loosely referred to as Depressed Classes, with the Scheduled Castes and Scheduled Tribes. The early 20th century saw a flurry of activity in the British authorities assessing the feasibility of responsible self-government for India. The Morley–Minto Reforms Report, Montagu–Chelmsford Reforms Report and the Simon Commission were several initiatives in this context. A highly contested issue in the proposed reforms was the reservation of seats for representation of the Depressed Classes in provincial and central legislatures.

In 1935, the UK Parliament passed the Government of India Act 1935, designed to give Indian provinces greater self-rule and set up a national federal structure. The reservation of seats for the Depressed Classes was incorporated into the act, which came into force in 1937. The Act introduced the term "Scheduled Castes", defining the group as "such castes, parts of groups within castes, which appear to His Majesty in Council to correspond to the classes of persons formerly known as the 'Depressed Classes', as His Majesty in Council may prefer". This discretionary definition was clarified in The Government of India (Scheduled Castes) Order, 1936, which contained a list (or Schedule) of castes throughout the British-administered provinces.

=== Post-independence ===
After independence the Constituent Assembly continued the prevailing definition of Scheduled Castes and Tribes, giving (via articles 341 and 342) the president of India and governors of the states a mandate to compile a full listing of castes and tribes (with the power to edit it later, as required). The first list of castes and tribes was created through two orders: The Constitution (Scheduled Castes) Order, 1950, and The Constitution (Scheduled Tribes) Order, 1950, containing 821 castes and 296 tribes (overlapping nature), respectively, derived from colonial lists. (Note: The first Scheduled orders were enacted by two segments, viz, 1950 order and 1951 order, enlisting 821 castes and 296 tribes in the Presidential Scheduled list. The Constitution (Scheduled Castes) Order, 1950, and The Constitution (Scheduled Tribes) Order, 1950, listed 607 castes and 241 tribes, respectively. Similarly, The Constitution (Scheduled Castes) (Part C States) Order, 1951, and The Constitution (Scheduled Tribes) (Part C States) Order, 1951, listed 214 castes and 55 tribes. The 1950 orders applied to 16 Part A and B states: Assam, Bihar, Bombay, Madhya Pradesh, Madras, Orissa, Punjab, West Bengal, Hyderabad, Madhya Bharat, Mysore, Rajasthan, Saurashtra, and Travancore-Cochin, while the 1951 orders addressed 10 Part C states: Ajmer, Bhopal, Coorg, Himachal Pradesh, Kutch, Manipur, Tripura, and Vindhya Pradesh.) Subsequently, the Presidential Scheduled List was modified in 1956 by the Scheduled Castes and Scheduled Tribes Lists (Modification) Order, 1956, to include other areas, newly formed states/UTs, and communities that had not been considered during the adoption of the Constitution of India. and The Constitution (Scheduled Tribes) Order, 1950, However, the classification and maintenance of the list Scheduled Castes and Scheduled Tribes was initially intended to be a state matter during drafting of the constitution, concerns over political misuse led to the centralisation of authority under the Presidential Scheduled Lists. After 15 years since the order of listing Scheduled Castes and Scheduled Tribes, the government adopted updated criteria for inclusion and exclusion based on the Lokur committee report of 1965. Due to inclusive policies, many communities were added to the Presidential Scheduled List through amendments since the adoption of the Constitution, bringing the total to over 1,000 Scheduled Castes and over 500 Scheduled Tribes by 2018.

== Demographics ==
=== Historical population ===
Historical population by social groups of India.

Historical Populations of Scheduled Communities
Census	Scheduled Castes			Scheduled Tribes		
Census	Percentage	Numbers	±%	Percentage	Numbers	±%
1881	—N/a	—N/a	—N/a	2.6%	6,420,000	—
1891	—N/a	—N/a	—N/a	3.3%	9,110,000	+41.9
1901	—N/a	—N/a	—N/a	2.9%	8,180,000	−10.2
1911	—N/a	—N/a	—N/a	3.2%	9,590,000	+17.2
1921	17.2%	52,700,000	—	3.0%	9,070,000	−5.4
1931	14.9%	50,200,000	−4.7	2.5%	7,620,000	−16.0
1941	12.6%	48,810,000	−2.8	2.3%	8,790,000	+15.4
1951	14.4%	51,340,000	+5.2	5.3%	19,110,000	+117.4
1961	14.7%	64,410,000	+25.5	6.9%	30,130,000	+57.7
1971	14.6%	80,000,000	+24.2	6.9%	38,010,000	+26.2
1981	15.8%	104,750,000	+30.9	7.8%	51,620,000	+35.8
1991	16.5%	138,220,000	+32.0	8.1%	67,750,000	+31.2
2001	16.2%	166,630,000	+20.6	8.2%	84,320,000	+24.5
2011	16.6%	201,370,000	+20.8	8.6%	104,540,000	+24

=== Current population ===
Population of Scheduled Castes and Scheduled Tribes, by state, 2011 census
State and Union Territories	Total population of the State and Union Territories	Scheduled Castes				Scheduled Tribes				Total % of SC and ST
State and Union Territories	Total population of the State and Union Territories	No. of notified communities (as of Oct 2017)	Total population	% of total Scheduled Castes	% of State and UT population	No. of notified communities (as of Dec 2017)	Total population	% of Total Scheduled Tribes	% of State and UT population	Total % of SC and ST
Andhra Pradesh (incl. Telangana)	84,580,777	AP: 61; TG: 59	13,878,078	6.89	16.41	AP: 34; TG: 32	5,918,073	5.66	6.99	23.41
Arunachal Pradesh	1,383,727	0	—N/a	—N/a	—N/a	16	951,821	0.91	68.79	68.79
Assam	31,205,576	16	2,231,321	1.11	7.15	29	3,884,371	3.72	12.45	19.60
Bihar	104,099,452	23	16,567,325	8.23	15.91	32	1,336,573	1.28	1.28	17.19
Chhattisgarh	25,545,198	44	3,274,269	1.63	12.82	42	7,822,902	7.48	30.62	43.44
Goa	1,458,545	5	25,449	0.01	1.74	8	149,275	0.14	10.23	11.97
Gujarat	60,439,692	36	4,074,447	2.02	6.74	32	8,917,174	8.53	14.75	21.49
Haryana	25,351,462	37	5,113,615	2.54	20.17	0	—N/a	—N/a	—N/a	20.17
Himachal Pradesh	6,864,602	57	1,729,252	0.86	25.19	10	392,126	0.38	5.71	30.90
Jharkhand	32,988,134	22	3,985,644	1.98	12.08	32	8,645,042	8.27	26.21	38.29
Karnataka	61,095,297	101	10,474,992	5.2	17.15	50	4,248,987	4.06	6.95	24.10
Kerala	33,406,061	69	3,039,573	1.51	9.1	43	484,839	0.46	1.45	10.55
Madhya Pradesh	72,626,809	48	11,342,320	5.63	15.62	46	15,316,784	14.65	21.09	36.71
Maharashtra	112,374,333	59	13,275,898	6.59	11.81	47	10,510,213	10.05	9.35	21.16
Manipur	2,855,794	7	97,328	0.05	3.41	34	1,167,422	1.12	40.88	44.29
Meghalaya	2,966,889	16	17,355	0.01	0.58	17	2,555,861	2.44	86.15	86.73
Mizoram	1,097,206	16	1,218	0	0.11	15	1,036,115	0.99	94.43	94.54
Nagaland	1,978,502	0	—N/a	—N/a	—N/a	5	1,710,973	1.64	86.48	86.48
Odisha	41,974,218	95	7,188,463	3.57	17.13	62	9,590,756	9.17	22.85	39.98
Punjab	27,743,338	39	8,860,179	4.4	31.94	0	—N/a	—N/a	—N/a	31.94
Rajasthan	68,548,437	59	12,221,593	6.07	17.83	12	9,238,534	8.84	13.48	31.31
Sikkim	610,577	4	28,275	0.01	4.63	4	206,360	0.2	33.8	38.43
Tamil Nadu	72,147,030	76	14,438,445	7.17	20.01	36	794,697	0.76	1.1	21.11
Tripura	3,673,917	34	654,918	0.33	17.83	19	1,166,813	1.12	31.76	49.59
Uttar Pradesh	199,812,341	66	41,357,608	20.54	20.7	15	1,134,273	1.08	0.57	21.27
Uttarakhand	10,086,292	65	1,892,516	0.94	18.76	5	291,903	0.28	2.89	21.65
West Bengal	91,276,115	60	21,463,270	10.66	23.51	40	5,296,953	5.07	5.8	29.31
Andaman and Nicobar Islands	380,581	0	—N/a	—N/a	—N/a	6	28,530	0.03	7.5	7.5
Chandigarh	1,055,450	36	199,086	0.1	18.86	0	—N/a	—N/a	—N/a	18.86
Dadra and Nagar Haveli	343,709	4	6,186	0	1.8	7	178,564	0.17	51.95	54.47
Daman and Diu	243,247	5	6,124	0	2.52	5	15,363	0.01	6.32	8.84
Jammu and Kashmir	12,541,302	13	924,991	0.46	7.38	12	1,493,299	1.43	11.91	19.29
Lakshadweep	64,473	0	—N/a	—N/a	—N/a	native pop.	61,120	0.06	94.8	94.8
Delhi	16,787,941	36	2,812,309	1.4	16.75	0	—N/a	—N/a	—N/a	16.75
Puducherry	1,247,953	16	196,325	0.1	15.73	0	—N/a	—N/a	—N/a	15.73
India	1,210,854,977	1,284^{*}	201,378,372	100	16.63	747^{*}	104,545,716	100	8.63	25.26

Note
- The census figures for Scheduled Castes and Scheduled Tribes represent selective demography, as the first clause of Articles 341 and 342 specifies that Schedule status is specific to a state or union territory (indicating nativeness of the region and the socio-economic disabilities arising therein), not to the whole country based on ethnicity or ancestry. For example, during the census operation, if a member of a notified community resides outside the state or union territory where the community isn't recognised as such, or if a member of Scheduled Castes follows religions other than Hinduism, Buddhism, or Sikhism, they are not counted as part of the Scheduled Castes or Scheduled Tribes, but rather as part of the general population.
- In the states of Arunachal Pradesh and Nagaland, and the Union Territories of Andaman and Nicobar Islands and Lakshadweep, no community is notified as Scheduled Castes; thus, there is no Scheduled Caste population.
- In the states of Punjab and Haryana, and the Union Territories of Delhi, Chandigarh and Puducherry, no community is notified as Scheduled Tribes; thus, there is no Scheduled Tribe population.

=== Religion ===
State wise religion of Scheduled Castes and Scheduled Tribes, 2011 census
States and Union Territories	Scheduled Caste			Scheduled Tribe							
States and Union Territories	Hindu	Sikh	Buddhist	Hindu	Muslim	Christian	Sikh	Buddhist	Jain	Others	Religion not stated
Andhra Pradesh (incl. Telangana)	13,848,473	2,053	27,552	5,808,126	28,586	57,280	890	608	644	810	21,129
Arunachal Pradesh	—N/a	—N/a	—N/a	97,629	3,567	389,507	245	96,391	441	358,663	5,378
Assam	2,229,445	1,335	541	3,349,772	13,188	495,379	387	7,667	424	12,039	5,515
Bihar	16,563,145	1,595	2,585	1,277,870	11,265	32,523	150	252	123	10,865	3,525
Chhattisgarh	3,208,726	1,577	63,966	6,933,333	8,508	385,041	620	1,078	312	488,097	5,913
Goa	25,265	7	177	99,789	531	48,783	20	62	18	12	60
Gujarat	4,062,061	1,038	11,348	8,747,349	34,619	120,777	1,262	1,000	1,266	3,412	7,489
Haryana	4,906,560	204,805	2,250	—N/a	—N/a	—N/a	—N/a	—N/a	—N/a	—N/a	—N/a
Himachal Pradesh	1,709,634	15,939	3,679	307,914	37,208	275	294	45,998	54	23	360
Jharkhand	3,983,629	669	1,346	3,245,856	18,107	1,338,175	984	2,946	381	4,012,622	25,971
Karnataka	10,418,989	2,100	53,903	4,171,265	44,599	12,811	802	472	1,152	665	17,221
Kerala	3,039,057	291	225	431,155	18,320	32,844	42	44	18	376	2,040
Madhya Pradesh	11,140,007	2,887	199,426	14,589,855	33,305	88,548	1,443	1,796	852	584,338	16,647
Maharashtra	8,060,130	11,484	5,204,284	10,218,315	112,753	20,335	2,145	20,798	1,936	93,646	40,285
Manipur	97,238	39	51	8,784	4,296	1,137,318	209	2,326	288	11,174	3,027
Meghalaya	16,718	528	109	122,141	10,012	2,157,887	301	6,886	254	251,612	6,768
Mizoram	1,102	9	107	5,920	4,209	933,302	62	91,054	343	751	474
Nagaland	—N/a	—N/a	—N/a	15,035	5,462	1,680,424	175	4,901	500	3,096	1,380
Odisha	7,186,698	825	940	8,271,054	15,335	816,981	1,019	1,959	448	470,267	13,693
Punjab	3,442,305	5,390,484	27,390	—N/a	—N/a	—N/a	—N/a	—N/a	—N/a	—N/a	—N/a
Rajasthan	11,999,984	214,837	6,772	9,190,789	13,340	25,375	663	445	622	1,376	5,924
Sikkim	28,016	15	244	40,340	369	16,899	72	1,36,041	125	12,306	208
Tamil Nadu	14,435,679	1,681	1,085	783,942	2,284	7,222	84	50	45	55	1,015
Tripura	654,745	69	104	888,790	2,223	153,061	250	1,19,894	318	768	1,509
Uttar Pradesh	41,192,566	27,775	137,267	1,099,924	21,735	1,011	264	353	410	2,404	8,172
Uttarakhand	1,883,611	7,989	916	287,809	1,847	437	364	1,142	7	9	288
West Bengal	21,454,358	3,705	5,207	3,914,473	30,407	343,893	1,003	220,963	876	774,450	10,888
Andaman and Nicobar Islands	—N/a	—N/a	—N/a	156	1,026	26,512	0	85	0	344	407
Chandigarh	176,283	22,659	144	—N/a	—N/a	—N/a	—N/a	—N/a	—N/a	—N/a	—N/a
Dadra and Nagar Haveli	6,047	0	139	175,305	242	2,658	15	12	4	54	274
Daman and Diu	6082	1	41	15,207	125	16	0	1	1	0	13
Jammu and Kashmir	913,507	11,301	183	67,384	1,320,408	1,775	665	100,803	137	1,170	957
Lakshadweep	—N/a	—N/a	—N/a	44	61,037	3	4	2	10	4	16
Delhi	2,780,811	25,934	5,564	—N/a	—N/a	—N/a	—N/a	—N/a	—N/a	—N/a	—N/a
Puducherry	196,261	33	31	—N/a	—N/a	—N/a	—N/a	—N/a	—N/a	—N/a	—N/a
India (%)	189,667,132 (94.18%)	5,953,664 (2.96%)	5,757,576 (2.86%)	84,165,325 (80.51%)	1,858,913 (1.78%)	10,327,052 (9.88%)	14,434 (0.01%)	866,029 (0.83%)	12,009 (0.01%)	7,095,408 (6.79%)	206,546 (0.2%)

Note
- The census figures for Scheduled Castes and Scheduled Tribes represent selective demography, as the first clause of Articles 341 and 342 specifies that Schedule status is specific to a state or union territory (indicating nativeness of the region and the socio-economic disabilities arising therein), not to the whole country based on ethnicity or ancestry. For example, during the census operation, if a member of a notified community resides outside the state or union territory where the community isn't recognised as such, or if a member of Scheduled Castes follows religions other than Hinduism, Buddhism, or Sikhism, they are not counted as part of the Scheduled Castes or Scheduled Tribes, but rather as part of the general population.
- In the states of Arunachal Pradesh and Nagaland, and the Union Territories of Andaman and Nicobar Islands and Lakshadweep, no community is notified as Scheduled Castes; thus, there is no Scheduled Caste population.
- In the states of Punjab and Haryana, and the Union Territories of Delhi, Chandigarh and Puducherry, no community is notified as Scheduled Tribes; thus, there is no Scheduled Tribe population.

=== Literacy ===
Growth of literacy rate for among social groups.

Effective Literacy Rate of Scheduled Castes and Scheduled Tribes, by state, 2011 census
States and Union Territories	Scheduled Caste			Scheduled Tribe		
States and Union Territories	Total	Male	Female	Total	Male	Female
Andhra Pradesh	62.28	70.23	54.44	49.21	58.35	40.09
Assam	76.99	83.17	70.45	72.06	78.96	65.1
Bihar	48.65	57.97	38.46	51.08	61.31	40.38
Chhattisgarh	70.76	81.66	59.86	59.09	69.67	48.76
Gujarat	79.18	87.87	69.87	62.48	71.68	53.16
Haryana	66.85	75.93	56.65	—N/a	—N/a	—N/a
Himachal Pradesh	78.92	86.23	71.46	73.64	83.17	64.2
Jharkhand	55.89	66.94	44.2	57.13	68.17	46.2
Karnataka	65.33	74.03	56.58	62.08	71.14	52.98
Kerala	88.73	92.64	85.07	75.81	80.76	71.08
Madhya Pradesh	66.16	76.72	54.7	50.55	59.55	41.47
Maharashtra	79.66	87.18	71.89	65.73	74.27	57.02
Manipur	76.09	83.41	68.79	72.58	77.33	67.81
Meghalaya	68.57	74.89	61.43	74.53	75.54	73.55
Mizoram	92.43	93.08	91.04	91.51	93.59	89.47
Nagaland	—N/a	—N/a	—N/a	80.04	83.11	76.91
Odisha	69.02	79.21	58.76	52.24	63.7	41.2
Punjab	64.81	70.66	58.39	—N/a	—N/a	—N/a
Rajasthan	59.75	73.77	44.63	52.8	67.62	37.27
Sikkim	77.54	82.8	72.04	79.74	85.01	74.27
Tamil Nadu	73.26	80.94	65.64	54.34	61.81	46.8
Tripura	89.45	92.78	85.98	79.05	86.43	71.59
Uttar Pradesh	60.89	71.77	48.87	55.68	67.08	43.72
Uttarakhand	74.41	84.34	64.05	73.88	83.56	63.89
West Bengal	69.43	77.22	61.23	57.93	68.17	47.71
Andaman & Nicobar Islands	—N/a	—N/a	—N/a	75.58	80.87	69.92
Chandigarh	76.45	83.57	68.27	—N/a	—N/a	—N/a
Dadra & Nagar Haveli	89.42	93.11	85.03	61.85	73.62	50.27
Daman & Diu	92.56	96.79	88.09	78.79	86.23	71.23
Goa	83.73	89.9	77.69	79.14	87.16	71.53
Jammu & Kashmir	70.16	78.79	60.67	50.56	60.58	39.73
Lakshadweep	—N/a	—N/a	—N/a	91.7	95.69	87.76
Delhi	78.89	86.77	70.01	—N/a	—N/a	—N/a
Puducherry	77.9	85.22	71.05	—N/a	—N/a	—N/a

== Provisions ==
To effectively implement the safeguards built into the Constitution and other legislation, the Constitution under Articles 338 and 338A provides for two constitutional commissions: the National Commission for Scheduled Castes, and the National Commission for Scheduled Tribes. The chairpersons of both commissions sit ex officio on the National Human Rights Commission.

The Constitution provides a three-pronged strategy to improve the situation of SCs and STs:

- Protective arrangements: Such measures as are required to enforce equality, to provide punitive measures for transgressions, and to eliminate established practices that perpetuate inequities. A number of laws were enacted to implement the provisions in the Constitution. Examples of such laws include the Untouchability Practices Act, 1955, Scheduled Caste and Scheduled Tribe (Prevention of Atrocities) Act, 1989, The Employment of Manual Scavengers and Construction of Dry Latrines (Prohibition) Act, 1993, etc. Despite legislation, social discrimination and atrocities against the backward castes continued to persist.
- Affirmative action: Provide positive treatment in allotment of jobs and access to higher education as a means to accelerate the integration of the SCs and STs with mainstream society. Affirmative action is popularly known as reservation. Article 16 of the Constitution states "nothing in this article shall prevent the State from making any provisions for the reservation of appointments or posts in favor of any backward class of citizens, which, in the opinion of the state, is not adequately represented in the services under the State". The Supreme Court upheld the legality of affirmative action and the Mandal Commission (a report that recommended that affirmative action not only apply to the Untouchables but the other backward class (OBCs) as well). However, the reservations about affirmative action were only allotted in the public sector, not the private.
- Development: Provide resources and benefits to bridge the socioeconomic gap between the SCs and STs and other communities. Legislation to improve the socioeconomic situation of SCs and STs because twenty-seven percent of SC and thirty-seven percent of ST households lived below the poverty line, compared to the mere eleven percent among other households. Additionally, the backward castes were poorer than other groups in Indian society, and they suffered from higher morbidity and mortality rates.

=== Implementation ===
==== Scheduled Castes Sub-Plan ====
The Scheduled Castes Sub-Plan (SCSP) of 1979 mandated a planning process for the social, economic and educational development of Scheduled Castes and improvement in their working and living conditions. It was an umbrella strategy, ensuring the flow of targeted financial and physical benefits from the general sector of development to the Scheduled Castes. It entailed a targeted flow of funds and associated benefits from the annual plan of states and Union Territories (UTs) in at least a proportion to the national SC population. Twenty-seven states and UTs with sizeable SC populations are implementing the plan. Although the Scheduled Castes population according to the 2001 Census was 16.66 crores (16.23% of the total population), the allocations made through SCSP have been lower than the proportional population. A strange factor has emerged of extremely lowered fertility of scheduled castes in Kerala, due to land reform, migrating (Kerala Gulf diaspora) and democratisation of education.

== Issue in policy and implementation ==
=== Constitutional history ===
In the original Constitution, Article 338 provided for a special officer (the Commissioner for SCs and STs) responsible for monitoring the implementation of constitutional and legislative safeguards for SCs and STs and reporting to the president. Seventeen regional offices of the Commissioner were established throughout the country.

There was an initiative to replace the Commissioner with a committee in the 48th Amendment to the Constitution, changing Article 338. While the amendment was being debated, the Ministry of Welfare established the first committee for SCs and STs (with the functions of the Commissioner) in August 1978. These functions were modified in September 1987 to include advising the government on broad policy issues and the development levels of SCs and STs. Now it is included in Article 342.

In 1990, Article 338 was amended for the National Commission for SCs and STs with the Constitution (Sixty fifth Amendment) Bill, 1990. The first commission under the 65th Amendment was constituted in March 1992, replacing the Commissioner for Scheduled Castes and Scheduled Tribes and the commission established by the Ministry of Welfare's Resolution of 1989. In 2003, the Constitution was again amended to divide the National Commission for Scheduled Castes and Scheduled Tribes into two commissions: the National Commission for Scheduled Castes and the National Commission for Scheduled Tribes.

=== Issue with scheduling and de-scheduling ===
During the drafting of the Constitution of India, the Prime Minister of India, Jawaharlal Nehru, appointed B. R. Ambedkar as the Minister of Justice. Ambedkar and Nehru both were concerned about groups deemed oppressed and disadvantaged, referred to as subalterns in postcolonial studies. In post-colonial India, one of the most disadvantaged groups included the former untouchables, for whom Ambedkar insisted on the establishment of the category of depressed castes. These subalterns, becoming aware of their subordination during political mobilisations, called themselves Dalits, "the oppressed". The Government of India instituted affirmative action for the most highly disadvantaged groups to improve their socio-economic standing and well-being. The Indian government distinguished the disadvantaged populations from one another by their membership in the caste system and tribal affiliation. The “tribal” groups were identified as minorities belong to the oral tradition, standing outside the Varna-Jāti Brahmanical hierarchy.

The concept of Scheduled Tribes — according to the official definition — thus refers to populations lagging behind with a low level of human development, and in geographical isolation compared to the rest of Indians, and hence called "backward," a parallel concept to "indigenous peoples" in the Western world. According to Emilie Crémin, these criteria, defined in 1950, nevertheless seem outdated today, since some tribal states such as Nagaland, on the contrary, have an average level of human development index (HDI) compared to the rest of India after their separation from Assam.

=== Religious restriction ===
The Scheduled Castes, as a constitutional category in India, emerged from the practice of untouchability in the caste system associated with Hinduism. Although the Constitution of India did not specify religious criteria, it was accepted by the Constituent Assembly that only adherents of Hinduism would be entitled to Scheduled Caste status. Thus, the Constitution (Scheduled Castes) Order of 1950 specified as such, with the exception of certain communities in relation to Punjab, who could be either Hindu or Sikh. The 1956 amendment extended Scheduled Caste status to Dalit converts to Sikhism nationwide. In 1990, it was further extended to Buddhist converts, following the mass conversion led by B.R. Ambedkar to reject caste discrimination rooted in Hinduism. However, converts to Christianity, Islam, or other religions not specified in the order and subsequent amendments are not entitled to Scheduled Caste status and are not counted as such in census enumeration. According to the Sachar Committee analysis, Scheduled Castes (SCs) make up 19.7% of India's total population. These SCs constitute 89.5% of the Buddhist population, 30.7% of Sikhs, 22.2% of Hindus, 9% of Christians, 0.8% of Muslims, and 2.6% belong to other religious beliefs. Similarly, according to the Pew Research survey, 89% of Buddhists identified as SCs, followed by 47% of Sikhs, 33% of Christians, 25% of Hindus, 4% of Muslims, 3% of Jains, and the remaining 25% of SCs identify as the general population. Overall, estimates of the SC population in India without religious bar vary, such as 25% in Religion 2020, 24% in Global Attitudes 2019, and 23% in Global Attitudes 2017 by the Pew Research Center. Other estimates include 22% by IHDS (2005), 19% by NES (2019), and 21% by NFHS (2015–2016), all of which are higher than the 16% and 17% recorded in the 2001 and 2011 Censuses of India, respectively. The demand for extending Scheduled Caste status to adherents of religions other than Hinduism, Buddhism, and Sikhism has been rejected by the Office of the Registrar General of India, which became the validating authority in 1999. Before that, state recommendations and the approval of the National Commission for Scheduled Castes and Scheduled Tribes were considered for additions, deletions, or modifications to the Presidential Order through Parliament. As a result, individuals converted to religions not specified by the constitutional order often either avoid disclosing their actual religious beliefs or assert their previous religious identity in official records to avail social security and welfare benefits (popularly known as the Reservation) provided by the government. Although those converted SCs fall into the Other Backward Class category, which provides similar affirmative benefits except for political reservation.

=== Area restriction ===
The classification of communities as Scheduled Castes, initially formalised by the British in the early 20th century under the term 'Depressed Classes', was geographically specific, with communities identified at the district or provincial level based on localised patterns of social disadvantage. After independence, this area-based framework was largely retained, as socio-economic disabilities were seen as regionally rooted by social structure.

In most states, the intrastate area restrictions are removed by the Scheduled Castes and Scheduled Tribes Orders (Amendment) Act, 1976. However, the inter-state area restrictions per Article 341(1) and 342(1) are defined by the Constitution. Accordingly, the lists of Scheduled Castes and Scheduled Tribes are specific to each state and union territory.

=== Subclassification ===
The notified Scheduled Castes and Scheduled Tribes were earlier regarded as homogeneous social groups for policy implementation, which resulted in disparities where some communities accessed a disproportionate share of affirmative benefits while more marginalised sections remained excluded from adequate representation. To address this, several state governments, notably Andhra Pradesh and Punjab, introduced sub-classification of Scheduled Castes and Scheduled Tribes for a more equitable distribution of affirmative measures. However, since the authority to maintain the list of Scheduled Castes and Scheduled Tribes rests with the central government, the Supreme Court struck down the sub-classification policy, emphasising homogeneity in the context of the scheduling list.

In 2024, a seven-judge bench of the Supreme Court upheld the constitutional validity of sub-classification, clarifying that while homogeneity applies to the Presidential Scheduled List, it does not restrict state's power vis-à-vis Article 15(4), Article 16(4), and other empowering provisions in policy implementation or the distribution of welfare benefits. The decision affirmed the state's power to adopt sub-classification or other policies for the Scheduled Castes and Scheduled Tribes to ensure an equitable distribution of affirmative action benefits.

== See also ==
- Constitution of India § Schedules
  - Scheduled Areas
  - Scheduled Languages
- List of Scheduled Castes
- List of Scheduled Tribes
- Particularly vulnerable tribal group
- Nomadic tribes in India
- Other Backward Classes
- Forward caste
- Inter-caste marriage in India
- Reservation in India
- 2011 Socio Economic and Caste Census
