= MarketPulse =

MarketPulse is a continuous monthly tracking survey of household purchases in urban and rural India. Established in 1974, it is India's only household panel study that collects information about household purchases. Conducted by IMRB International's Media and Panel Group, it surveys over 70,000 households, 56,000 in urban India, and 14,000 in rural India and collects a variety of information on purchases in fast-moving consumer goods, finance and telecom.

One of the largest continuous tracking studies of its kind anywhere in the world, MarketPulse takes over 1200 field staff to administer the survey, and data is collected primarily through journal placements. As a cross-sectional study that covers a variety of households across the SEC spectrum, with specialised panels for more affluent households. It tracks purchase behavior across 60 different categories such as foods, beverages, personal care products and home care products.

The data from the tracking survey is widely used by companies such as GlaxoSmithKline, Reckitt Benckiser, Unilever, ITC, Marico, and Dabur and serves as an industry-wide benchmark of marketing performance.
