= Bong (term) =

Term

Bong is a neologism that originated in cosmopolitan India in the 1980s as a slightly pejorative exonym for the educated middle-class Bengalis from the Indian state of West Bengal. In the 21st century, the term became a self-appellation of pride through the use of satire and self-reflexive irony by the Bengali blogging community, which came to stand for West Bengalis as a whole. Bong has been noted as a word of Indian English, used in the Indian newspapers.

== Origin ==
In the 1970s, the term was in the National Defence Academy to denote the people from West Bengal. The usage of Bong as an ethnic quip has been noted in the India Today in 1989. Sociologist Prasanta Roy has noted that the word was used in New Delhi in the 1990s. According to lexicographer Ashoke Mukhopadhyay, Bong is a distortion of the word Bengali that originated among the NRIs. Writer Nabarun Bhattacharya believed that the term originated either in the IITs or some other pan-Indian educational institutes. According to a 1999 report in The Indian Express, the gradual extinction of Bengali language and culture and the growing cosmopolitanism in Kolkata have resulted in Bengalis called Bongs by the non-Bengalis. According to blogger Arnab Ray, the Bengalis were traditionally reluctant to leave West Bengal for livelihood. However, in the 1980s, the political scenario changed in West Bengal and the Bengalis were forced to leave the state in search of better career options. This led to the development of Bong identity, which is characterized by their emotional attachment towards West Bengal and at the same time well integrated with the cosmopolitan environment of India and abroad.

== Usage ==
The Anglo-Indian community uses the term as an ethnic slur for the Bengalis. Lexicographer Ashoke Mukhopadhyay believes that the term is slightly pejorative. It has a similar pejorative term as the Hindi term 'Bangali Babu' (literally meaning educated Bengali gentleman). According to sociologist Prasanta Roy, the term conveys hostility, prejudice, political and intellectual dislike. Nabarun Bhattacharya believed that the term was used to tease the Bengalis, who themselves harboured chauvinistic attitude towards others. According to the 1999 report in The Indian Express, Bengalis disliked the term.

In the 21st century, the use of Bong has gained currency among the young generation of West Bengal. Bengali bloggers re-invented their social identity as Bongs. Through satire they have turned the derisive term as a marker of their own ethnic identity. Filmmaker Anjan Dutt believes that Bengalis are okay with calling themselves Bongs. He used the term Bong instead of Bengali for the title of his 2006 film The Bong Connection because it was something that can be used with jest just like Yank. According to him terms like Bong or Yank stand for certain quirks and attributes of the person coming from a particular region. According to New Delhi–based writer Samit Basu, the people who identify themselves as Bong should fight against the age-old stereotypes of the Bengalis. Bengalis had become proud to be known as Bong, as it was no longer an offensive parochial label.

Bong is generally perceived to stand for the global cosmopolitan West Bengali. Blogger Arnab Ray believes that Bong stands for the globalized Bengali. According to a West Bengali civil servant who blogs as Sadoldbong, Bong stands for the Bengali in exile. However, according to Anjan Dutt, there is no cultural or generation gap between the Bong and the Bengali identity. Blogger Sandeepa Mukherjee Datta who blogs as Bong Mom in Bong Mom's Cook Book describes Bong as an identity limited to the Bengali people of West Bengal. Durga Puja has been described as a Bong festival. The prohibition on eating the seasonal Indian plum before the Saraswati Puja has been referred to as Bong cultural heritage.

== Derivatives ==
Bong is listed as a notable word in Indian English. Contemporary Indian English uses several words that are derived from Bong. Examples include Bongdom (Bengali domination), Bongness (attachment to Bengali culture), Banglish (pidgin Indian English consisting of Bengali loanwords), hon-Bong (abbreviation for honorary Bong, a person who is not a Bong, but can be considered a Bong by virtue of his/her acquaintance and closeness to Bongs and Bong culture).

== Stereotypes ==
The Bengali as Bongs are often stereotyped especially in Bollywood and the Internet. A popular Internet joke goes like this. One Bengali is a poet, two Bengalis are a film society, three Bengalis are a political party and four Bengalis are two political parties! One common stereotype is that Bongs are invariably fish eaters and often referred to as Machher Jhol, literally meaning fish curry in Bengali. Bengali women are stereotyped as having big round eyes. Filmmaker Jag Mundhra believed that Bengali women have big round eyes.

== See also ==
- Bongal
- Madrassi
