= Kakoli Furniture =

Viral Internet meme

An internet meme about Kakoli Furniture, featuring ACP Pradyuman and Inspector Daya of CID

In May 2021, a video advertisement of Kakoli Furniture, a shop situated in Gazipur, Bangladesh, went viral. The video became source of internet memes in which Kakoli Furniture was placed in many humorous contexts. The popularity of the memes about Kakoli Furniture resulted in increase of sales of its products.

== Background ==
Kakoli Furniture, a furniture store, was opened a decade ago. Its slogan was "Dame kom mane bhalo, Kakoli Furniture" ("Less price but still better, Kakoli Furniture") chosen by son of the owner. For its marketing he created video ads. Kakoli Furniture posted its television advertisement in its Facebook page. The slogan was included at the end of the video. Another part of the video shows humorous conversation between a man and a woman.

== Memes ==
The advertisement became popular in Bangladesh and West Bengal. After the video went viral, netizens started making funny memes about it. Anik Dutta, film director in West Bengal, made another memes about Kakoli Furniture in Eastern Bengali language. Memes were made about Ranveer Singh, Sunny Leone, Mr. Bean, Shahrukh Khan, Johnny Sins and various persons stating that they use Kakoli Furniture.

== See also ==
- Murad Takla
- Maaltake Garite Tol
