= Malayalam-English =

Manglish or Malayalam-English is the code-switching between the Dravidian language Malayalam and English.
