= Banglish =

Blend of Bengali and English language spoken in South Asia

Banglish, also known as Bangreji (portmanteau of 'Bangla' and 'Īngrejī'), Benglish or Bengalish (portmanteau of 'Bengali' and 'English') and Bonglish, is code-switching or code-mixing of Bengali and English languages. The first usage of the word "Benglish" was found in 1972 and "Banglish" in 1975.

In written contexts, Benglish refers to Romanised Bengali—Bengali written in Roman script (English alphabet)—often with English lexical borrowings.

In academic circles, "Benglish verb" refers to a compound verb consisting of an English word and a Bengali verb, such as: "accident kora" (meaning "to be involved in an accident"), "in howa" (meaning "to enter"), "confuse kora" (meaning "to cause confusion"), and so on.

In 2012 to maintain the purity of the Bengali language, according to an order of the Bangladesh High Court, "Banglish" was banned in all media including TV and radio in Bangladesh.

The earliest instance of a long Bengali text printed in the Roman script was a collection of Aesop's Fables titled Oriental Fabulist, published in 1803 in six Indian languages. During 1930s Suniti Kumar Chatterji suggested that Bengali be written in Roman script to eliminate spelling inconsistencies and to appeal to a pan-Indian audience. In Kolkata, West Bengal, India some publishers have begun releasing classical and children's books in the Roman script (i.e., English alphabet) to cater to readers who speak Bengali but are unfamiliar with the Bengali alphabet. Remarkably, these "Benglish books" became the third highest-selling book category of a publisher's sales chart at the Kolkata Book Fair in 2018.

== See also ==
- Murad Takla
- Bong (term)
- Romanization of Bengali

== Sources ==
- Tahereen, Tanzina (May 2016). "Banglish: Code-switching and Contact Induced Language Change in a Spoken Variety of Bangla". Spectrum: Journal of the Department of English. Dhaka: University of Dhaka: 143–164.
