= Cerner Enviza =

American healthcare company

- Type: Subsidiary
- Industry: Life sciences
- Founded: 2009
- Fate: Acquired by Cerner
- Successor: Cerner Enviza
- Headquarters: 3 World Trade Center, New York, United States
- Area served: Worldwide
- Key people: Lynnette Cooke (Global CEO)
- Products: CancerMPact; Claritis; EpiDatabase; National Health and Wellness Survey
- Number of employees: 600

Cerner Enviza is an American healthcare company that provides data, analytics, and research to the life sciences industry, with a particular focus on oncology and rare diseases.

Kantar Health was acquired by Bain Capital in 2019, which sold it to the Cerner Corporation on April 1, 2021, and was subsequently renamed Cerner Enviza.

== History ==
=== Founding ===
Kantar Health was established in 2009 when Kantar Group restructured, following the acquisition of TNS in 2008. It is one of four dedicated vertical sector operating units. It combined the TNS Healthcare, Ziment Group, Consumer Health Sciences, and MattsonJack Group businesses to create a healthcare research, insight, and consulting specialist to sit alongside Kantar Media, Kantar Retail, and Kantar Worldpanel.

=== Acquisitions ===
HCI (ACNielsen HCI), a research organization focused on healthcare promotions, moved to Kantar Health in 2010 after its acquisition by WPP in 2008.

In 2014 Kantar Health acquired Evidências (Focus Assistência Médica S/S Ltda. and Classe Assistência Médica S/S Ltda.), a healthcare research company based in Brazil. Evidências specializes in “Evidence-based, health management services” and operates in all segments of the Brazilian healthcare market, including health insurance, government bodies, hospitals and providers, and pharmaceutical and medical device manufacturers. It was one of three Brazilian agencies acquired by WPP in as many weeks.

In 2015 Kantar Health acquired CEEOR, a research and consulting company in the Czech Republic. CEEOR specializes in analytical services to pharmaceutical, biotechnology, and healthcare industries, largely focusing on developing late-phase research, such as Phase IV therapeutic use studies. These employ CEEOR's proprietary electronic data capture software, ELQE. In 2019, Kantar Health sold its stake in Cerner Enviza.

== Organization ==
=== Structure ===
Cerner Enviza has more than 600 employees in Asia, Australia, Europe, and North and South America.

== Research and data ==
Research by Cerner Enviza is cited in more than 400 scientific and peer-reviewed journals.

=== Notable Research ===
Addressing Sample Size Challenges in Linked Data Through Data Fusion: explores the use of neural networks and machine learning to enable integrated analysis of clinical and patient-derived data in diseases where the sample size is small.

The Healthcare Professionals’ Perspective on Impact and Actions Taken Following Severe Infusion Reaction Events in Oncology Centers in Europe: Pioneers real-world qualitative research methodologies to understand stakeholder attitudes, decisions, and preferences in more detail.

Patient and Oncology Nurse Preferences for the Treatment Options in Advanced Melanoma: A Discrete Choice Experiment: Explores the trade-offs and risks stakeholders are willing to accept as well as the perceived benefits of treatment in melanoma.

Real-World Cost Difference in Patients with Psoriasis Newly Initiating Apremilast vs. Biologic Treatment After Conventional Systemic Therapy: A retrospective analysis of German Sickness Funds that won a blue ribbon award at ISPOR Copenhagen, 2019.

Evaluation of Treatment Patterns of Fabry Disease Utilizing Medical Claims Analysis: A database analysis of German Sickness Funds.

=== Data and analytics ===
Cerner Enviza owns several proprietary data sources and was an early adopter of clinical and patient-reported data integration, presenting regularly at industry events on these topics.

National Health and Wellness Survey are considered the largest database of nationally projectable, patient-reported information regarding health. It is available in 12 countries.

Oncology Data Sources: CancerMPact, Cancerology provides a detailed analysis of patient segments, treatment patterns, and the competitive landscape for global oncology markets.

EpiDatabase: An epidemiology database that covers more than 190 indications in major healthcare markets around the world. It is used by 16 of the top 20 global pharmaceutical companies, as defined by Pharmaceutical Executive magazine in 2010.

Clarity: Claritas links patient-reported outcomes, claims, and electronic health records for integrated analysis at a patient level for multiple diseases.
