= National Food Survey (India) =

The National Food Survey is a syndicated, multi-year study of food habits and consumption across urban India, conducted bi-annually by IMRB International. The last round of the National Food Survey was conducted in September 2007.

NFS is one of the most comprehensive studies in terms of categories, and information coverage, providing baseline information on food purchase behavior. The Food survey collects information on 55 varied product categories ranging from breakfast cereals to ready-to-eat foods and provides a range of information on variables such as category penetration, frequency of purchase, trial and usage of brands and barriers to adoption of certain food categories. The study also captures information on media, demographic, and kitchen related variables.

The Food Survey is not to be confused with a similarly named government social survey conducted by the British government. Unlike the British National Food Survey it does not provide information for economic planning, and is primarily a research tool for food marketers.
