= Tanglish =

Mixing of Tamil and English languages

- Thanglish
- Region: Tamil Nadu, SE Asia, North America
- Ethnicity: Tamil
- Language family: mixed Tamil–English: Tanglish
- Writing system: Latin

Language codes
- ISO 639-3: None (mis)

Tanglish refers to the macaronic code-mixing or code-switching of the Tamil and English languages, in the context of colloquial spoken language. In the context of colloquial written language, Tanglish refers to the transliteration of Tamil text in English alphabet (Roman Tamil), with extensive usage of English vocabulary.

The name is a portmanteau of Tamil and English, and has taken various forms over time. The earliest form is Tamilish (dating from 1972), then Tinglish (1974), Tamglish (1991), Tamlish (1993), Thanglish (1997), and Tanglish (1999).

Tanglish has become the de-facto style of Tamil spoken in urban areas of present-day Tamil Nadu as well as contemporary Tamil cinema, to the extent that even words that have native colloquial equivalents are often replaced with English words.

In modern day India, since English is perceived as the prestige language over Indian languages by common people, Tanglish subsequently is perceived as the high prestige variety (H) of spoken Tamil, while vernacular colloquial Tamil (without English influence) is considered low variety (L) of spoken Tamil.

== Characteristics ==
A study of code switching in everyday speech in Tamil Nadu found that English words are commonly inserted into sentences that otherwise follow Tamil syntax.

A characteristic of Tanglish or Tamil-English code-switching is the addition of Tamil affixes to English words. The sound "u" is added at the end of an English noun to create a Tamil noun form, as in "sound-u" and the words "girl-u heart-u black-u" in the lyrics of "Why This Kolaveri Di". English nouns often are combined with Tamil case markers, as in "journey-ai" (accusative case), "driver-kku" (dative case, used to mean "for the driver"), and "teacher-oḍa" (of the teacher, genitive case). Verbs and some nouns from the English language are converted to Tamil verb forms by adding Tamil verbalizers that indicate verb mood. For example, the Tamil verb "paṇṇu" (imperative mood "do") is added to the English verb "drive", resulting in "drive paṇṇu", used to mean "do the driving". Another pattern that has been noted by speakers or observers of Tanglish is the addition of the syllable "-fy" at the end of a Tamil word (e.g., maatti-fy, Kalaachi-fy).

=== Examples ===
The below examples show how code-mixing is done with English in Spoken Tamil. In terms of vocabulary, the major differences between formal, colloquial and anglicised Tamil is that, formal Tamil tends to draw most of its vocabulary from Pure Tamil (செந்தமிழ், inspired from Old Tamil), colloquial Tamil (கொடுந்தமிழ்) has significant number of loanwords from Prakrit & Sanskrit, and Tanglish replaces a large amount of nouns and verbs with English words.

Comparison of Tamil Registers
S.No.	English (ஆங்கிலம்)	Formal Tamil (எழு‌த்து வழ‌க்கு)	Colloquial Tamil (பேச்சு வழக்கு)	Tanglish (தமிங்கிலம்)
1	Open the tap and wash your hands.	குழாயைத் திறந்து உங்கள் கைகளைக் கழுவுங்கள்.	கொழாய தொறந்து உங்க கைய கழுவுங்க.	Tap-அ open பண்ணி handwash பண்ணுங்க.
2	Don't forget to take your book and pen to the school.	உன்னுடைய பாடநூலையும் எழுதுகோலையும் பள்ளிக்கு எடுத்துச் செல்ல மறக்காதே.	உன்னோட புஸ்தகத்தயும் பேனாவையும் பள்ளிக்கூடத்துக்கு எடுத்துட்டு போக மறக்காத.	உன் book-ஐயும் pen-ஐயும் miss பண்ணாம school-உக்கு எடுத்துட்டு போ.
3	Farmers faced loss this year.	இவ்வாண்டு உழவர்கள் இழப்பைச் சந்தித்தனர்.	இந்த வருஷம் விவசாயிங்களுக்கு நஷ்டம் ஆச்சு.	இந்த year farmers-க்கு loss ஆச்சு.
4	Sun rises in the east.	கதிரவன் கிழக்கில் தோன்றுவான்.	சூரியன் கெழக்குல உதிக்கும்.	Sun east-ல rise ஆகும்.
5	Please just open the door and take your food.	தயவுசெய்து கதவை மட்டும் திறந்து உங்கள் உணவை எடுத்துக்கொள்ளுங்கள்.	தயவுசெஞ்சு கதவ மட்டும் தொறந்து உங்க சாப்பாட்ட எடுத்துக்கோங்க.	Just-உ door-அ open பண்ணி உங்க food-அ எடுத்துக்கோங்க please.
6	I couldn't sleep all night.	இரவு முழுவதும் எனக்கு தூக்கம் வரவில்லை.	ராத்திரி பூராவும் எனக்கு தூக்கம் வரல.	Night-உ full-ஆ எனக்கு தூக்கம் வரல.

== Distribution ==
=== Tamil Nadu ===
The use of Tanglish is common in Chennai, possibly due in part to the use of English in education. The influx of speakers of other languages (such as Telugu, Gujarati, and Kannada) to the city has also increased the importance of English as the lingua franca. In The Hindu in 2010, a student in Chennai told of the widespread use of Tanglish by teenagers in her city. She said Tanglish was "something almost every teenager in Chennai uses", but noted that her mother said Tanglish was "murdering the [Tamil] language". That same year, a Tamil teacher in a matriculation school in Chennai reported that few of her students had a large enough Tamil vocabulary to be able to speak Tamil without including some words of English.

Tanglish is increasingly used in advertising aimed at consumers in Tamil Nadu, particularly for promotion of international products. For example, Pepsi has mixed English with Tamil in its slogan "ullam kekkuthae more". In 2004, The Hindu commented on a mobile phone advertising campaign in Chennai that used slogans that combined Tamil and English, such as "Konjam Samaiyal... Konjam Serial" and "Konjam Advice... Konjam Udaans". It also is common for advertising to use the Tamil language rendered in the English alphabet, a trend that leads to concern that people are losing the ability to read Tamil script.

The Tanglish lyrics of the film song "Why This Kolaveri Di", which went viral on Internet social networking sites in November 2011, have been identified as a factor in the song's popularity.

=== Tamil diasporas ===
Use of Tanglish has been reported among Tamil-speaking immigrant populations in Malaysia and Canada, particularly by young people. Singaporean rapper Yung Raja is known for his extensive use of Tanglish in his lyrics.

== See also ==
- Indian English
- Regional differences and dialects in Indian English
- Madras Bashai, a related, but distinct, language variant, a slang form of Tamil used in Chennai that is a blend of Tamil with Indian English, Telugu and Hindustani
