= SEC classification =

Classification of consumers

The SEC classification is the classification of consumers on the basis of parameters. Traditionally the two parameters used to categorize consumers were occupation and education of the chief wage earner (head) of the households. The SEC classification, created in 1988, was ratified by Market Research Society of India (MRSI), is used by most media researchers and brand managers to understand the Indian consuming class. Originally developed by IMRB International as a way of understanding market segments, and consumer behavior it was standardized and adopted by the Market Research Society of India in the mid-1980s as a measure of socio-economic class and is now commonly used as a market segmentation tool in India.

In the older version, the SEC classification consists of two grids-

- The urban SEC grid, which uses education levels and occupational criteria of the chief wage earner (CWE) of a household as measures to determine socio-economic classification, and segments urban India into 7 groups (A1 to E2) and
- The rural SEC grid, which uses education and type of house (pucca, semi-pucca, and kaccha) as measures of socio-economic class, and segments rural India into 4 groups (R1, R2, R3, R4)

This is based on the assumption that higher education leads to higher income thus higher consuming potential. But that this may not always be true. A trader or a retailer with no qualification can earn more income than a post-graduate executive, but SEC will categorize the traders/retailers not as SEC A1or A2.

In order to combat this problem, the Government came up with the new SEC system on 3 May 2011.

The new SEC system is based on two variables:

1. Education of the chief earner. The options are illiterate, literate but no formal schooling or schooling unto 4 years, schooling between 5–9 years, high school pass, some college (including a diploma but not a graduate), graduate / post-graduate (general), graduate / post-graduate (professional)
2. The number of consumer durables (pre-decided from a list of 11 items) owned by the family. The list of 11 items are: electricity connection, ceiling fan, LPG stove, two wheeler, color TV, refrigerator, washing machine, personal computer/laptop, car/jeep/van, air conditioner, agricultural land

There are 12 grades in the new system starting from A1 to E3.

These grids are used to determine the consumption preferences, and purchasing power of households, and are common tools used by social and business researchers working in India. The SEC grid does not use family income levels as a measure as this data is hard to collect and it has been demonstrated that education levels and occupation criteria in India are better determinants of consumer preference. The methodology used in these tools differs from the Household Potential Index, which measures consumption intensity.

== Urban grid ==
Skilled Workers	E2	E1	D	C	C	B2	B2
Petty traders	E2	D	D	C	C	B1	B2
Shop Owners	D	D	C	B2	B1	A2	A2
Businessmen with No employees	D	C	B2	B1	A2	A2	A1
Businessmen with 1-9 employees	C	B2	B2	B1	A2	A1	A4
Businessmen with 10+ employees	B1	B1	A2	A	A1	A1	A1
Self Employed professional	D	D	D	B	B	A	A
Clerical/Salesman	D	D	D	C	B2	B	B
Supervisory Level	D	D	C	C	B2	B1	A2
Officers/Executives-Junior	C	C	C	B2	B1	A2	A2
Officers/Executives-Mid/Senior	B1	B1	B1	B1	A2	A1	A1

It divides the population into 3 classes:

- Upper most segment of the consuming class-A1, A2 and B1
- Middle segment- B2 and C
- The lower most segment—D, E1, and E2..
