= Kanglish =

Kannada–English hybrid spoken in India

Kanglish (Kannada: ಕಂಗ್ಲಿಷ್ ISO 15919: kaṁgliṣ) is a term used to refer to the macaronic language of Kannada and English. It contains words borrowed from both Kannada and English. Kanglish began to develop in the mid-1990s.

== Etymology ==
The word "Kanglish" is a portmanteau of the names of the two languages Kannada and English, and was first recorded in 1993. Other less common terms are Kannalish (recorded from 2000), Kannadlish (2006), and Kanlish (2009).

Kanglish has become an important medium of communication in the Indian state of Karnataka.

== Features ==
Kanglish has some distinguishing features with regard to the nature of words borrowed from English. One of this is the addition of the suffix '-u' at the end of the word, as in heart-u, life-u, car-u, etc.

Since this is a spoken language, the Kannada is mostly 'ādubhāshe' . It includes the deletion of the 'a' and 'u' suffix for Kannada words, to make pronunciation faster.

The phonology of the word is also modified to suit the phonetic structure of Kannada. For example, the word "sir" is usually rendered as sār or sār-u.

== Examples ==
1. Yēn(u) samācāra, sār(u)?
  What's the matter, sir?
2. Helō, ṭifin (ā/a/i)yitā?
  Hello, have you had your tiffin (breakfast)?
3. Svalpa mūv māḍi.
  Just move a bit.
4. Svalpa brēk hāki.
  Please apply the brake.
5. Yāv(a) mūvi hākid(ā/a)re?
  Which movie (are they) playing?
6. Yāv(a) ḍākyumeṇṭri nōḍtāidirā?
  What documentary are you watching?
7. Yēn(u) kel(a)sa māḍtāidirā kampyootar jote, Varḍ-(i)nalli?
  What work are you doing in Word in the computer?
