= India Human Development Survey =

The India Human Development Survey (IHDS) 2005 is a nationally representative, multi-topic survey of 41,554 households in 1,503 villages and 971 urban neighborhoods across India. Two one-hour interviews in each household covered topics concerning health, education, employment, economic status, marriage, fertility, gender relations, and social capital. Children aged 8-11 completed short reading, writing, and arithmetic tests. Additional village, school, and medical facility interviews are also available.

Two follow up surveys wewre conducted, with Wave 2 conducted in 2011-12 and Wave 3 in 2022-23, with over 37000 households being interviewed at each of three waves, as well as several thousand new households to refresh the sample. This makes the IHDS unique in India as a large-scale survey where results from three time periods can be directly compared.

This survey was designed by Professors Sonalde Desai and Reeve Vanneman from University of Maryland and researchers from the National Council of Applied Economic Research and funded by the National Institute of Health. Results from this survey are summarized in a book titled Human Development in India: Challenges for a Society in Transition, published in 2010 by the Oxford University Press.
