= List of dialects of English =

Dialects are linguistic varieties that may differ in pronunciation, vocabulary, spelling, and other aspects of grammar. For the classification of varieties of the language, English, in pronunciation only, see regional accents of English.

Dialects can be defined as "sub-forms of languages which are, in general, mutually comprehensible." English speakers from different countries and regions use a variety of accents (systems of pronunciation), and local words and grammatical constructions, and from these factors various dialects can be differentiated. Dialects can be classified at broad or narrow levels: within a broad national or regional dialect, localised sub-dialects can be identified. The combination of differences in pronunciation and use of local words may make some English dialects almost unintelligible to speakers from other regions without any prior exposure.

The major native dialects of English are often divided by linguists into three general categories: the British Isles dialects, those of North America, and those of Australasia. Dialects can be associated not only with place but also with particular social groups. Within a given English-speaking country, there is a form of the language considered to be Standard English: the Standard Englishes of different countries differ and can themselves be considered dialects. Standard English is often associated with the more educated layers of society as well as more formal registers.

Standard British and Standard American English are the reference norms for English as spoken, written, and taught in the rest of the world, excluding countries in which English is spoken natively such as Australia, Canada, New Zealand, South Africa, Singapore and Ireland. In many former British Empire countries in which English is not spoken natively, British English forms are closely followed, alongside numerous American English usages that have become widespread throughout the English-speaking world. Conversely, a number of countries with historical ties to the United States tend to follow American English conventions. Many of these countries, while retaining strong British English or American English influences, have developed their own unique dialects, which include Indian English and Philippine English.

Chief among other native English dialects are Canadian English and Australian English, which rank third and fourth in the number of native speakers. For the most part, Canadian English, while featuring numerous British forms, alongside indigenous Canadianisms, shares vocabulary, phonology and syntax with American English, which leads many to recognise North American English as an organic grouping of dialects. Australian English, likewise, shares many British English usages, alongside plentiful features unique to Australia, and retains a significantly higher degree of distinctiveness from both larger varieties than does Canadian English. South African English, New Zealand English and Irish English are also distinctive and rank fifth, sixth, and seventh in the number of native speakers.

== Europe ==
English language in Europe

Dialects and accents of English spoken in the British Isles

=== Great Britain ===
- British English

==== England ====
English language in England:

- Standard English (Not to be confused with the accent Received Pronunciation)
- Northern
  - Lancastrian (Lancashire) and Cheshire
    - Bolton
    - Mancunian (Manchester)
    - Scouse (Merseyside)
  - Cumbrian (Cumbria)
    - Barrovian (Barrow-in-Furness)
  - Northumbrian (Northumberland and County Durham)
    - Geordie (Tyneside)
    - Mackem (Sunderland)
    - Pitmatic (Great Northern Coalfield)
  - Smoggie (Teesside)
  - Yorkshire
- East Midlands
  - Lincolnshire
- West Midlands
  - Black Country
  - Brummie (Birmingham)
  - Potteries (north Staffordshire)
  - Coventry
- East Anglian
  - Norfolk
  - Suffolk
  - Essex
- Southern
  - Cockney (working-class London and surrounding areas)
  - Estuary
  - Received Pronunciation (middle-class London, Home Counties and Hampshire)
  - Multicultural London (London)
  - Sussex
- West Country
  - Cornwall
  - Bristolian
  - Dorset
  - Janner (Plymouth)

==== Scotland ====
- Scottish English comprising varieties based on the Standard English of England.
  - Glasgow
  - Highland English

==== Wales ====
- Welsh English
  - Abercraf
  - Cardiff
  - Gower
  - Port Talbot

==== Non-geographic based English ====
- Angloromani
- Brogue

=== British dependencies and territories ===
- Channel Islands: Channel Island English
- Isle of Man: Manx English
- Gibraltar: Gibraltarian English
- Saint Helena, Ascension and Tristan da Cunha: South Atlantic English

=== Ireland ===
- Hiberno-English (Irish English)
  - Ulster
    - Ulster Scots dialect (contested)
  - Leinster
    - Dublin
      - Dublin 4 (D4)
  - South-West Ireland
- Extinct
  - Yola language (also known as Forth and Bargy dialect), thought to have been a descendant of Middle English, spoken in County Wexford
  - Fingallian, another presumed descendant of Middle English, spoken in Fingal

=== Continental Europe ===
- Euro English
  - English in Denmark
  - English in Finland
  - English in Germany
  - English in the Netherlands
  - English in Norway
  - English in Spain
  - English in Sweden

==== European interlanguages ====
- Czenglish
- Danglish
- Dunglish
- Finglish
- Franglais
- Denglisch
- Greekglish
- Hunglish
- Itanglese
- Ponglish
- Estonglish
- Porglish/Portuglish
- Siculish
- Spanglish
- Llanito
- Swenglish
- Runglish
  - Solombala English

=== Mediterranean ===
- English in Cyprus
- Maltese English

== North America ==
=== United States ===
Interactive map of American English

American English:

- Cultural and ethnic American English
  - African American English
    - African-American Vernacular English
  - Cajun Vernacular English
  - General American: the "standard" or "mainstream" spectrum of American English
  - Latino (Hispanic) Vernacular Englishes
    - Chicano English (Mexican-American English)
    - Miami English
    - New York Latino English
  - Pennsylvania Dutch English
  - Yeshiva English
  - American Indian English
    - Lumbee English
- Regional and local American English
  - Northern American English
    - Inland Northern English: Chicago, Cleveland, Detroit, Milwaukee, Western New York, the Lower Peninsula of Michigan, and most of the U.S. Great Lakes region
    - New England English
      - Eastern New England English (including Boston and Maine English)
        - Rhode Island English
      - Western New England English: Connecticut, Hudson Valley, western Massachusetts, and Vermont
    - North-Central (Upper Midwestern) English: northern Wisconsin, northern Minnesota, North Dakota, Montana
  - Metropolitan New York English
  - Southeast Super-Regional English
    - Midland American English
      - North Midland English: Iowa City, Omaha, Lincoln, Columbia, Springfield, Muncie, Columbus, etc.
      - South Midland English: Oklahoma City, Tulsa, Topeka, Wichita, Kansas City, St. Louis (in transition), Decatur, Indianapolis, Cincinnati, Dayton, etc.
    - High Tider English: traditional dialect of the Chesapeake Bay, Tangier, Ocracoke, the Outer Banks, Virginia Barrier Islands, etc.
    - New Orleans English
    - Philadelphia English
      - Baltimore English
    - Southern American English
      - Southern Appalachian English: Linden, Birmingham, Chattanooga, Knoxville, Asheville, and Greenville
      - Texan English: Lubbock, Odessa, and Dallas
      - Tennessean English: Nashville, Murfreesboro, Memphis
  - Western American English
    - California English
    - Pacific Northwest English
  - Western Pennsylvania (Pittsburgh) English
- Extinct or near-extinct American English
  - Boontling
  - "Good American Speech": Mid-Atlantic or Transatlantic English
  - Elite Northeastern American English
  - Older Southern American English
- American English-based hybrid languages (creoles or pidgins)
  - Afro-Seminole Creole
  - Gullah language/Sea Island Creole English, South-East US related to Bahamian creole
  - Hawaiian Pidgin

=== Canada ===
Interactive map of Canadian English

Canadian English:

- Aboriginal English in Canada
  - Bungi of the Canadian Metis people of British descent
- Atlantic Canadian English
  - Lunenburg English
  - Newfoundland English
- Greater Toronto English
- Ottawa Valley English
- Quebec English
- Standard Canadian English
- Southern British Columbia English

== Caribbean, Central, and South America ==
=== Caribbean ===
- Caribbean English

=== Antigua and Barbuda ===
- Antiguan and Barbudan English
  - Antiguan and Barbudan Creole

=== The Bahamas ===
- Bahamian English
  - Bahamian Creole

=== Barbados ===
- Bajan English
  - Bajan Creole

=== Belize ===
- Belizean English
  - Belizean Creole

=== Bermuda ===
- Bermudian English

=== Cayman Islands ===
- Cayman Islands English

=== Colombia ===
- San Andrés–Providencia English

=== Costa Rica ===
- Limonese Creole

=== Dominican Republic ===
- Samaná English

=== Falkland Islands ===
- Falkland Islands English

=== Guyana ===
- Guyanese English
  - Guyanese Creole

=== Honduras ===
- Bay Islands English

=== Jamaica ===
- Jamaican English
  - Jamaican Patois

=== Nicaragua ===
- Miskito Coast Creole
  - Rama Cay Creole

=== Panama ===
- Bocas del Toro Creole

=== Puerto Rico ===
- Puerto Rican English
- Virgin Islands Creole

=== Saba ===
- Saban English

=== Saint Vincent and the Grenadines ===
- Vincentian English
  - Vincentian Creole
  - Iyaric

=== Trinidad and Tobago ===
- Trinidadian and Tobagonian English
  - Tobagonian Creole
  - Trinidadian Creole

=== Turks and Caicos Islands ===
- Turks and Caicos Creole

=== Virgin Islands ===
- Virgin Islands Creole

== Asia ==
=== Bangladesh ===
- Bangladeshi English (Benglish or Banglish)
- Banglish

=== Brunei ===
- Brunei English

=== Cambodia ===
- Cambodian English

=== China ===
- Chinese Pidgin English (Extinct)
- Chinglish

==== Hong Kong ====
- Hong Kong English

=== India ===
Indian English:

- Standard Indian English
  - Indian English: the "standard" English used by government administration, it derives from the British Indian Empire.
  - Butler English: (also Bearer English or Kitchen English), once an occupational dialect, now a social dialect.
- Regional and local Indian English
  - East Region: Odia English, Bhojpuriya English, Assamese English, Bengali English, North-East Indian English etc.
  - West Region: Gujarati English, Maharashtrian English etc.
  - North Region: Hindustani English (Hinglish), Delhi/Punjabi English, Rajasthani English etc.
  - South Region: Telugu English (Tenglish), Kannada English (Kanglish), Tamil English (Tanglish), Malayali English etc.

=== Israel ===
- Heblish
- Yeshivish

=== Japan ===
- English in Japan
- Engrish

=== Myanmar (Burma) ===
- Burmese/Myanmar English

=== Korea ===
- Korean English

=== Malaysia ===
- Malaysian English
- Manglish

=== Maldives ===
- Maldivian English

=== Middle East ===
- Arablish

=== Nepal ===
- Nepali English

=== Pakistan ===
- Pakistani English
- Urdish

=== Philippines ===
- Philippine English
- Taglish
- Bislish

=== Singapore ===
- Singapore English
- Singlish

=== Sri Lanka ===
- Sri Lankan English

=== Thailand ===
- Tinglish

== Africa ==
=== Cameroon ===
- Cameroonian English

=== Eswatini ===
- Swazi English

=== Ethiopia ===
- Ethiopian English

=== The Gambia ===
- Gambian English

=== Ghana ===
- Ghanaian English

=== Kenya ===
- Kenyan English

=== Lesotho ===
- Lesotho English

=== Liberia ===
- Liberian English
- Merico language

=== Malawi ===
- Malawian English

=== Namibia ===
- Namlish

=== Nigeria ===
- Nigerian English

=== Rwanda ===
- Rwandan English

=== Sierra Leone ===
- Sierra Leonean English

=== South Africa ===
- South African English: Black South African English, White South African English, Indian South African English etc.
  - Cape Flats English
  - Xhosa English

=== South Atlantic ===
- South Atlantic English spoken on Tristan da Cunha and Saint Helena

=== Tanzania ===
- Tanzanian English

=== Uganda ===
- Ugandan English

=== Zambia ===
- Zambian English

=== Zimbabwe ===
- Zimbabwean English

== Oceania ==
=== Australia ===
- Australian English
- General Australian: Broad Australian, Cultivated, Mediterranean accent etc.
  - Australian Aboriginal English
  - South Australian English
  - Western Australian English
  - Torres Strait English

=== Fiji ===
- Fiji English

=== New Zealand ===
- New Zealand English: Māori English, Pasifika English, Southland accent, West Coast Irish Catholic accent, Taranaki accent etc.

=== Palau ===
- Palauan English

=== Papua New Guinea ===
- Papuan Pidgin English

== Others ==
- Learning English
- Simplified Technical English

== Antarctica ==
- Antarctic English

== See also ==
- American English regional vocabulary
  - North American English regional phonology
- Commonwealth English
- History of the English language
  - Old English
  - Middle English
  - Early Modern English
  - Modern English
- Contact languages
  - English-based creole languages
  - List of English-based pidgins
  - English macaronic languages
- English-based argots
- Regional accents of English
- World Englishes
- Controlled English languages
  - Globish & Parallel English
  - Attempto Controlled English
  - Basic English
  - Plain English
  - Seaspeak
  - Specialized English
  - E-prime
- Linguistic purism in English
- Schneider's dynamic model
- Survey of English Dialects
- Natural language processing
  - ClearTalk
  - Inform 7
