= Arabizi =

Romanized Arabic alphabet

The Arabic chat alphabet, also known as Arabizi, Arabeezi, Arabeezy, Arabish, Franco-Arabic or simply Franco (from French: franco-arabe) refers to the romanized alphabets for informal Arabic dialects in which Arabic script is transcribed or encoded into a combination of Latin script and Western Arabic numerals. These informal chat alphabets were originally used primarily by youth in the Arab world in very informal settings—especially for communicating over the Internet or for sending messages via cellular phones—though use is not necessarily restricted by age anymore and these chat alphabets have been used in other media such as advertising.

These chat alphabets differ from more formal and academic Arabic transliteration systems, in that they use numerals and multigraphs instead of diacritics for letters such as ṭāʾ (ط) or ḍād (ض) that do not exist in the basic Latin script (ASCII), and in that what is being transcribed is an informal dialect and not Standard Arabic. These Arabic chat alphabets also differ from each other, as each is influenced by the particular phonology of the Arabic dialect being transcribed and the orthography of the dominant European language in the area—typically the language of the former colonists, and typically either French or English.

Because of their widespread use, including in public advertisements by large multinational companies, large players in the online industry like Google and Microsoft have introduced tools that convert text written in Arabish to Arabic (Google Translate and Microsoft Translator). Add-ons for Mozilla Firefox and Chrome also exist (Panlatin and ARABEASY Keyboard). The Arabic chat alphabet is never used in formal settings and is rarely, if ever, used for long communications.

== Name ==
The word Arabizi (Arabic: عربيزي, romanized: 'Arabīziyy) is a portmanteau of the words "English" (Arabic: انجليزي, romanized: Inglīziyy) and "Arabic" (Arabic: عربي, romanized: 'Arabīyy).

== History ==
During the last decades of the 20th century, Western text-based communication technologies, such as mobile phone text messaging, the World Wide Web, email, bulletin board systems, IRC, and instant messaging became increasingly prevalent in the Arab world. Most of these technologies originally permitted the use of the Latin script only, and some still lack support for displaying Arabic script. As a result, Arabic-speaking users frequently transliterate Arabic text into Latin script when using these technologies to communicate. To handle those Arabic letters that do not have an approximate phonetic equivalent in the Latin script, numerals and other characters were appropriated known as "code switching". For example, the numeral "3" is used to represent the Arabic letter ⟨ع⟩ (ʿayn)—note the choice of a visually similar character, with the numeral resembling a mirrored version of the Arabic letter. Many users of mobile phones and computers use Arabish even though their system is capable of displaying Arabic script. This may be due to a lack of an appropriate keyboard layout for Arabic, or because users are already more familiar with the QWERTY or AZERTY keyboard layout.

Online communication systems, such as IRC, bulletin board systems, and blogs, are often run on systems or over protocols that do not support code pages or alternate character sets. Thus, the Arabic chat alphabet has become commonplace. It can be seen even in domain names, like Qal3ah.

According to one 2020 paper based on a survey done in and around Nazareth, there is now "a high degree of normativization or standardisation in Arabizi orthography." In a similar vein, a 2025 mixed-methods study of Jordanian social-media conversations examined Arabic–English code-mixing found that English elements are most often inserted into otherwise Arabic utterances rather than involving full alternation between the two languages; the authors linked this pattern to factors such as social status, prestige, globalization, technological developments (including AI), and education level.

== Comparison table ==
Because of the informal nature of this system, there is no single "correct" or "official" usage. There may be some overlap in the way various letters are transliterated.

Most of the characters in the system make use of the Latin character (as used in English and French) that best approximates phonetically the Arabic letter that one would otherwise use (for example, ب corresponds to b). Regional variations in the pronunciation of an Arabic letter can also produce some variation in its transliteration (e.g. ﺝ might be transliterated as j by a speaker of the Levantine dialect, or as g by a speaker of the Egyptian dialect).

Those letters that do not have a close phonetic approximation in the Latin script are often expressed using numerals or other characters, so that the numeral graphically approximates the Arabic letter that one would otherwise use (e.g. ع is represented using the numeral 3 because it looks like a mirror image).

Since many letters are distinguished from others solely by a dot above or below the main portion of the character, the transliterations of these letters frequently use the same letter or number with an apostrophe added before or after (e.g. '3 is used to represent غ).

Name	Letter	Arabic chat alphabet	IPA
Hamza	أ إ آ ء ئ ؤ	2	ʔ
ʾAlif	ا	a æ e è^{[1]}	æ(ː) a(ː) ɑ(ː) ɛ(ː) ɐ
Bāʾ	ب	b p	b p
Tāʾ	ت	t	t t̪ tˢ
Thāʾ	ث	s th þ t^{[11]}	s θ
Jīm	ج	j, g, dj^{[1]}, gi (gia, ge, gi, gio, giu), ż, ž, g/gh, dsch, ssch (ʒ)	ʒ d͡ʒ ɟ ɟ͡ʝ ɡ
Ḥāʾ	ح	7 h^{[7]} ħ	ħ ʜ
Khāʾ	خ	j kh 7' 5	x χ
Dāl	د	d	d d̪
Dhāl	ذ	z th th' dh ð d^{[11]}	z ð
Rāʾ	ر	r	ɾ r rˤ
Zāy	ز	z	z
Sīn	س	s	s
Shīn	ش	sh, ch^{[1]}, $^{[6]}, x^{[14]}, ș, ş, š, sci (scia, sce, sci, scio, sciu), sch	ʃ
Ṣād	ص	s 9 S	sˤ sˠ
Ḍād	ض	d dh 9' D^{[8]}	dˤ d̪ˤ d̪ˠ
Ṭāʾ	ط	t 6 T^{[8]}	tˤ t̪ˤ t̪ˠ
Ẓāʾ	ظ	z th dh 6' Ð Th' Dh	zˤ ðˤ ðˠ
ʿAyn	ع	3^{[13]}	ʕ ʢ
Ghayn	غ	gh 3' 8^{[9]} ġ ğ	ɣ ʁ
Fāʾ	ف	f v	f v
Qāf	ق	2, g, q, 8^{[10]}, 9^{[10]}, g/gh	ʔ ɡ ɢ q
Kāf	ك	k g ch^{[12]} g/gh	k ɡ t͡ʃ
Lām	ل	l	l ɫ
Mīm	م	m	m
Nūn	ن	n	n
Hāʾ	ه	h a e ah eh é^{[1]}	h, /a e/
Tā' marbūṭa	ة	a e ah eh at et é^{[1]}	/a e at et/
Wāw	و	w o ou oo u	w o(ː) u(ː)
Yā	ي ى ^{[2]}	y, i, ee, ei, ai, a, é^{[1]}, å (ى)	j i(ː) e(ː), /a/

Additional letters	Arabic chat alphabet	IPA
پ	p	p
چ ^{[3]}	j, ch, tch, g, ci (cia, ce, ci, cio, ciu), ċ, č, g/gh, tsch, ssch (ʒ)	t͡ʃ ɡ ʒ
ڜ ^{[4]}	ch, tch, ci (cia, ce, ci, cio, ciu), ċ, č, tsch	t͡ʃ
ڤ ڥ ^{[5]}	v	v
ڨ گ ݣ ^{[5]}	g, g/gh (ga, ghe, ghi, go, gu)	ɡ

Vowels and others	Arabic chat alpabet	IPA
ا	a, æ, e, è, ā, ē	æ(ː) a(ː) ɑ(ː) ɛ(ː) ɐ
و	w, o, ou, oo, u, ū, ō	w o(ː) u(ː)
ي	y, i, ee, é, ī, ē	j i(ː) e(ː)
ى	a, å	a(ː)
ـَي	ay, ai, ă, ei	aj
ـَو	aw, au, ø	aw
ـِيّ	iyy	ijj
ـَس	as, æs, es, â, ê	æs as ɑs ɛs ɐs
ـِس	is, es, î, ê	is es ɛs
ـُس	us, os, û, ô	us os
تّ	tt, ț, ţ	tt
لّ	ll, ł	ll ɫ

The apostrophe ' can be used as an ʿayn ع or can used as a visual separator, for example: 3â'al/3asal, giâ'ad/jasad. Also can be used to differentiate between sounds that are written the same ex: from th /θ/ to th' /ð/

^1é, è, ch, and dj are most likely to be used in regions where French is the primary non-Arabic language. dj is especially used in Algerian Arabic.
^2Mainly in the Nile Valley, the final form is always ى (without dots), representing both final /i/ and /a/. It is the more traditional way of spelling the letter for both cases.
^3In Iraq, and sometimes in the Persian Gulf, this may be used to transcribe /t͡ʃ/. However, it is most often transcribed as if it were تش. In Egypt, it is instead used for transcribing /ʒ/ (which can be a reduction of /d͡ʒ/). In Israel, it is used to transcribe /ɡ/, as in "ﺭﻣﺎت ﭼﺎﻥ" (Ramat Gan) or "چيميل يافيت" (Gimel Yafit).
^4Only used in Morocco to transliterate Spanish /t͡ʃ/.
^5Depending on the region, different letters may be used for the same phoneme.
^6The dollar sign is only used in Jordan.
^7This use for h is also found in Morocco.
^8Capitalized D and T may be used in Lebanon.
^9The number 8 is used for /ɣ/ only in Lebanon.
^10Common in Saudi Arabia, may be less common in other places.
^11The letters t and d are used for the pronunciations /t, d/, respectively.
^12Used in a Palestinian dialect where the letter is sometimes pronounced /t͡ʃ/.
^13/ʕ/ rarely spelled ⟨a⟩ the same way names are commonly transcribed in official documents.
^14Used in Morocco.

== Examples ==
Each of the different varieties of Arabic chat alphabets is influenced by the particular phonology of the Arabic dialect being transcribed and the orthography of the dominant European language in the area—typically the language of the former colonists. Below are some examples of Arabic chat alphabet varieties.

=== Egyptian Arabic ===
The frequent use of y and w to represent ى and و demonstrates the influence of English orthography on the romanization of Egyptian Arabic.

Additionally, the letter qāf (ق) is usually pronounced as a glottal stop, like a hamza (ء) in Metropolitan (Cairene) Egyptian Arabic—unlike Standard Arabic in which it represents a voiceless uvular stop. Therefore, in Egyptian Arabizi, the numeral 2 can represent either a Hamza or a qāf pronounced as a glottal stop.

Egyptian Arabic	انا رايح الكليه الساعه 3	الجو عامل ايه النهارده فى إسكندريه؟
Arabic transcription	2anaa rayih lel koleya essa3 talataa.	l gaww 3amil é lnharda f eskendrya?
IPA	[ænæˈɾɑˑjeħ lilˈkullija (ʔe)sˈsæːʕæ tæˈlæːtæ]	[elˈɡæwwe ˈʕæːmel ˈe(ːhe)nnɑˈhɑɾdɑ feskendeˈɾejjæ]
English	I'm going to college at 3 pm.	How is the weather today in Alexandria?

=== Levantine Arabic ===
Levantine Arabic	كيف صحتك، شو قاعد تعمل؟
Arabic transcription	keef so7tak, shu 2a3ed bte3mal?
English	How is your health, what are you doing?

==== Palestinian Bedouin Arabic ====
The use of ch to represent ك (kāf) indicates one of the Negev Palestinian Arabic variant pronunciations of the letter in one of its subdialects, in which it is sometimes palatalized to [t͡ʃ] (as in English "chip"). Where this palatalization appears in other dialects, the Arabic letter is typically respelled to either تش or چ.

Palestinian Arabic	بخير الله إيسلمك شحالك إنتي
Arabic transcription	b7'air allah eysallemch. sh7aalech enty?
English	Fine, God bless you. How about you?

=== Moroccan Arabic ===
The use of ch to represent ش demonstrates the influence of French orthography on the romanization of Moroccan Arabic or Darija. French became the primary European language in Morocco as a result of French colonialism.

One of the characteristics of Franco-Arabic as it is used to transcribe Darija is the presence of long consonant clusters that are typically unorthodox in other languages. These clusters represents the deletion of short vowels and the syllabification of medial consonants in the phonology of Darija, a feature shared with and derived from Amazigh languages.

Moroccan Arabic	كيفاش داير فالقراية؟
Arabic transcription	kifach dayer fle9raya?
IPA	[kifæʃ dæjər fləqrˤɑja]
English	How are you doing with your studies?

=== Gulf Arabic ===
- Spoken along the Persian Gulf coasts of Kuwait, Bahrain, Qatar, Oman, UAE and eastern Saudi Arabia

Gulf Arabic	شلونك؟ شنو قاعد تسوي الحين؟
Arabic transcription	shlonik? Shnu ga3d tsawe al7een?
English	How are you? What are you doing right now?

=== Iraqi Arabic ===
- Baghdadi Arabic

Iraqi Arabic	عليمن يا گلُب تعتب عليمن؟
Arabic transcription	3alayman ya galb ti3tib 3alayman?
English	Who are you blaming, my heart, who?

=== Sudanese Arabic ===
Sudanese Arabic	والله مشتاق ليك شديد يا زول كيفك إنتا؟ انا الحمدلله اكنت داير امشى المحل داك جمب النيل، المكان قريب من بيتك. حاستناك فى الكبرى اتفقنا؟.
Arabic transcription	wallahi moshtag lik shadid ya zol kefak inta? ana alhamdolillah konta dayir amshi le al ma7al dak gamb al nil, al makan garib men betak. 7astanak fi al kubri. htafakna
English	Oh, God, I missed you a lot, man! How are you? Thank God. So I want to go to that one place near the Nile, the place near your very house! I'll wait for you at the bridge. deal??

=== Chadian Arabic ===
- Shuwa Arabic spoken in N'Djamena, Chad.

Chadian Arabic	بوه ياخي، إنت عفة؟ ولله سمح أنا ماشي لسوبرمارشة ديك بي وسط نجامينا لو تدور تمشي يعني، تعال معاي يلا ياخي.
Arabic transcription	Boh yakhi, inta afé? Wallah semeh, ana maché lê supermarché dik bi ousut n'djamena lô tidoura tamshi yani, ta'al maa'ai yalla yakhi.
English	Oh, hey, my brother. How are you? Good. I am going to that supermarket in downtown N'Djamena, so if you want to come, hurry and come with me, my brother!

== Criticism ==
The phenomenon of writing Arabic with these improvised chat alphabets has drawn sharp rebuke from a number of different segments of Arabic-speaking communities. While educators and members of the intelligentsia mourn the deterioration and degradation of the standard, literary, academic language, conservative Muslims, as well as pan-Arabists and some Arab nationalists, view the Arabic Chat Alphabet as a detrimental form of Westernization. Arabic chat alphabets emerged amid a growing trend among Arab youth, from Morocco to Iraq, to incorporate former colonial languages—especially English and French—into Arabic through code switching or as a form of slang. These improvised chat alphabets are used to replace Arabic script, and this raises concerns regarding the preservation of the quality of the language.

== See also ==
- Arablish
- Arabic alphabet
- Varieties of Arabic
- Arabic phonology
- Arabic transliteration
- Romanization of Syriac
- Arabist
- Fingilish, the same idea with Persian
- l33t
- Yamli, a tool for real time Arabic transliteration
- Greeklish, a similar phenomenon in Greek
- Maltese, a related standardized Semitic language written in Latin script
- Roman Urdu
