= Cluster reduction =

Simplification of consonant clusters in certain environments

In phonology and historical linguistics, cluster reduction is the simplification of consonant clusters in certain environments or over time. Cluster reduction can happen in different languages, dialects of those languages, in World Englishes, and as a part of language acquisition.

== Uses ==
=== Dialects of English ===
Different varieties of cluster reduction can be observed in numerous examples of English dialects around the world, including but not limited to New Zealand English, South Atlantic English, and African American Vernacular English (AAVE).

In some dialects of English such as African American Vernacular English, certain historical consonant clusters reduce to single consonants at the ends of words. That is common in words in which one of the final consonants is alveolar (/t/, /d/, /s/, /z/): friend rhymes with Ben, and cold is homophonous with coal. In both cases, a historical cluster of homorganic consonants loses a stop: /ˈfrɛn/, /ˈkoʊl/ However, in colder, where the consonant cluster falls between vowels, the /d/ remains: /ˈkoʊldɚ/. The similar word-final reduction of */mb/ to /m/ and */ŋɡ/ to /ŋ/ is complete in standard English (e.g. lamb, long), as it is in many other Germanic languages (e.g. Swedish lamm, lång).

In AAVE, this cluster reduction is the result of a phonological rule. In unambiguous situations, the clusters can be reduced without leaving the listener confused. For example, the rule implies that a speaker could say "eight cat," when referring to multiple cats, but not "the cat" when referring to multiple cats. The latter statement would result in ambiguity, and listeners may become confused and think that the speaker is talking about only one cat.

=== World languages ===
Italian is well known to have undergone cluster reduction, where stop clusters have become geminates. For example, Victoria has become Vittoria. In other words, articulation but not length has reduced. A similar occurrence is observed in Portuguese as well, but gemination is absent. Cluster reduction also takes place in Catalan, and in a similar way as it happens in English. Certain consonant clusters placed at the end of a word are reduced: cent /sen/ instead of /sent/. They recover, however, the reduced consonant when the cluster falls between vowels: centenar /səntəˈna/. The phenomenon does not exist in Valencian: cent /sent/ and centenar /senteˈnaɾ/.

Word-initial and word-final consonant clusters do not exist in the Japanese language. Therefore, an English-language learner from Japanese may find producing English words with such clusters to be troublesome. Common cluster simplification strategies include cluster reduction (e.g., string /stɹɪŋ/ → /sɹɪŋ/) and epenthesis (e.g., /stɹɪŋ/ → /stəɹɪŋ/), which describes vowel additions within, or at the end of, words.

=== World Englishes ===
Cluster reduction is common in specific languages, and it occurs in World Englishes as well. For example, final consonant cluster reduction is common among those speaking dialects of Singapore English, and they may use cluster reduction strategies known as metathesis, glottalization, and deletion. Clusters which have both /t/ and /k/ are usually reduced to [k]. As in Singapore English, speakers of Nigerian English may also reduce or delete their final consonant clusters. Strategies of cluster reduction common in Nigerian English include metathesis or epenthesis with the vowels /u/ or /i/. An example occurs in the word silk, which speakers Nigerian English may say /silik/ instead. Unlike Singapore English, /k/ and /t/ clusters are generally reduced to [t].

A common simplification process in Chicano English is word-final cluster simplification. For example, "ward" would sound like "war," and "start" would sound like "star." In Spanish, there is a sequential constraint, and /s/ clusters cannot occur at the beginning of a word. That constraint causes epenthesis of a vowel in a word before the beginning /s/ cluster to be common, such as in the words "school," "scare," and "spoon," which would sound like [iskul], [iskɛr], and [ispun], respectively.

=== Language acquisition ===
In first-language acquisition, children show similarities in the clusters that are reduced and to which consonant the clusters are reduced. Following are some common word-initial cluster reductions: Clusters including a fricative and a stop typically get reduced to the stop, as in [pun] for spoon. Clusters with a stop and a liquid usually reduce to the stop, such as in [bu] for blue. Clusters with a fricative then a liquid generally get reduced to the fricative, like in [fai] for fly. Clusters containing a stop and a glide are reduced to the stop, as in [kin] for queen. Fricative glide clusters are reduced to the fricative, like in [sɪm] for swim. Finally, nasal and glide clusters reduce to the nasal, such as in [musɪk] for music.

/S/ clusters serve as a special case for development, as they are learned separately from other clusters, with some children learning them first and some learning them last. In general, English-speaking children reduce /sl-/ clusters to [s] (as in /sling/ - /sing/), but reduce every other type of /s/ cluster (/sp-/, /st-/, /sk/, /sm-/, /sn-/, and /sw-/) to the second consonant in the cluster.

In general, children may have trouble with the production of liquids /l/ and /r/. To simplify clusters that include these liquids, children may replace these sounds for the glide /w/ or omit the sounds completely.

Two of the theories for liquid cluster development have been proposed by Greenlee (1974) and Elbert and McReynolds (1979). Greenlee (1974) introduced a three-stage process of developing stop and liquid consonant clusters which includes liquid deletion ([pɒt] for _plot_), substitution of the liquid with the glide [w] ([pwɒt]), and then correct production ([plɒt]).

Elbert and McReynolds (1979) created a four-step process based on Greenlee's (1974) previous proposal, including stage one, where both consonants are deleted; stage two, where one consonant is kept while the other is omitted; stage three, where both consonants are produced, but not correctly; and stage four, which is the correct production of both consonants. For example, _tree_ would first be produced as [i:], then [ti:], then [twi:], and, lastly, [tri:].

Cluster reduction also occurs in the Dutch language, similar to English. It is common for Dutch-speaking children to begin reducing clusters between ages 1;3 and 1;11. The strategy tends to decrease between ages 2;6 and 3;0, and it drastically decreases by the time the children are 4;3. Some cluster reduction may linger until the age of 6, and development of clusters could last until the age of 10 for some.

Consonant-cluster reduction is the most common phonological process used by Brazilian Portuguese-speaking children, and it has been found to be used the longest, sometimes past the age of 6;0. Studies have not shown any gender differences in language acquisition for typically developing Brazilian Portuguese-speaking children.

Unlike Brazilian Portuguese-speaking children, differences in language acquisition have been found in Cantonese-speaking children. With consonants, girls tend to acquire both initial and final consonants before boys do. Consonant clusters containing a fricative and /l/ are generally the final clusters acquired, and, by the ages of 7;6-7;11, typically developing children usually no longer reduce clusters.

Children using cochlear implants tend to use the same cluster-reduction strategies as children with normal hearing when learning words with consonant clusters. When liquids and fricatives are present before a stop in a cluster, the liquid or fricative is more often the consonant that gets reduced. For example, /pleɪ/ gets reduced to [peɪ], and /skaɪ/ is reduced to [kaɪ].
