= Zoppetti =

Zoppetti is an Italian surname. Notable people with the surname include:

- Alessandro Zoppetti (born 1979), Italian footballer
- Antonio Zoppetti, Italian linguist an essayist
- Cesare Zoppetti (1876–1940), Italian actor
- David Zoppetti (born 1962), Swiss writer
