= Edgar W. Schneider =

Austrian linguist (born 1954)

Edgar W. Schneider (born 30 May 1954) is an Austrian-German linguist. He is emeritus professor of English linguistics at the University of Regensburg, Germany, where he held the chair of English linguistics from 1993 to 2020. From 2021 to 2023, he was a visiting senior fellow at the National University of Singapore for one semester each year. He is known in World Englishes research mainly as the originator of the Dynamic Model of the evolution of Postcolonial Englishes. In a 2025 monograph Schneider advocates the application of complex dynamic systems theory to the understanding of language evolution and variability.

== Education and career ==
Schneider was born in Kirchdorf an der Krems, Austria. He studied at University of Graz between 1972 and 1978. Later, he completed his PhD in 1981 and his habilitation in 1987 at the University of Bamberg, Germany. In 1988 he was an interim professor at the University of Trier, and in 1988/1989 an adjunct associate professor at the University of Georgia, US. In 1989 he became a full professor at the Free University of Berlin. In 1993, he took over the chair at Regensburg. In Regensburg he founded the Research Center for World Englishes. Schneider was dean of studies at the Faculty of Language, Literature, and Cultural Studies of the University of Regensburg (2007–2009) and dean of the faculty from 2009 to 2011.

Schneider was the president of the International Society for the Linguistics of English (ISLE) in 2016–2018. He edited the scholarly journal English World-Wide (Amsterdam: Benjamins) from 1997 to 2013 and its associated book series Varieties of English Around the World from 1997 to 2011. He was a co-editor of the voluminous Handbook of Varieties of English (2004) and also of the Cambridge Handbook of World Englishes (2020), and is the author of an introductory textbook, English Around the World (2011, 2nd ed. 2020). He edits a series of short monographs for Cambridge University Press, called Elements: World Englishes.

== Bibliography ==
- 1988. Variabilität, Polysemie und Unschärfe der Wortbedeutung. Vol. 1: Theoretische und methodische Grundlagen. Vol. 2: Studien zur lexikalischen Semantik der mentalen Verben des Englischen. Tübingen: Niemeyer.
- 1989. American Earlier Black English. Morphological and Syntactic Variables. Tuscaloosa, AL: The University of Alabama Press.
- 1996. Introduction to Quantitative Analysis of Linguistic Survey Data: An Atlas by the Numbers. (with W.A. Kretzschmar) Thousand Oaks, CA: Sage Publications.
- 1996. Focus on the USA. (ed.) Amsterdam: Benjamins.
- 1997. Englishes Around the World. Vol. 1: General Studies - British Isles - North America. Vol. 2: Caribbean - Africa - Asia - Australasia. Studies in Honour of Manfred Görlach. (ed.) Amsterdam: Benjamins.
- 2000. Degrees of Restructuring in Creole Languages. (ed., with I. Neumann-Holzschuh). Amsterdam: Benjamins.
- 2004. A Handbook of Varieties of English. A Multimedia Reference Tool. Vol. 1: Phonology. Vol. 2: Morphology and Syntax. (ed., with B. Kortmann, C. Upton, R. Mesthrie and K. Burridge). Berlin, New York: Mouton de Gruyter.
- 2007. Postcolonial English: Varieties Around the World. Cambridge: Cambridge University Press.
- 2010. The Lesser-Known Varieties of English. An Introduction. (ed., with D. Schreier, P. Trudgill, and J. Williams). Cambridge: Cambridge University Press.
- 2011. English Around the World: An Introduction. Cambridge: Cambridge University Press. 2nd edition 2020.
- 2015. Further Studies in the Lesser-Known Varieties of English. (with J. Williams, D. Schreier, and P. Trudgill). Cambridge: Cambridge University Press.
- 2020. The Cambridge Handbook of World Englishes. (with D. Schreier and M. Hundt). Cambridge: Cambridge University Press.
- 2021. World Englishes at the Grassroots. (with Ch. Meierkord) Edinburgh: Edinburgh University Press.
- 2025. World Englishes as components of a Complex Dynamic System. Cambridge: Cambridge University Press.
