= English loanwords in Irish =

Present-day Irish has numerous loanwords from English. The native term for these is béarlachas (Irish pronunciation: [ˈbʲeːɾˠl̪ˠəxəsˠ]), from Béarla, the Irish word for the English language. It is a result of language contact and bilingualism within a society where there is a dominant, superstrate language (in this case, English) and a minority substrate language with few or no monolingual speakers and a perceived "lesser" status (in this case, Irish).

== Types ==
Anglicisms exists in many forms, from the direct translation of English phrases to the common form of creating verbal nouns from English words by adding the suffix -áil (this is also used to form verbs from native roots, such as trasnáil, "cross over", from trasna "across", tuigeáil (Connacht, Ulster) "understanding" (Munster tuiscint), from tuig "understand", and so on). Táim ag runáil go dtí an siopa ("I'm running towards the shop") is an anglicism, as "runáil" is a verb created from the English word "run" with the Irish suffix -áil attached; the traditional Irish for this would be Táim ag rith go dtí an siopa.

Calquing also occurs; it is called béarlachas in Irish and describes when an English phrase is literally translated into Irish, even though an equivalent Irish phrase already exists. An example of this is "Moilligh síos" ("slow down" – moill "delay" + síos "downwards", calqued from English), instead of the more traditional Maolaigh ar do luas ("reduce your velocity"), or simply Maolaigh! ("Slow down!").

Semantic loaning occurs too with the meaning of some terms being broadened to match English. An example is oráiste, originally meaning the orange fruit but also being used to describe to the colour.

== Old borrowings ==
Many words that are commonly thought by "purists" to be anglicisms have been a part of the Irish language for a long time, and have become "nativised". At the same time, certain words that are sometimes assumed to be from English are actually from Norse or Norman French, and as such are not true anglicisms. For example:

- liosta: "list" (Norman: liste)
- aidhm: "aim" (Norman: aesmer; where cuspóir is considered by some to be the 'native' Irish word)
- véarsa, béarsa [the ⟨b⟩- form considered to be uneducated dialect]: "verse" (Norman: verse [ˈβʲeːrsə]; the Irish word is rann)
- cathaoir: "chair" (both words derive from Latin cathedra)
- sciorta: "skirt" (both words are from Norse skyrta)
- cóta: "coat" (both words are from Anglo-Norman cotte)
- forc: "fork" (both from Latin furca)
- pláta: "plate" (both from Old French plate, from Medieval Latin plata)
- grúpa: "group" (both from French groupe)
- seans: "chance" (both from Old French chance)
- coinneal: "candle" (both ultimately from Latin candēla)
- páipéar: "paper" (páipér; both words derive from Old French paper, papier)

Other words are 'early anglicisms', having entered the language in the 18th and 19th centuries:

- praghas: "price" (also possibly from Norman French preis, pris)
- dabht: "doubt" (the Irish words are: amhras, gó)

The word péint may have been borrowed directly from English "paint" or from Old French peint. The verb pinntél ("to paint") appears in some Old Irish works.

Other words are actually Celtic roots that have entered English:

- carr: "car" (Old Irish carr, "wagon", from Proto-Celtic *karros)
- cros: "cross" (the Irish word is from Latin crux; the English form with -s at the end may be a borrowing directly from Old Irish)
- clog: "clock" (Old Irish cloc, Latin clocca, possibly of Celtic derivation)
- leathar: "leather" (Old Irish lethar, Old English leþer; both words derive from the Proto-Indo-European root *létrom)
- peata: "pet (animal)" (entered English from Scottish Gaelic, from Middle Irish pet[t]a; possibly from French petit "small", or Brittonic *petti- "thing, piece")
- iarann: "iron" (both words ultimately derive from Proto-Celtic *īsarnom, "iron")

=== False cognates ===
- The word ród ("road, route"), most commonly seen in iarnród (iron road, i.e. railway) is actually derived from Old Irish rót (from ro-sét, "great path", or rōut, "distance, length") and is not a borrowing of English road, although it may have been influenced by the Old English root rād ("riding").
- Oigheann, the Irish word for "oven", is not derived from the English; it comes from Middle Irish aigen ("cooking-vessel, pan"), from Celtic root *aginâ ("vessel"). English oven is from Old English ofn, from Proto-Germanic *uhnaz.
- Dé (a term used before names of days of the week, as in Dé hAoine, "Friday"), is a false cognate: it derives from Latin dies, which is from Proto-Italic *djēm, PIE *dyḗws ("heaven"), while English "day" is from Old English dæġ, from Proto-Germanic *dagaz.
- Domhan ("world") is derived from a Celtic root *dubnos, meaning "deep"; it is not related to English domain, which is ultimately from Latin domus, "house".

== Modern concepts ==
Words used for foreign inventions, imports, and so on, where a native Irish word does not exist, are often a macaronic import as well. These are strictly speaking not anglicisms, but examples of loans from foreign languages. In some cases an Irish word has been developed, and in others it has not. This has been a characteristic of word development in the language for as long as written records exist, and is not limited to anglicisms. In some cases the original Irish word is no longer known, or has a different meaning within the same semantic field:

Modern examples
English	New loanword	Original Irish
phone	fón	guthán
bicycle	badhsuiceal	rothar

Older forms include words such as:

- iarla (from Norse jarl), in place of tiarna (Irish), meaning "lord, earl"
- bád (from Old Norse), in place of currach (Irish), meaning "boat"

== Variation ==
In some cases, the foreign loan has an official pronunciation in Irish, and a colloquial one based on English; the colloquial form is an anglicism, while the official form is a Gaelicisation of the foreign word:

- ceint ([cɛnʲtʲ] or [sˠɛnʲtʲ]) "cent"
- bus ([bˠʊsˠ] or [bˠɔsˠ]) "bus"
- stádas ([ˈsˠt̪ˠaːd̪ˠəsˠ] or [ˈsˠt̪ˠat̪ˠəs, ˈsˠt̪ˠeːt̪ˠəsˠ], also [ˈsˠt̪ˠæt̪ˠəs, ˈʃt̪ˠæt̪ˠəsˠ]) "status"

The most striking forms of anglicisms, however, are the names of the letters of the alphabet—the vast majority of which are normally said in the English way, except for ⟨a⟩—as well as the use of words such as bhuel ("well"), no ("no"), jost ("just"), and álraight ("all right" – for go maith). Such words are used with their English syntax in Irish:

- Bhuel, fanfaidh mé jost anseo, dhiúnó, go dtiocfaidh tú ar ais.
  - Well, I'll just wait here, you know, till you come back.
- 'bhFuil tú álraight ansin, a bhuachaill? - No, nílim álraight anaonchor.
  - Are you all right there, lad? - No, I'm not all right at all.

Letters that are not traditionally used in Irish orthography occur (such as ⟨j, k, q, v, w, x, y, z⟩, as well as ⟨h⟩ at the beginning of words), though in older English loans the foreign sounds have been gaelicised:

- jab: job (beside post from French, obair from Latin)
- zú, sú: zoo (where gairdín ainmhithe already exists)
- w > bh / v: bhálcaereacht, válcaereacht "strolling, walking"

Most words that begin with ⟨p⟩ in the language are also foreign loans, as ⟨p⟩ did not exist in prehistoric or early Old Irish (such as póg "kiss" (Old Welsh pawg, Latin pacem "peace"), peaca (Latin pecatum "sin").

== Similar phenomenon in Scottish Gaelic ==
The same concept also exists within Scottish Gaelic, in which language it is referred to as beurlachas. Some examples include:

- stòraidh, "story" (instead of sgeulachd)
- gèam, "game" (instead of cluiche)
- tidsear, "teacher" (instead of the older mùin(t)ear)
- nurs, "nurse" (instead of banaltram)
