= Cambodian English =

Variety of English spoken in Cambodia

- Native to: Cambodia
- Region: Southeast Asia
- Native speakers: Variable, primarily educated Cambodians and English language learners
- Language family: Indo-European: Germanic; West Germanic; Ingvaeonic; Anglo-Frisian; Anglic; English; Southeast Asian English; Cambodian English
- Early forms: Proto-Indo-European: Proto-Germanic; Proto-West Germanic; Proto-English; Old English; Middle English; Early Modern English; Modern English
- Writing system: Latin (English alphabet); Unified English Braille

Official status
- Official language in: Cambodia

Language codes
- ISO 639-3: en-KH (unofficial)
- Glottolog: None

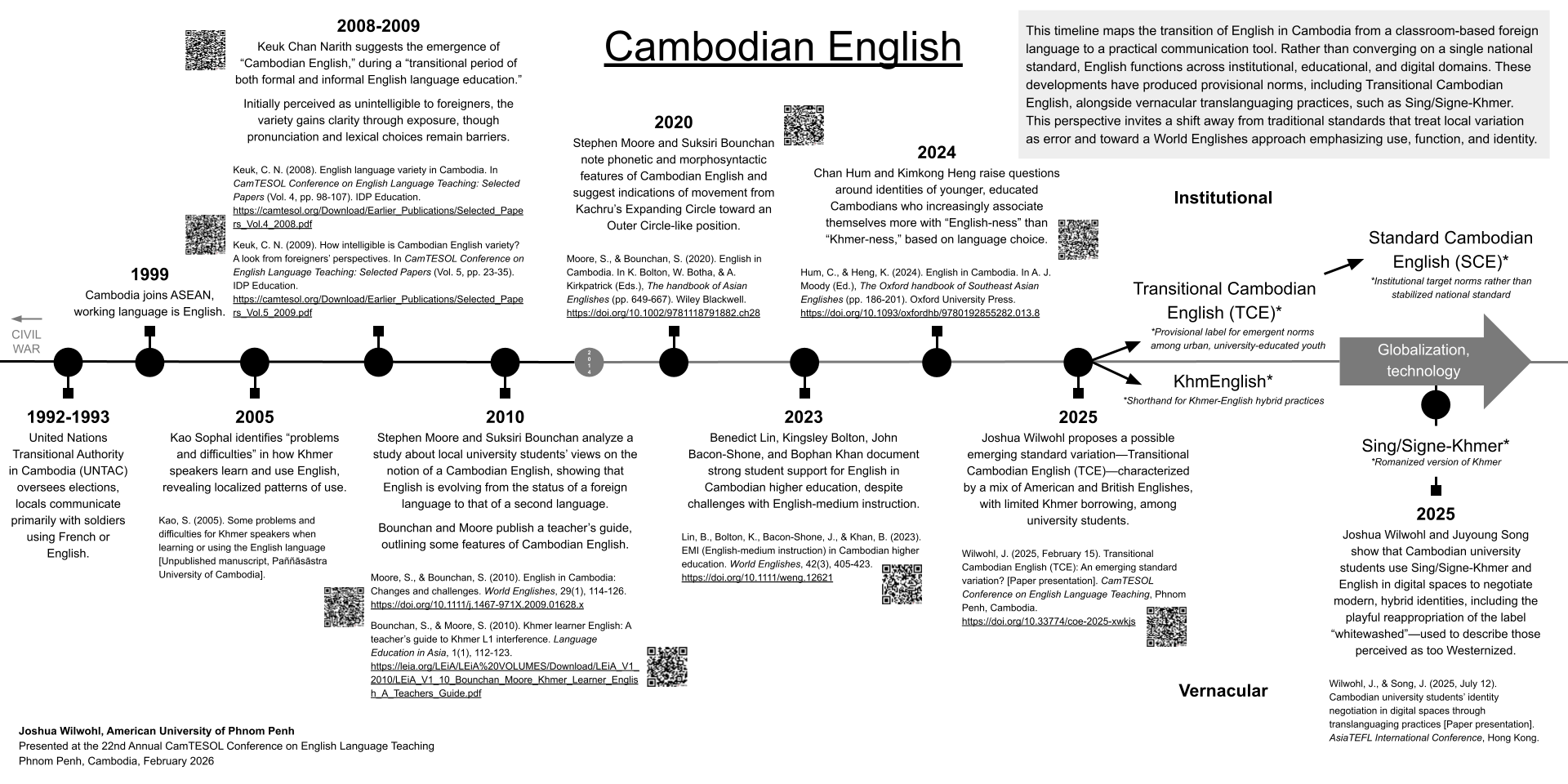
This timeline, by American scholar Joshua Wilwohl, maps the transition of English in Cambodia from a classroom-based foreign language to a practical communication tool.

Cambodian English is a World English variety spoken in Cambodia. It is used by the media, educated Cambodians, and English language learners.

== History ==
English was introduced to Cambodia in the 1990s through the presence of the United Nations Transitional Authority in Cambodia (UNTAC). Its usage expanded significantly following Cambodia's 1999 accession to the Association of Southeast Asian Nations (ASEAN). In the mid-2000s, Cambodian scholars such as Keuk Chan Narith and Kao Sophal began to formally identify and analyze the distinct features of Cambodian English.

Initially considered "unintelligible," its intelligibility has improved due to the growth of international school education, particularly among younger generations. Cambodian scholars Chan Hum and Kimkong Heng have observed an increase in children attending international schools in urban areas.

The rapid growth of globalization and technological advancements has further accelerated its adoption, particularly for hand-held devices and social networking. While a Khmer script exists for digital devices, there is a tendency to use audio messages in Khmer rather than typed messages.

== Characteristics ==
Cambodian English exhibits distinct phonological and morphosyntactic features, influenced by the Khmer language.

Phonology

- Deletion and insertion of the /s/ sound.
- Dropping of final consonants.
- Simplification of verb endings (-es, -ed).
- Distortion of non-native English sounds.
- Variations in word stress.

Morphosyntax

- Omission of prepositions and articles.
- Influence of Khmer syntax and word order.
- Use of present tense for past tense.
- Use of singular forms for plurals.

These features were identified by Stephen Moore and Suksiri Bounchan.

== Variations ==
Transitional Cambodian English (TCE) is a possible emerging standard variation, primarily observed among university students. It is characterized by a blend of American and British English with minimal Khmer linguistic influence, and it was first identified by American scholar Joshua Wilwohl.

A colloquial, non-standard variation, "KhmEnglish", has also been identified.

== Current status and sociolinguistic considerations ==
English is increasingly used across various domains in Cambodia, including education, business, tourism, technology, and media, leading some scholars to describe it as a "language of transformation." However, the growing prevalence of English raises concerns about potential impacts on Khmer language proficiency and cultural identity.
