= Schneider's dynamic model =

English language ecology model

The five evolutionary stages of the model

Schneider's dynamic model of postcolonial Englishes adopts an evolutionary perspective emphasizing language ecologies. It shows how language evolves as a process of 'competition-and-selection', and how certain linguistic features emerge. The Dynamic Model illustrates how the histories and ecologies will determine language structures in the different varieties of English, and how linguistic and social identities are maintained. It is named after Edgar W. Schneider.

== Underlying principles ==
Five underlying principles underscore the Dynamic Model:

1. The closer the contact, or higher the degree of bilingualism or multilingualism in a community, the stronger the effects of contact.
2. The structural effects of language contact depend on social conditions. Therefore, history will play an important part.
3. Contact-induced changes can be achieved by a variety of mechanisms, from code-switching to code alternation to acquisition strategies.
4. Language evolution, and the emergence of contact-induced varieties, can be regarded as speakers making selections from a pool of linguistic variants made available to them.
5. Which features will be ultimately adopted depends on the complete “ecology” of the contact situation, including factors such as demography, social relationships, and surface similarities between languages etc.

The Dynamic Model outlines five major stages of the evolution of world Englishes. These stages will take into account the perspectives of the two major parties of agents – settlers (STL) and indigenous residents (IDG). Each phase is defined by four parameters:

1. Extralinguistic factors (e.g. historical events)
2. Characteristic identity constructions for both parties
3. Sociolinguistic determinants of contact setting
4. Structural effects that emerge

	Phase 1: Foundation	Phase 2: Exonormative stabilization	Phase 3: Nativization	Phase 4: Endonormative stabilization	Phase 5: Differentiation
Sociopolitical background	English brought in by STL; Used in a non-English-speaking country	STL communities stabilize; English is regularly spoken and formally established as the language of administration, education and legislation; IDG now seek to expand contact with STL to secure status	STL's ties with 'land of origin' weaken; Colonized land strives towards independence	Stage of cultural self-reliance	Established nation; State of stability, free from external threat; Room for internal differentiation
Identity constructions	Both STL and IDG see themselves as distinct from each other; STL feel that they are still part of their home country, and their stay is temporary; IDG regard themselves as rightful owners	Identity of STL and IDG undergo slight shift; Mixed marriages take place; Segregational elitism occurs	Gap between STL and IDG reduced; Both groups view themselves as belonging to the territory	Members of STL community see themselves as part of the new nation; Ethnic boundaries redefined for IDG; Time of nation-building	Citizens no longer feel the need to define themselves as a single entity; Define themselves as members of smaller groups (e.g. ethnic, gender, city etc.)
Sociolinguistic conditions	Contact between STL and IDG serve utilitarian purposes; Each group continues to communicate within their confines; Marginal bilingualism develops	IDG develop bilingualism; English is considered an asset; STL's English treated as norm/standard	Pressure on IDG to acquire STL's English; Some of the STL accommodate special features of the IDG language; Complaints of 'corrupted' form emerge	Existence of new language form recognized; New local norm; Literary creativity	Group-internal linguistic markers
Linguistic effects	Koineization; Pidginization; Toponymic borrowing	STL's English moves towards local variety (bits of indigenous vocabulary is adopted); IDG acquire second language; Code-switching occurs	Heavy lexical borrowing; IDG's English show marked local accent; Huge changes in phonology, morphology and syntax	Linguistic homogeneity; Codification of new norm	Regional speech variation; Ethnic dialect markers; Markers of ethnic pride

== See also ==
- Bilingualism
- Identity (social science)
- Indigenous languages
- Language change
- Language contact
- World Englishes
