= Qal3ah =

Al-Qal3ah, Qal3ah, or Qal3ati (Arabic: القلعة al-Qalʿah [ælˈqɑlʕæ] — "the castle"; the 3 is an ASCII representation of the Arabic letter ع) was an Internet forum infamous for being the site of announcements and discussions by Islamic extremists. Postings included several videos of the decapitation of hostages by Abu Musab al-Zarqawi's group in Iraq. The website had upwards of ten mirrors, but all are down as of 23 February 2007. The Islamist-extremist watchdog group Society for Internet Research claim that the forums were owned by the Muslim reformist Sa'ad Al-Faqih (or al-Fagih). On the same day as the 7 July 2005 London bombings, the Qal3ah forum carried a posting which took responsibility for those bombings. But on July 9, 2005, The Guardian reported that al-Faqih denied ownership of the site and claimed that the accusation was a "Zionist smear."

Al-Qal3ah was registered in Abu Dhabi, capital of the United Arab Emirates. The site officially distanced itself from terrorist and pro-terrorism activity, maintaining that it was a discussion forum for religious and political views and issues. However, it has been labeled as a cover for a "jihadi forum" by SOFIR. Such claims cite as evidence that Sa'ad Al-Faqih has been identified by the United States Treasury as having financially assisted al-Qaeda. The mirrors' Internet service providers included Everyones Internet and PIPEX.
