= Italo-Australian dialect =

Australian-based dialect of Italian

- Native to: Australia
- Ethnicity: Italian Australians
- Language family: Indo-European: Italic; Latino-Faliscan; Latin; Romance; Italo-Western; Italo-Dalmatian; Italo-Romance; Italian; Italo-Australian dialect
- Early forms: Old Latin: Vulgar Latin; Proto-Romance; Tuscan; Florentine
- Writing system: Italian alphabet

Language codes
- ISO 639-3: –
- IETF: it-AU
- People with Italian ancestry as a percentage of the population in Australia divided geographically by statistical local area, as of the 2011 census.

Italo-Australian is an Australian-based dialect of Italian that is spoken by Australians of Italian descent.

== Characteristics ==
The exact number of speakers is unknown, but it is highly speculated that the language is mainly spoken by the younger generations, passed on by the elder ancestors, who created the language. Some researchers think that the dialect might have been spoken by nearly 900,000 Italian Australians in 2012.

== Origin ==
The foundation of this dialect is modern Italian, which was brought to Australia following the Italian diaspora in the post World War I era. It wasn't until the years after the second diaspora after World War II that the dialect came into note.

The language Italo-Australian lexicon was formed through the combination of modern Italian words with the English language vocabulary of Australia. Some words follow the rules of Italian spelling, changing to an English one only with a few character changes to make it sound Italian. Italian linguist Tullio De Mauro has noted the dialect in his famous book Storia Della Lingua as "developing dialect that is still enduring the modern influences of English".

De Mauro also claims the language is growing with the vocabulary being passed onto the younger generations of Italian Australians.

== Example words ==
English	Italo-Australian	Italian
Car	Carru (Note: The final u is typical in the Sicilian language in comparison with the Italian o)	Macchina
Cake	Checca	Torta
Market	Marchetta	Mercato
Farm	Farma	Fattoria
Backyard	Becchiarda	Cortile
Fence	Fensa	Recinto
To Park	Parcare	Parcheggiare
To Push	Pusciare	Spingere
To Stop	Stoppare	Fermare
To Start	Stardare	Cominciare
Bus	Bassu	Autobus
Cup	Cuppa	Coppa
Shed	Scedda (Scella), Sceddu, Sceiiu	Capanno
Shower	Scea	Doccia
Fridge	Friggia	Frigorifero
Chips	Cipi	Patate Fritte
Washing Machine	Guasci Mascina	Lavatrice
Spray	Spraia	Spruzzo
To Smash	Smesciare	Sfasciare
To Pick	Piccare	Raccogliere
Bag	Bega	Borsa
Boyfriend	Boifrendi	Fidanzato
Girlfriend	Gellafrenda	Fidanzata
To Spray	Spraiare	Spruzzare
Laundry	Guascious	Lavanderia
Switch	Suiccia	Interruttore
Ticket	Tichetta	Biglietto
Factory	Fattoria	Fabbrica
Girl	Gella	Ragazza
Rubbish	Robbisci	Immondizia
Garage	Garaci	Box Auto
(Wall To Wall) Carpet	Tappetu	Moquette
Melbourne	Melbuni	Melbourne
Sydney	Siddeni	Sydney
Darwin	Darvinu	Darwin
Portarlington	Portali Ntoni	Portarlington
Queensland	Quinsi Landa	Queensland
Holiday	Foludai	Vacanza
Lipstick	Lippi Sticcu	Rossetto
To Shift	Sciftare	Spostare
Heater	Hita	Stufa
Air Conditioner	U Friddu	Aria Condizionata
Bin	Binnu	Cestino
Chilli	Pipi	Peperoncino
Please	Pliss	Per Favore
Thank you	Tenchiù	Grazie
Breakfast	Brecchi Festa	Colazione
To Drive	Drive-are	Guidare
Job	Giobba	Lavoro
Boss	Bossu	Padrone
The News	I Niusi	Le Notizie
Street	Strittu	Via
Bill	Billu	Conto
Insurance	Insciuransa	Assicurazione
Driver's Licence	Licensa	Patente Di Guida
Cheque Book	Ciecbucu	Libro Degli Assegni
Cheque	Cieca	Assegno
Shop	Scioppu	Negozio
Freezer	Frisa	Congelatore
To Worry	Guariare	Preoccupare
Box	Bocsa	Scatola
Ham	Hemma	Prosciutto
Cheap	Cipp	Economico
Gas	Gassu	Gas
Petrol	Petroliu	Benzina
Electricity	Ilectricu	Elettricità
Muslims	Muri	Musulmani
Anthony Albanese	L' Arbanisi	Anthony Albanese
Baby	Baby	Bambino/a
Drink	Drink	Bevanda
Boy	Boy	Ragazzo
Yeah	Yeah	Sì
Bye	Tarà	Ciao
Sandwich	Sanguicciu	Panino
Movie	Firme	Film
Coles	Coless	Coles
Woolworths	Saffuguai	Woolworths
Discount Variety Store	I Cinesi	Negozio Di Sconti
Truck	Traccu	Camion
Tractor	Treccheta	Trattore
Love	Lavi	Amore
Drawer	Tira Turu	Cassetto
Sink	Singu	Lavello
Jam	Gemma	Marmellata
Grapes	Racina	Uva
Cleaning Cloth	Pezza	Panno Per La Pulizia
Moka Pot	Macchinetta	Caffettiera
Alright	Oraighti	Va Bene
Duck	Papara (Dacca)	Anatra
He	Iddu (Illu), Iiiu	Lui
She	Idda (Illa), Iiia	Lei
They	Iddi (Illi), Iiii	Loro
We	Nua (Nuatri), Nui	Noi
You (All)	Vua, Bua (Vuatri), Vui	Voi
You Are (Formal)	Vua/Bua Siti, Vui Siti	Lei È
Father	Patri	Padre
Brother	Frati	Fratello
Sister	Soru, Suaru	Sorella

== See also ==
- Italian Australians
- Languages of Australia
- Itanglese
- Siculish
