= Anglicism =

Word or construction peculiar to or borrowed from the English language

An anglicism is a word or construction borrowed from English by another language. Due to the global dominance of English in the 20th and 21st centuries, many English terms have become widespread in other languages. Technology-related English words like internet and computer are prevalent across the globe, as there are no pre-existing words for them. English words are sometimes imported verbatim and sometimes adapted to the importing language in a process similar to anglicisation (modification of borrowed non-English words to suit English language better). In languages with non-Latin alphabets, these borrowed words can be written in the Latin alphabet anyway, resulting in a text made up of a mixture of scripts; other times they are transliterated. Transliteration of English and other foreign words into Japanese generally uses the katakana script.

Some consider anglicisms to be relatively benign, and the use of English words may even take on a chic aspect; in Japan, marketing products for the domestic market often involves using English or pseudo-English brand names and slogans. In other countries, excessive use of anglicisms is seen much more negatively, and there are efforts by public-interest groups and governments to reverse the trend. The word anglicism can refer to any borrowing from the English language; the term americanism can be used for borrowings from specifically American usage.

== Definitions ==
Definitions of anglicism differ significantly across various fields. The word is employed in various situations of language contact.

The criteria for being considered an anglicism by the Usage Dictionary of Anglicisms in Selected European Languages are as follows: a loanword that is recognisably English in form with regards to spelling, pronunciation and morphology. In this specific sense, loan translations and calques are excluded (as well as words that are etymologically derived from languages related to modern French).

Some see anglicisms as harmless and useful, others perceive them as bad influences to be countered.

Other definitions of anglicism include: a word or construction peculiar to English; a word or phrase that is peculiar to British English; or English syntax, grammar, or meaning transposed in another language resulting in incorrect language use or incorrect translation.

== Adaptation ==
A number of scholars agree that for anglicism to take place, adaptation must first occur such as in the case of the integration of a great number of anglicisms in Europe. Fischer said that it is similar to neologism in the sense that it completes several phases of integration, which include: 1) the beginning, when it is still new and not known to many speakers; 2) the phase where it begins to spread and take part in the process of institutionalisation; and, 3) the word becomes part of the common core of the language. There are experts who propose a more detailed framework such as the model of anglicism adaptation that transpires on four levels: orthographic, phonological, morphological, and semantic.

== By language ==
=== Chinese ===
These are English terms, expressions, or concepts that have been absorbed into the Chinese language, including any of its varieties, and should not be confused with Chinglish, a variety of the English language used by some native Chinese speakers.

The origins of Chinese anglicisms vary, one of the most common being those obtained by phonetic borrowing. For example, a "bus" (traditional Chinese: 公共汽車; simplified Chinese: 公共汽车; lit. 'public vehicle', in Mainland China or Taiwan) is usually called "巴士"; (baa^{1} si^{6-2}) in Hong Kong and Macao because its Cantonese pronunciation is similar to its English counterpart. Another type of anglicism is syntactic anglicism, when a sentence is rendered following the English word order instead of the standard Chinese word order; for example, the word for "network" is 网络; (網絡) or 网路; (網路), where 网; 網 can be translated as "net".

=== Finnish ===
The anglicisms can be divided to four types: direct phonetic imitation, lexical and grammatical calques, and contamination of orthography. Official language (as given by the Language Planning Office) deprecates Anglicisms, and for the most part, native constructions are sufficient even in spoken language. Nevertheless, some anglicisms creep in.

Computer jargon is generally full of direct imitation, e.g. svappi "swap". Other topics of discussion where one finds abundant anglicisms are pop music, science fiction, gaming, fashion, automobiles and to some extent scientific topics. This is regarded a sign of overspecialisation, if used outside the context of the jargon. Generally, direct imitation is not as common, but there are examples. For example, the word sexy [ˈseksy], might be used as an adjective. This is teenager-specific.

Lexical calques take an English expression and translate it word-for-word to create a Finnish equivalent, as for example the English software term killer application, which becomes in Finnish tappajasovellus.

Some speakers, especially those in frequent contact with the English language, have created a grammatical calque of the English you-impersonal. The English impersonal utilises the second person pronoun you, e.g. You can't live if you don't eat. Here, the word you does not refer explicitly to the listener, but signifies a general statement. The same example is rendered in Finnish as Syömättä ei elä, where a separate grammatical impersonal (also known as passiivi) is used. When translated word-by-word, Sä et elä jos sä et syö, it will refer directly to the listener. Here the contraction sä of spoken language is used instead of the sinä of spoken language. Then, you will need to understand that it is an anglicism, or you can be offended by the commanding "You there!" tone produced. (There are also native examples of the same construction, so the origin of this piece of grammar may not always be English.)

An English orthographical convention is that compound words are written separately, whereas in Finnish, compound words are written together, using a hyphen with acronyms and numbers. In Finnish, prosessitekniikka and Intel 80286 -prosessori would be correct, but process engineering or Intel 80286 processor would not. Failure to join the words or omitting the hyphen can be either an honest mistake, or contamination from English.

Another orthographical convention is that English words tend to be written as the originals. For example, the computer jargon term from to chat is written as chattailla (chat + frequentative), even if it is pronounced sättäillä. The forms chattäillä or chättäillä are used, too. Sometimes, it is even standard language, e.g. sherry [ˈʃerry], instead of according to English pronunciation šeri [ˈʃeri].

=== French ===
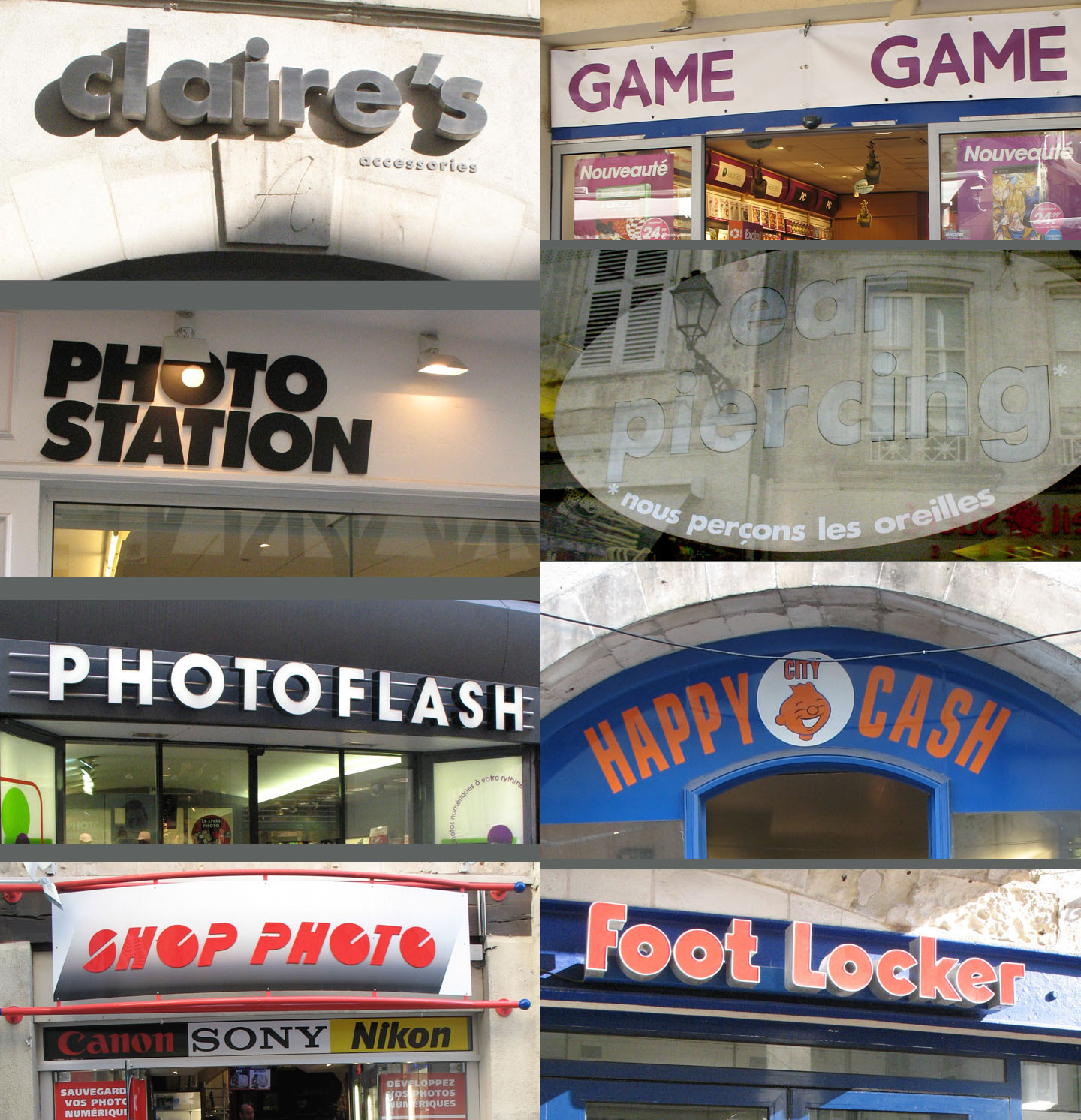
A typical shopping centre in La Rochelle, in western France, shows many examples of the English language.

A distinction is made between well-established English borrowings into French, and other words and structures regarded as incorrect. The term anglicisme is often pejorative, carries a large amount of political weight, and frequently denotes an excessive use of English in the French language.

French has many words of English origin for which the English roots are unknown or unrecognised due to a lack of salience or the length of time since the borrowing took place; this also includes other words which are seen as English but that are well accepted as part of French (e.g., parking, week-end). Other examples include clown (pronounced KLOON), square (meaning "public square"), and spleen (meaning "melancholy" rather than the organ). These are not considered anglicisms but are fully accepted as French words by the Académie Française. English words can take on a more specific meaning in French than they have in English; for example, dogue, the French phonetic spelling of the English word dog, refers specifically to one breed of dog, the English bulldog.

Occasionally governments and linguistic institutions of both Quebec and France have undertaken strenuous efforts to eradicate anglicisms, often by suggesting French replacements with French phonology and morphology. Although efforts in Quebec have been met with some success (e.g., fin de semaine for week-end), attempts by the Académie have largely been unsuccessful. Sociolinguists have attributed these failures to the general inability of linguistic institutions to enforce a linguistic norm. The Académie regularly updates a list of prescribed linguistic norms, many of which include using suggested French replacements instead of anglicisms (e.g., mot-dièse for hashtag).

Replacements have taken many different forms. For example, in Quebec French, the portmanteau word clavardage is increasingly gaining acceptance as a substitute for chat, or text messaging. This neologism is a word coined from the words clavier ("keyboard") and bavardage ("chat"). Other replacements have various forms created by the Académie and Office québécois de la langue française.

Quebec French and Metropolitan French tend to have entirely different anglicisms for historical reasons. Quebec French acquired many of its anglicisms in a gradual process of linguistic borrowing resulting from linguistic contact with English speakers for the roughly 250 years since Quebec was ceded by France to the British Empire after the Battle of the Plains of Abraham of 1759. Metropolitan French, on the other hand, mostly adopted its anglicisms in recent decades due to the post-Second World War international dominance of English, or the rise of English as a lingua franca. Due to the differences in English borrowings between Canada and France, the people of Quebec and France often consider each other's anglicisms to be incorrect or humorous, while considering their own to be perfectly normal.

An example of a Metropolitan French anglicism not used in Quebec French:

- sweat: short for sweatshirt, but pronounced like the English word "sweet"

An example of a Quebec French anglicism not used in France;

- frencher: to French kiss

The social meaning and acceptance of anglicisms also differs from country to country due to the differences in the historical relationship to French. In Quebec, anglicisms are never used in formal documentation (government papers, instruction sheets) and very rarely used in informal writing (magazines, journals). In 1993, the French passed the legislation Loi Toubon which forbids the use of anglicisms (or those from other languages) in commercial and government publications. In both countries, wherever the use of an anglicism is unavoidable, it is often written in italics or in quotations.

Various anglicisms are largely differentiated on the way in which they entered the language. One type of anglicism is a calque, or a direct translation from English. For example, the valediction sincèrement vôtre is regarded as an anglicism, since it is a direct translation of the English "sincerely yours". Other anglicisms include the wholesale adoption of English terms such as "business" or "start-up". Additionally, some English words in French might not have the same meaning as those words in English. One example is the word "golf", which has an increased semantic field, referring not just to the game of golf, but also to a golf course, as in on va aller au golf (trans: "we're going to the golf course").

Anglicism is a political term and does not necessarily indicate the etymology or history of the word itself. Rather, it indicates the common attitudes and perceptions about the (theoretically English) history of the word. For example, because English itself borrowed a great amount of French vocabulary after the Norman Conquest, some anglicisms are actually Old French words that dropped from usage in French over the centuries but were preserved in English and have now come full circle back into French. For instance, one attested origin of the verb "to flirt" cites influence from the Old French expression conter fleurette, which means "to (try to) seduce". Other possible origins for the word include flit, E. Frisian flirt (a flick or light stroke), and E. Frisian flirtje (a giddy girl). This expression is no longer used in French, but the English Gallicism "to flirt" has now returned to French and is considered an anglicism, despite its likely French origins.

=== German ===
Denglisch is a pejorative term used in German describing the increased use of anglicisms and pseudo-anglicisms in the German language. It is a portmanteau of the German words Deutsch (German) and Englisch. The term is first recorded from 1965. To some extent, the influence of English on German can be from normal language contact. The term Denglisch is however mostly reserved for forced, excessive exercises in anglicisation, or pseudo-anglicisation, of the German language.

One of the main concerns is that excessive use of English words can weaken the identity of German. Some language supporters believe that German companies adopting English slogans and terms makes the language less independent and pushes German words out of everyday use.

Wolfgang Kramer, a professor of economics at the University of Dortmund, founded the Society for the Protection of the German Language (Verein zur Wahrung der Deutschen Sprache), whose members fear that German could lose its status as a distinct language and develop into a simplified dialect influenced by English.

=== Italian ===
Under Benito Mussolini, efforts were made to purify Italian of anglicisms and other foreign words. A well-known example of anglicism used in Italian is guardrail, which has always been totally rooted in common usage, given that the Italian alternatives proposed in the last century such as: guardavia, sicurvia, guardastrada and the Helvetism guidovia have not met with any success, being little used. Recently an initiative for the Italian language is trying to spread in common language and media the Italian equivalents of guardrail, but still have not been approved for unknown reasons. Even the Italian equivalent idroplanaggio has never really replaced the well-known Anglicism aquaplaning for unknown reasons. Today, Italian is one of the most receptive languages for anglicisms. Antonio Zoppetti is nowadays one of the most prolific scholars on the topic of English interference in the Italian language.

=== Japanese ===
Anglicised words in Japanese are altered to reflect the absence of certain phonemes in Japanese, such as "l" (changed to "r") and "v" (changed to "b"). Other changes occur when, for example, an English word ending in "l" becomes "ru". For example, "hotel" becomes hoteru, as in the expression abekku hoteru (love hotel), the word abekku is strictly speaking not an anglicism, coming from the French avec (with).

=== Latvian ===
The first anglicisms in the written sources of Latvian appear at the end of the 18th century, however, up until the middle 1970s they were barely researched as their number remained low and since they mostly appeared in the terminology of sports and engineering. The direct contact between Latvian and English at that time was very limited, thus most of the anglicisms entered Latvian through German or Russian. Ever since Latvia regained its independence, there has been an influx of anglicisms into the Latvian language due to the fact that media in English is more accessible than ever.

=== Polish ===
Sporadic linguistic contacts between Polish and English-speaking areas have been noted at least since the 15th century. However, most early anglicisms in Polish were mostly limited to names for places in Great Britain and the Americas. The first proper anglicisms were also related to geography and were recorded in an 18th-century work Geografia, czyli opisanie naturalne, historyczne i praktyczne krajów we czterech częściach się zawierające by Franciszek Siarczyński. By the end of that century there were at least 21 lexemes of English provenance in Polish usage. The 1859 dictionary of foreign words by Michał Amszejewicz contains roughly 100 anglicisms, the so-called Vilnian dictionary of 1861 contains roughly 180 of such words. The anglicisms recorded in the 19th century were in large part words related to social, political, legal and economic concepts used in English society and lacking corresponding institutions in contemporary Poland. Another group comprised naval, sports-related and technical terms.

Typically new words were initially being written in their original form, especially when they were used to describe English or American contexts. Such was the case of the word budget, first recorded as such in 1792 in relation to English economy, but soon also used in Polish context. With time the word was assimilated and remains in modern Polish dictionaries, written as budżet. Early 19th century Dictionary of the Polish Language by Samuel Linde includes the following anglicisms: foksal (after London's suburb of Vauxhall; meaning an evening garden party in contemporary Polish), galon, klub, kwakier, piknik, poncz, rum and porter.

The assimilation of new English words into Polish sped up in the 20th century and gradually English replaced Czech, German, French, Italian and other languages as the primary source of new imports into the Polish language. At the turn of the century there were roughly 250 English words in use, by 1961 the number of English lexemes in Polish rose to over 700, breaking 1000 lexemes in the 1980s and at least 1600 in 1994.

Borrowings from English language used in modern Polish fall into a number of thematic categories:

- Science and technology: flesz, kompakt, komputer, kontener, stres, trend, walkman (used as a generic word for personal stereo rather than a trademark);
- Sports and healthcare: aerobic, lifting, jogging, peeling, aut, badminton, bekhend, bobslej, debel, derby, doping, jockey, forhend, hokej, lider, mecz, net, outsider, ring, rugby, set, tenis, walkover;
- Computers: driver, joystick, mysz (a semantic blueprint), serwer, skaner, spam;
- Economy: budżet, biznes, biznesmen, broker, dyskont, holding, leasing, joint venture, menadżer, marketing, sponsor, supermarket;
- Fashion: dżersey, dżins, lycra, topless;
- Politics: lobby, establishment
- Daily life: baby-sitter, happy end, logo, marker, market, notebook, puzzle, ranking, snack bar, scrabble, show, teflon, weekend;
- Maritime terms: kil, maszt, slup, spinaker, szekla, szkuner;
- Food: cheeseburger, chipsy, dressing, fast food, grill, hamburger, hot dog, lunch, popcorn, tost

Take note, that some of the borrowed words already have Polish equivalents and therefore are not recognised by all language users:

- menadżer (manager) instead of kierownik
- quad (quad bike) instead of czterokołowiec
- monitoring (CCTV) instead of nadzór, dozór
- W czym mogę pomóc (English: How can I help you) instead of Czym mogę służyć (English: How can I serve you).

In addition to lexical borrowings, there is also a number of calques in everyday use.

=== Russian ===
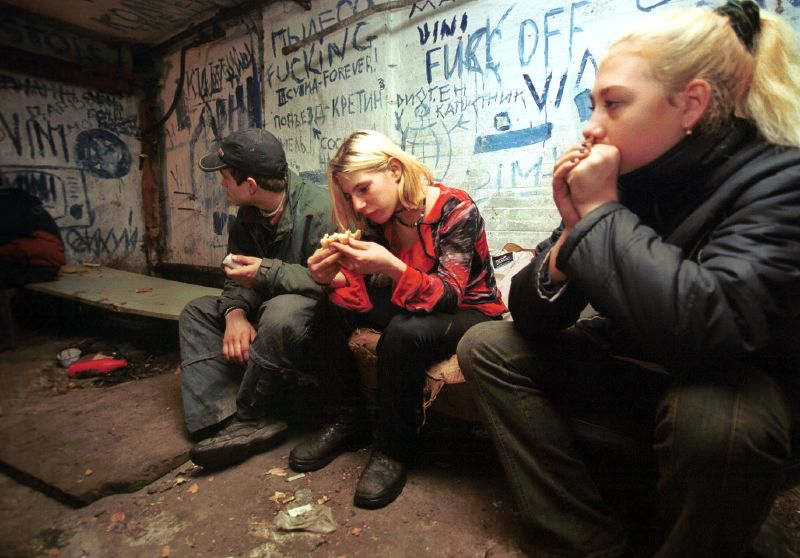
Mixed Russian-English grafitii

With increased globalization after the dissolution of the Soviet Union, English has made its way into the languages used in Russia, Ukraine, Belarus, and other former Soviet states. Runglish is used to talk about politics, economics, and other areas of modern life, often appearing in Russian-language news articles and headlines. (Note: For example: «Снегопад в России: травмы, пробки и блэкаут» ("Snowfall in Russia: Injuries, Traffic Jams, and Blackout").) English is considered more prestigious, and English loanwords may be used to demonstrate one's level of education and involvement in the global community.

Young people are major contributors to the popularization of Runglish. Anglicisms are an essential part of the youth vocabulary, and are becoming increasingly fixed within the language. Despite this, some Russians feel that it is important to preserve the framework of rules of the Russian language.

=== Spanish ===
Spanglish (a portmanteau of the words "Spanish" and "English") is a name sometimes given to various contact dialects, pidgins, or creole languages that result from interaction between Spanish and English used by people who speak both languages or parts of both languages, mainly spoken in the United States. It is a blend of Spanish and English lexical items and grammar. Spanglish can be considered a variety of Spanish with heavy use of English or vice versa. It can be more related either to Spanish or to English, depending on the circumstances. Since Spanglish arises independently in each region, it reflects the locally spoken varieties of English and Spanish. In general different varieties of Spanglish are not necessarily mutually intelligible. In Mexican and Chicano Spanish the common term for "Spanglish" is "Pocho".

=== Urdu ===
Urdish (a portmanteau of the words "Urdu" and "English") is used, when referring to code-switching between the two languages (this also applies to other varieties of Hindustani, including Hindi). Standard Urdu includes a limited amount of anglicisms. However, many urban Urdu speakers tend to use many more anglicisms when code-switching in speech. In standard written Urdu, anglicisms and code-switching are not common.

Examples:

- Life ko face karnā learn kijiye, patience aur courage ke saath (Standard Urdu: Zindagī kā samnā karnā sīkhiye, sabr aur himmat ke sāth / زندگی کا سامنا کرنا سیکھیے، صبر اور ہمت کے ساتھ

== See also ==
- Englishization
- Francization
- Barbarism (grammar)
- Influence of French on English
- Béarlachas (False Irish)
- Calque
- Eurospeak
- Engrish
- Loanword
- Pseudo-anglicism
- Americanism (disambiguation)
