= Malawian English =

Dialect of English commonly used in Malawi

- Region: Malawi
- Language family: Indo-European: Germanic; West Germanic; Ingvaeonic; Anglo-Frisian; Anglic; English; British English & African English; Malawian English
- Early forms: Proto-Indo-European: Proto-Germanic; Old English; Middle English; Early Modern English; 19th century British English
- Writing system: Latin (English alphabet); Unified English Braille

Official status
- Official language in: Malawi

Language codes
- ISO 639-3: –
- Glottolog: sout3331

Malawian English is the English language as spoken in Malawi. English is the country's official language.

== Introduction ==
English was introduced into Malawi towards the end of the 19th century, due to the influence of British explorers, missionaries, the arrival of the African Lakes Corporation, and colonial administrators present since the establishment in the 1890s of the British Central Africa Protectorate. The seventy years of British colonial rule that followed the Scramble for Africa, set the groundwork for English to grow into the area's dominant and most socially prestigious language. One in a thousand people speak English as their first language, but it is essential to progress to secondary education.

== Dominance ==
Since Malawian independence, the dominance of English has continued:

- official government records are written in English,
- parliament conducts its deliberations in English,
- the laws of Malawi are written in English,
- progression into secondary and higher education requires certification of competence in English,
- nearly all Malawian newspapers are published in English (though some include small Chichewa supplements),
- English remains the language of commerce in the country.

This remains true despite a large majority of Malawians speaking Chichewa and the small number of English speakers outside urban centres. Also, in Malawian government schools, students are taught in Chichewa, and learn English as a second language from about age 10. But in international schools in Malawi (like Saint Andrew's International High School in Blantyre) which follow the British curriculum, English is the language students are taught in, and do not learn Chichewa at all, as it is regarded as a local language.

== Replacement of local vocabulary ==
English words are replacing their equivalents in other Malawi languages. One study of a corpus of Chichewa discourse captured over a ten-year period found that references to numbers greater than 3 were exclusively in English, at least in urban areas.

== Non-linguistic expressions ==
Malawian English features some non-linguistic expressions that are still used, such as "eesh!", an exclamation meaning "oh my!"
