= Siculish =

Sicilian-influcenced American English

Siculish is the macaronic code-mixing or code-switching by immigrants from Sicily (Italy) to the United States in the early 20th century. The term Siculish is, however, rather recent, being first recorded in 2005.

Siculish was used to Sicilianize the names of American places among immigrant communities, such as Bensonhurst, Brooklyn, New York becoming nicknamed Bensinosti and Brooklyn becoming Brucculinu or Broccolino. Indeed, New York itself became known as Nu Iorca.

Forms of Siculish are also to be found in other Sicilian immigrant communities of English-speaking countries, namely Canada and Australia. A surprising similarity can often be found between these forms, through either coincidence, trans-national movements of Sicilian immigrants, or more likely, through the logical adaptation of English using linguistic norms from the Sicilian language. Some common Siculish terms and an explanation of their derivation (not necessarily common to all Anglo-speaking countries):

- baccausu - Sicilianisation of English words "back" and "house", as in the euphemistic term "backhouse", which is synonymous with "outhouse"; referring to the original location of toilet facilities, usually located in the backyard or rear of the home, at the turn of the 20th century before the advent of indoor plumbing; even used today to refer to any functioning bathroom.
- bissinissa - Sicilianisation of English word "business", either referring to a commercial enterprise or family-run shop, or to the personal affairs of an individual, sometimes used jokingly (also found as bissinissi in both singular and plural forms).
- bossu - addition of masculine u ending to English word "boss"
- carru - marriage of English "car" with Sicilian carru meaning "cart", modern use of existing Sicilian word to suit new environment
- brucculinu - Sicilianisation of the New York City borough of "Brooklyn"; can also refer to any Sicilian (or Italian) who has made it across the ocean to New York, or any of the other surrounding areas heavily populated by Italian immigrants in the northeastern United States.
- fenza - sicilianisation of English word "fence", as in the backyard fence; marriage with Sicilian frinza meaning "fringe" or "border"
- giobbu - addition of masculine u ending to English word "job", gi- being the sicilian form of English "j", with the doubling of the "b" a common Sicilian linguistic trait (may also be found as giobba, i.e. feminine ending)
- iarda - sicilianisation of English "yard", as in "backyard" or "garden", but also Sicilian iardinu means "garden"
- stritta - Sicilianisation of English word "street" - pronounced s-treeh-tah" (its pronunciation is the same of the word that in Sicilian language means "narrow")
- tupicu - sicilianisation of English word "toothpick" - pronounced too-pee-koo"

Many children of Sicilian immigrants will often confuse actual Sicilian words for Siculish. This will especially occur where both the Sicilian and English languages have basically the same word derived from Norman. For example, the following are Sicilian words that could be mistaken for being Siculish: anciòva means "anchovy", trubbulu means "trouble", damaggiu means "damage", raggia means "rage", tastari means "to taste" and truppicari means "to trip" - but they are examples of Sicilian and English words with the same Norman derivation.

== See also ==
- Itanglese, a macaronic combination of English and the standardized Italian language
- Italo-Australian, an Australian-based dialect based on Italian with loanwords from Australian English and Italianizing English words.
