= Arablish =

Arabic–English code-switching or combination

Arablish (a portmanteau of Arabic and English) is slang for Arabic–English code-mixing or code-switching or the macaronical combination of English and Arabic. The Arablish term was first recorded in 1984. It is alternatively termed Arbalizi, a portmanteau combining the words Arabic and Inglizi (the word for English in Arabic).

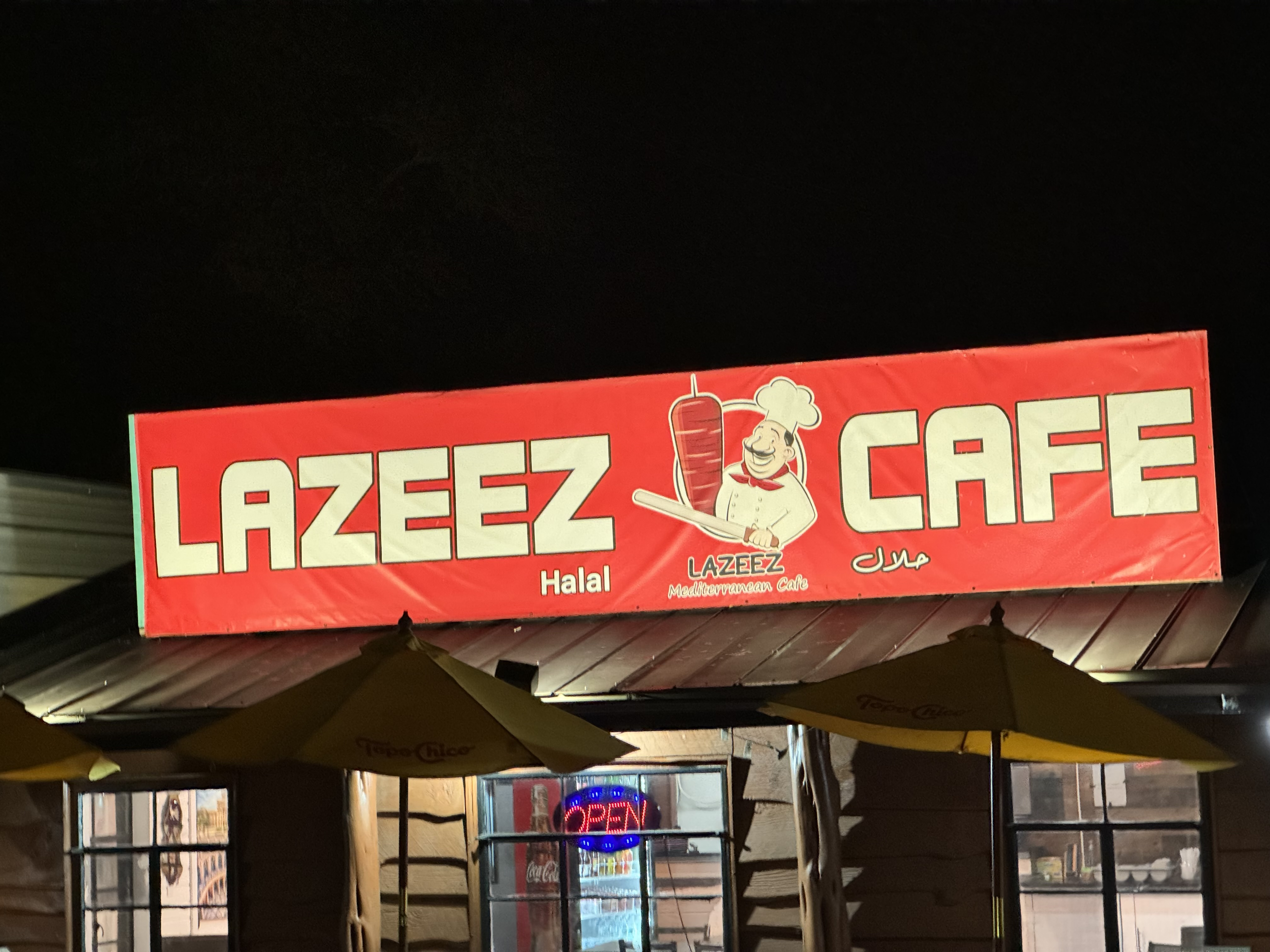
A restaurant in Austin, Texas that uses both Arabic and English in its name.

It is used, particularly among the youth, because of their poor knowledge of English, Arabic, or both, or for humorous effect. Arablish is becoming increasingly used in ordinary conversations and online.

Arablish usually consists of either filling in gaps in one's knowledge of Arabic with English words, speaking Arabic in such a manner that (although ostensibly "Arabic") would be incomprehensible to an Arab language speaker who does not also have a working knowledge of English.

== See also ==
Arabizi – alphabet for Arabic varieties that uses numbers and Latin characters
