= Itanglese =

One of several hybrid languages based on Italian and English

Itanglese, which is also known as Anglitaliano or (in the United Kingdom) Britalian, refers to code-mixing or code-switching of language based on Italian and English.

There are numerous portmanteau terms that have been used to describe and label this phenomenon. Other forms include Italglish (from 1985), Itaglish (1986), Itlish (1993), Itinglish (1997), Italish (1988), Italgish (2000) and Italianglish (2011).

== See also ==
- Siculish, a macaronic combination of English and Sicilian.
- Italo-Australian, an Australian-based dialect based on Italian with loanwords from Australian English and Italianizing English words.
- Antonio Zoppetti
