= Antonio Zoppetti =

Italian essayist (born 1965)

Antonio Zoppetti (born in Milan in 1965) is an Italian essayist, scholar of linguistics and the interference of English on the Italian language.

== Biography ==
Born in Milan in 1965, he graduated in Philosophy from the University of Milan. In 1993, for Editel of Milan he edited the CD-ROM transfer of Giacomo Devoto and Gian Carlo Oli's Il Dizionario della lingua italiana, the first complete digital dictionary marketed in Italy. In the 1990s he created various other pioneering works of digital publishing in CD-ROM and multimedia (film databases, encyclopedias and electronic literary archives) as an editor and as an author. In the 2000s he launched online cultural projects such as the website Linguaggio Globale (active from 2000 to 2015, winner of the “Alberto Manzi Prize” in 2004 for educational communication) and the first Italian blog dedicated to collective writing games (active from 2002 to 2012, awarded in 2003 at the Scrittura mutante competition at the Turin Book Fair). Author of fiction, nonfiction, and linguistics books, since 2017 he has focused primarily on the interference of the English language with Italian.

== Activity ==
Antonio Zoppetti's research and dissemination activity focuses on the study of the presence of Anglicisms in the Italian language. Through the book Diciamolo in italiano, along the lines of what Annamaria Testa (author of the preface) had done, she denounced with concern and a certain alarmism the risk of Itanglese and the increase in English words over the last 30 years through the analyses of dictionary counting and other statistical frequency parameters. He subsequently published the AAA Dictionary (Alternative agli Anglicismi) online, a website and community that grows rich through reader feedback. This work currently constitutes the largest attempt to classify unadapted English words circulating in the Italian language (over 3,600) alongside alternatives and synonyms in use or possible. From this undertaking, in 2018 he based the book L'etichettario. Dizionario di alternative a 1800 parole inglesi. Following the denunciation of the Anglicization of Italian and the establishment of these tools to promote the circulation of Italian alternatives, in 2019 he founded the community of "Italian Activists" on the portal Italofonia.info, which aims to curb Anglomania through the conscious use of our language. In a third book on the subject, Lo tsunami degli anglicismi, he correlated the phenomenon of Itanglese with the historical-social changes of the post-World War II period, globalization, and the advent of the internet, interpreting the rise of Anglicisms as a “side effect” of the expansion of English as an international language.

== Works ==
=== Linguistics ===
- K e spada. La controversa storia dell'italiano (Florence: GoWare, 2026).
- Meglio l'italiano o l'itanglese? Linee guida sull'uso di anglicismi nella comunicazione trasparente (Milan: Mind Edizioni, 2024).
- Lo tsunami degli anglicismi. Gli effetti collaterali della globalizzazione linguistica (Florence: GoWare, 2023).
- Dubbi grammaticali: La guida per evitare gli errori più diffusi (Milan: Mind Edizioni, 2023).
- Come non sbagliare mai più un congiuntivo. Né confonderlo con un condizionale (Milan: Mind Edizioni, 2023).
- L’etichettario. Dizionario di alternative italiane a 1800 parole inglesi (Florence: Franco Cesati Editore, 2018).
- Diciamolo in italiano. Gli abusi dell’inglese nel lessico dell’Italia e incolla (Milan: Hoepli, 2017).
- SOS congiuntivo for Dummies (Milan: Hoepli, 2016).
- Storia della lingua italiana, in Italiano nella scuola secondaria (Naples: Edises 2016, Third part, pp. 211–320).
- L’italiano for Dummies (Milan: Hoepli, 2014).
- Blog. PerQueneau? La scrittura cambia con Internet (Rome: Luca Sossella, 2003).
- Il dizionario della lingua italiana di Giacomo Devoto e Gian Carlo Oli (Milan: Editoria Elettronica/Le Monnier, 1993, CD-ROM version by A. Zoppetti).

=== Fiction ===
- Gentile editore io non demordo (Milan: RGB 2006).
- Laura immaginaria (Palomar: Bari, 2004).

=== Other cultural initiatives ===
- La sostituibilità degli anglicismi con corrispettivi italiani (Treccani language's Specials)
- I forestierismi nei dizionari: quanti sono e di che tipo (Treccani site)
- L’inglese nell’italiano: espansione per ibridazione (Treccani site)
