= South Atlantic English =

Dialect of English in islands of the Southern Hemisphere

South Atlantic English is a variety of the English language which is spoken on islands in the Southern Hemisphere. South Atlantic English is spoken on Tristan da Cunha and Saint Helena, but its spread on other islands is unknown. An intelligibility with British English, a linguistic variety of the same country, exists. There are fewer than 10,000 speakers of South Atlantic English. South Atlantic English does not have official status anywhere.

== Saint Helena English ==
On Saint Helena, the variety of South Atlantic English is locally referred to as 'Saint-Speak' or speaking 'Saint'. It originated in the 17th century; the East India Company established a colony on St Helena in 1658. The island was briefly captured by the Dutch in the 1670s, and settlers from France, West Africa, Cape Verde, the Indian subcontinent, and Madagascar arrived throughout its colonization under both the British and the Dutch. Nonetheless, English has been the largest influence on the island's linguistic makeup.

=== Phonology ===
South Atlantic English on Saint Helena has several phonological markers, some related to its non-rhoticity, others to its sound changes.

==== Rhoticity ====
Saint Helena English is non-rhotic, so /r/ is pronounced only if a vowel follows it in the same word - e.g. the r-sound is pronounced in 'flora', but not in 'floor'.

Despite this general rule of thumb, some speakers also pronounce the /r/ if it is followed by a vowel in the following word - to use the previous example, Saint speakers would pronounce the r-sound in 'floor and wall'. In addition, some speakers also add in an r-sound during some vowel sounds, for example 'idea' is pronounced ideear when the word following it begins with a vowel sound - these two phenomena are called linking and intrusive R respectively.

Furthermore, the intervocalic /t/ is often pronounced as a flap - for example, the t-sound in the words 'butter, letter, better' are the same as in the General American pronunciation, whereas in British English they would be usually pronounced either like the t in 'top' or the glottal stop in 'uh-oh'. Again, this is more typical of rhotic English varieties, so it is a curiosity.

==== Phonetic differences ====
Here are some other prevalent phonetic markers in Saint Helena English:

- Th-stopping - where the English th-sound is pronounced as t or d, for example 'thank you' is pronounced 'tank you'.
- Vowel raising and some vowel lengthening occurs quite noticeably, for example:
  - /ɒ/ has shifted to /ɔ/, for example the word 'job' is pronounced /d͡ʒɔb/ jorb.
  - /æ/ has shifted to /e/, for example the word 'bar' is pronounced /ber/, more like bear.
  - /ɛ/ has shifted to /e/ or /i/, for example the word 'bed' is pronounced /beːd/ beed.
- /w/ and /v/ have mostly merged into a single phoneme - that is, the v-sound and w-sound are mostly interchangeable, as seen in the local adage St Helena was created by two wolcanos.
- /t/ at the end of a word is frequently glottalized or dropped entirely, therefore a 'project' is pronounced as prorjek.
- Some sounds are added as though superfluous, for example 'fishing' is pronounced fishenin'.
- Syllabic 'r' is often dropped, for example 'funeral' (in which the second syllable is a syllabic 'r' in some rural British English dialects) is pronounced fewnel.
- Many word-final consonant clusters are simplified by deleting one of the consonants - 'build' becomes bil, and 'strength' becomes streng'.

=== Vocabulary ===
Where 'a couple' in English means two things, in Saint it can be two or more. A good/nice couple means 'a lot more than two' or 'enough for your liking' - for example, Have you a good couple of chips means 'take as many potato chips as you want'. Likewise, a good couple of days means 'not for some time'.

Many words in Saint are contractions of English phrases - for example mussie for 'must be/have', most for 'almost', miggies for 'hurry up' (from 'make haste'), and bitta for 'a bit of'.

The word stay does not have a temporary connotation in Saint, so asking Where you chirren stay? means 'Where do your kids live?'.

The standard greeting for friends and relatives is lurvy, from the Southern English 'Luvvie'.

The expression phew ya is a standard exclamation, and the adjective some can be used to mean 'quite' or 'very'. For example, Phew ya it some hot! means 'Wow, it's quite hot!'.

=== Grammar ===
Saint Helena Southern Atlantic English has several curious non-standard grammatical features:

- Saint Helena English also lacks plural marking after numerals - for example twenty pound, four month, nine boat, many house.
- The words see and lah are appended as interrogatives to confirm understanding, or to elicit a response from a listener. Questions do not have inversion or do-support. For example, Him have nine boat means 'He has nine boats', but Him have nine boat see? would turn it into a question, asking 'does he have nine boats?'.
- When forming the past tense, the English auxiliary 'have' is replaced by done.
- In addition, the indefinite article 'a' is often replaced by one - for example, Us done give y'all one beer means 'We have given you a beer'.
- The language allows null subjects, for example the sentence Met with two girl on you boat is grammatically valid, and the matter of who met the two girls on the listener's boat is inferred through context.
- Possessive pronouns are often simplified, for example What you name? mean 'what's your name?'
- The first person plural pronoun, regardless of its place in the sentence, is always 'us' - for example, us done bin out means 'we have been out'.
- The second person plural pronoun varies, but y'all is the most preferred form.
- Demonstratives (like 'this' or 'that') are often omitted
- The suffix -ed for the past tense is also omitted - both this and the prior point are illustrated by the phrase You never come Town much them days, meaning 'You never came to Jamestown much back then'.
- St Helena English allows multiple negation, for example You no eat no food.
- The double modal construction is also sometimes used, for example Might be ill, but I may can go by shop implies despite the speaker's illness, it's possible the speaker has the ability to enter the shop.

=== Sample words and phrases ===
Some Saint vocabulary is more similar to American than British, and this is most likely related to the temporary movement of locals to Ascension Island in the 1940s, where they encountered Americans at the USAF base and picked up their terminology. Here are some sample words and phrases in Saint Helena South Atlantic English. :

- 'Yes' is pronounced /ɪɹs/ eeirce - like 'pierce' without the p sound.
- 'August' is pronounced Ow-gus
- 'July' is pronounced with emphasis on the first syllable - JEW-lee
- 'Buoy' is pronounced like the American boo-ee, and 'Boutique' is pronounced Bow-teek
- Chips and pants refer to the American, not British, understandings - potato chips and trousers.

== Tristan da Cunha English ==
Tristan da Cunha English, locally called Tristanian, shows several unique features due to the island's isolation.

=== Phonetics and phonology ===
- The vowel sequence /ei/ is shortened and non-diphthongized, but its length is preserved, so 'base' is pronounced /be:s/ bes.
- T-glottalization occurs medially, for example at the t-sounds in 'better, letter, butter'.
- There is extensive insertion of the breathy [h] sound before various vowels, for example in the phrase Happles 'n horanges. This is most notable in the way that the locals refer to Tristan - as the 'island', which is pronounced more like hiland.
- There is devoicing of the z-sound and z-sound medially, as well as at the end of plurals and genitives
  - The letter s at the end of 'rites' and 'rides' is voiceless in both cases.
  - Likewise, the zh-sound in 'television' becomes more like televishon.
- Many vowels in Tristanian are lengthened noticeably, which is also seen in Saint Helenian English.
- Also like Saint Helenian, Tristanian is non-rhotic, but does have linking and intrusive r sounds.

=== Grammar ===
Many features are comparatively similar to Saint Helenian English. Tristanian's grammar includes:

- A lack of plural marking, such as two man, four street, ten finger.
- Distinct second person plural pronouns are used, such as y'all islander and you's there.
- Verbal inflectional morphology is highly simplified, such as She see six planet.
- The pronoun "them" is used to mark definite noun phrases, as seen in sentences like "They never eat much them days.". This links with the omission of demonstratives, which are instead implied through context
- Expressiveness drives peculiarities in Tristan da Cunha English, including double comparatives (e.g., "I like that more better") and double negation (e.g., "nobody never come out or nothing").
- In questions, inversion is not used, but rising intonation signifies a question, as in constructions like "Where they is?"
- In Tristanian, the uninflected form of a verb is used in compound and place names - for example in the place name Ridge-where-the-Goat-jump-off.
