= World Englishes =

Indigenized varieties of English

World Englishes are emerging localized or indigenized varieties of English, especially varieties that have developed in territories influenced by the United Kingdom or the United States. The study of World Englishes consists of identifying varieties of English used in diverse sociolinguistic contexts globally and analyzing how sociolinguistic histories, multicultural backgrounds and contexts of function influence the use of English in different regions of the world.

The issue of World Englishes was first raised in 1978 to examine concepts of regional Englishes globally. Pragmatic factors such as appropriateness, comprehensibility and interpretability justified the use of English as an international and intra-national language. In 1988, at a Teachers of English to Speakers of Other Languages (TESOL) conference in Honolulu, Hawaii, the International Committee of the Study of World Englishes (ICWE) was formed. In 1992, the ICWE formally launched the International Association for World Englishes (IAWE) at a conference of "World Englishes Today", at the University of Illinois, USA. There are two academic journals devoted to the study of this topic, titled English World-Wide (since 1980) and World Englishes (since 1982). There are a number of published handbooks and textbooks on the subject.

Currently, there are approximately 75 territories where English is spoken either as a first language (L1) or as an unofficial or institutionalized second language (L2) in fields such as government, law, and education. It is difficult to establish the total number of Englishes in the world, as new varieties of English are constantly being developed and discovered.

== World English vs. World Englishes vs. Global Englishes ==
The notions of World English and World Englishes are far from similar, although the terms are often mistakenly used interchangeably. World English refers to the English language as a lingua franca used in business, trade, diplomacy and other spheres of global activity, while World Englishes refers to the different varieties of English and English-based creoles developed in different regions of the world. Alternatively, the term Global Englishes has been used by scholars in the field to emphasize the more recent spread of English due to globalization, which has resulted in increased usage of English as a lingua franca.

== Historical context ==
=== History of English ===
English is a West Germanic language that originated from the Anglo-Frisian dialects brought by Germanic invaders into Britain. Initially, Old English was a diverse group of dialects, reflecting the varied origins of the Anglo-Saxon kingdoms of England. Eventually, one of these dialects, Late West Saxon, came to dominate.

The original Old English was then influenced by two further waves of invasion: the first by speakers of the Scandinavian branch of the Germanic language family, who conquered and colonized parts of Britain in the 8th and 9th centuries; the second by the Norman Conquest of England in the 11th century, by invaders who spoke Old Norman and ultimately developed a Norman variety called Anglo-Norman. For two centuries after the Norman Conquest, French became the language of everyday life among the upper classes in England. Although the language of the masses remained English, the bilingual character of England in this period was thus formed.

During the Middle English period, France and England experienced a process of separation. This period of conflicting interests and feelings of resentment was later termed the Hundred Years' War. By the beginning of the 14th century, English had regained universal use and become the principal tongue of all England, but not without having undergone significant change.

During the Renaissance, patriotic feelings regarding English brought about the recognition of English as the national language of England. The language was advocated as acceptable for learned and literary use. With the Great Vowel Shift, the language in this period matured to a standard and differed significantly from the Middle English period, becoming recognizably "modern".

By the 18th century, three main forces were driving the direction of the English language: (1) to reduce the language to rule and effect a standard of correct usage; (2) to refine the language by removing supposed defects and introducing certain improvements; and (3) to fix English permanently in the desired form. This desire for system and regularity in the language contrasted with the individualism and spirit of independence characterized by the previous age.

By the 19th century, the expansion of the British Empire, as well as global trade, had led to the spread of English around the world. The rising importance of some of England's larger colonies and former colonies, such as the rapidly developing United States, enhanced the value of the English varieties spoken in these regions, encouraging the belief, among the local populations, that their distinct varieties of English should be granted equal standing with the standard of Great Britain.

=== Global spread of English ===
==== First dispersal: English is transported to the New World ====
The first diaspora involved relatively large-scale migrations of mother-tongue English speakers from England, Scotland and Ireland predominantly to North America and the Caribbean, Australia, South Africa and New Zealand. Over time, their own English dialects developed into modern American, Canadian, West Indian, South African, Australian, and New Zealand Englishes. In contrast to the English of Great Britain, the varieties spoken in modern North America and Caribbean, South Africa, Australia, and New Zealand have been modified in response to the changed and changing sociolinguistic contexts of the migrants, for example being in contact with indigenous Native American, Khoisan and Bantu, Aboriginal or Maori populations in the colonies.

==== Second dispersal: English is transported to Asia and Africa ====
The second diaspora was the result of the colonization of Asia and Africa, which led to the development of 'New Englishes', the second-language varieties of English. In colonial Africa, the history of English is distinct between West and East Africa. English in West Africa began with trade, particularly the slave trade. English soon gained official status in what are today Gambia, Sierra Leone, Ghana, Nigeria and Cameroon, and some of the pidgin and creoles which developed from English contact, including Krio (Sierra Leone) and Cameroon Pidgin, have large numbers of speakers now.

As for East Africa, extensive British settlements were established in what are now Kenya, Uganda, Tanzania, Malawi, Zambia and Zimbabwe, where English became a crucial language of the government, education and the law. From the early 1960s, the six countries achieved independence in succession; but English remained the official language and had large numbers of second language speakers in Uganda, Zambia, Zimbabwe and Malawi (along with Chewa).

English was formally introduced to the sub-continent of South Asia (India, Bangladesh, Pakistan, Sri Lanka, Nepal and Bhutan) during the second half of the eighteenth century. In India, English was given status through the implementation of Macaulay 'Minute' of 1835, which proposed the introduction of an English educational system in India. Over time, the process of 'Indianization' led to the development of a distinctive national character of English in the Indian sub-continent.

British influence in South-East Asia and the South Pacific began in the late eighteenth century, involving primarily the territories now known as Singapore, Malaysia and Hong Kong. Papua New Guinea, also a British protectorate, exemplified the English-based pidgin - Tok Pisin.

The US came late in South-East Asia but their influence spread quickly as their reforms on education in the Philippines progressed in their less than half a century colonization of the islands. English has been taught since the US period and is one of the official languages of the Philippines. Ever since English became the official language, a localized variety gradually emerged - Philippine English. Lately, linguist Wilkinson Daniel Wong Gonzales argued that this variety has in itself more varieties, suggesting that the Philippines move towards Philippine Englishes paradigm to progress further in Schneider's dynamic model after gathering evidences of such happening.

Nowadays, English is also learnt in other countries in neighboring areas, most notably in Taiwan, Japan and Korea.

== Classification of Englishes ==
The spread of English around the world is often discussed in terms of three distinct groups of users, where English is used respectively as:

1. a native language (ENL); the primary language of the majority population of a country, such as in the United States, the United Kingdom and Australia.
2. a second language (ESL); an additional language for intranational as well as international communication in communities that are multilingual, such as in India, Pakistan, Nigeria, and Singapore. Most of these Englishes developed as a result of imperial expansion that brought the language to various parts of the world.
3. a foreign language (EFL); used almost exclusively for international communication, such as in Japan.

=== Kachru's Three Circles of English ===
Braj Kachru's Three Circles of English

The most influential model of the spread of English is Braj Kachru's model of World Englishes. In this model the diffusion of English is captured in terms of three concentric circles of the language: the Inner Circle, the Outer Circle, and the Expanding Circle.

The Inner Circle refers to English as it originally took shape and was spread across the world in the first diaspora. In this transplantation of English, speakers from England carried the language to Australia, New Zealand, and North America. The Inner Circle thus represents the traditional historical and sociolinguistic bases of English in regions where it is now used as a primary language: the United Kingdom, the United States, Australia, New Zealand, Ireland, and anglophone Canada. English is the native language or mother tongue of most people in these countries. The total number of English speakers in the inner circle is as high as 380 million, of whom some 120 million are outside the United States.

The Outer Circle of English was produced by the second diaspora of English, which spread the language through imperial expansion by Great Britain in Asia and Africa. In these regions, English is not the native tongue but serves as a useful lingua franca between ethnic and language groups. Higher education, the legislature and judiciary, national commerce and so on may all be carried out predominantly in English. This circle includes India, Nigeria, Bangladesh, Pakistan, Malaysia, Tanzania, Kenya, South Africa, the Philippines (colonized by the US) and others. The total number of English speakers in the outer circle is estimated to range from 150 million to 300 million. Singapore, while in the Outer Circle, may be drifting into the Inner Circle as English becomes more often used as a home language (see Languages of Singapore), much as Ireland did earlier. The Outer Circle also includes countries where most people speak an English-based creole, yet retain standard English for official purposes, such as Jamaica, Trinidad and Tobago, Barbados, Guyana, Belize and Papua New Guinea.

Finally, the Expanding Circle encompasses countries where English plays no historical or governmental role, but where is nevertheless widely used as a medium of international communication. This includes much of the rest of the world's population not categorized above, including territories such as China, Russia, Japan, South Korea, non-Anglophone Europe (especially Central Europe and Nordic countries), and the Middle East. The total in this expanding circle is the most difficult to estimate, especially because English may be employed for specific, limited purposes, usually in a business context. The estimates of these users range from 100 million to one billion.

The inner circle is 'norm-providing'; that means that the English language norms is developed in these countries. The outer circle (mainly New Commonwealth countries) is 'norm-developing'. The expanding circle (which includes much of the rest of the world) is 'norm-dependent' because it relies on the standards set by native speakers in the inner circle.

=== Schneider's dynamic model of postcolonial Englishes ===
Edgar Werner Schneider tries to avoid a purely geographical and historical approach evident in the 'circles' models and incorporates sociolinguistic concepts pertaining to acts of identity. His model suggests that, despite all differences in geography and history, there is a fundamentally uniform process underlying all instances of the emergence of new World Englishes, motivated by the changing social relationship between a region's indigenous population and settlers who came to that region.

The relationship between historical and social conditions and linguistic developments is viewed as a unilateral implicational relationship among four components. The political history of a country, typically from colony to independent nationhood, is reflected in the identity rewritings of the groups involved (indigenous population and settlers). These determine sociolinguistic conditions of language contact (such as the acquisition of the other party's language), linguistic usage (such as the amount and kind of mutual interaction), and language attitudes. Linguistic developments, and structural changes in the varieties concerned, follow.

The model outlines five characteristic stages in the spread of English:

Phase 1 – Foundation: This is the initial stage of the introduction of English to a new territory over an extended period of time. Two linguistic processes are operative at this stage: (a) language contact between English and indigenous languages; (b) contact between different dialects of English of the settlers which eventually results in a new stable dialect (see koiné). At this stage, bilingualism is marginal. A few members of the local populace may play an important role as interpreters, translators, and guides. Borrowings are limited to lexical items; with local place names and terms for local fauna and flora being adopted by the English.

Phase 2 – Exonormative stabilization: At this stage, the settler communities tend to stabilize politically under British rule. English increases in prominence and though the colloquial English is a colonial koiné, the speakers look to England for their formal norms. Local vocabulary continues to be adopted. Bilingualism increases amongst the indigenous population through education and increased contacts with English settlers. Knowledge of English becomes an asset, and a new indigenous elite develops.

Phase 3 – Nativization: According to Schneider, this is the stage at which a transition occurs as the English settler population starts to accept a new identity based on present and local realities, rather than sole allegiance to their 'mother country'. By this time, the indigenous strand has also stabilized an L2 system that is a synthesis of substrate effects, interlanguage processes, and features adopted from the settlers' koiné English. Neologisms stabilize as English is made to adapt to local sociopolitical and cultural practices.

Phase 4 – Endonormative stabilization: This stage is characterized by the gradual acceptance of local norms, supported by a new locally rooted linguistic self-confidence. By this time political events have made it clear that the settler and indigenous strands are inextricably bound in a sense of nationhood independent of Britain. Acceptance of local English(es) expresses this new identity. National dictionaries are enthusiastically supported, at least for new lexis (and not always for localized grammar). Literary creativity in local English begins to flourish.

Phase 5 – Differentiation: At this stage, there is a change in the dynamics of identity as the young nation sees itself as less defined by its differences from the former colonial power and more as a composite of subgroups defined on regional, social and ethnic lines. Coupled with the simple effects of time in effecting language change (with the aid of social differentiation) the new English koiné starts to show greater differentiation.

=== Other models of classification ===
==== Strevens' world map of English ====
The oldest map of the spread of English is Strevens' world map of English. His world map, even predating that of Kachru's three circles, showed that since American English became a separate variety from British English, all subsequent Englishes have had affinities with either one or the other.

==== McArthur's Circle of World English ====
McArthur's "wheel model" has an idealized central variety called "World Standard English," which is best represented by "written international English." The next circle is made of regional standards or standards that are emerging. Finally, the outer layer consists of localized varieties which may have similarities with the regional standards or emerging standards.

Although the model is neat, it raises several problems. Firstly, the three different types of English — ENL, ESL and EFL, are conflated in the second circle. Secondly, the multitude of Englishes in Europe is also missing in this layer. Finally, the outside layer includes pidgins, creoles and L2 Englishes. Most scholars would argue that English pidgins and creoles do not belong to one family: rather they have overlapping multiple memberships.

==== Görlach's circle model of English ====
Manfred Görlach's and McArthur's models are reasonably similar. Both exclude English varieties in Europe. As Görlach does not include EFLs at all, his model is more consistent, though less comprehensive. Outside the circle are mixed varieties (pidgins, creoles, and mixed languages involving English), which are better categorized as having partial membership.

==== Modiano's model of English ====
In Modiano's model of English, the center consists of users of English as an International Language, with a core set of features that are comprehensible to the majority of native and competent non-native speakers of English. The second circle consists of features that may become internationally common or may fall into obscurity. Finally, the outer area consists of five groups (American English, British English, other major varieties, local varieties, and foreign varieties) each with features particular to their own speech community and which are unlikely to be understood by most members of the other four groups.

== Variations and varieties ==
The World Englishes paradigm is not static, and neither are rapidly changing realities of language use worldwide. The use of English in the Outer and Expanding Circle societies (refer to Kachru's Three Circles of English) continues its rapid spread, while at the same time new patterns of language contact and variety differentiation emerge. The different varieties range from English in the Inner circle societies such as the United States, Canada, South Africa, Australia and New Zealand, to the Outer circle post-colonial societies of Asia and Africa. The World Englishes Initiative, in recognizing and describing the New Englishes of the Caribbean, Africa and Asia, has been partly motivated by a consideration of the local linguistic factors and partly by a consideration of the wider cultural and political contexts of language acquisition and use. This, in turn, has involved the creative rewriting of discourses towards a recognition of pluralism and multiple possibilities for scholarship. The notion of varieties in this context is similarly dynamic, as new contexts, new realities, new discourses, and new varieties continue to emerge.

The terms language and dialect are not easily defined concepts. It is often suggested that languages are autonomous, while dialects are heteronomous. It is also said that dialects, in contrast with languages, are mutually intelligible, though this is not always the case. Dialects are characteristically spoken, do not have a codified form and are used only in certain domains. In order to avoid the difficult dialect-language distinction, linguists tend to prefer a more neutral term, variety, which covers both concepts and is not butted by popular usage. This term is generally used when discussing World Englishes.

== The future of World Englishes ==
Two hypotheses have been advanced about English's future status as the major world language: that it may ultimately fragment into a large number of mutually unintelligible varieties (in effect, different languages), or that the current different varieties may converge so that differences across groups of speakers are largely eliminated.

=== English as the language of 'others' ===
If English is, numerically speaking, the language of 'others', then the center of gravity of the language is almost certain to shift in the direction of the 'others'. In the words of Widdowson, there is likely to be a paradigm shift from one of language distribution to one of language spread:

When we talk about the spread of English, then, it is not that the conventionally coded forms and meanings are transmitted into different environments and different surroundings, and taken up and used by different groups of people. It is not a matter of the actual language being distributed but of the virtual language being spread and in the process being variously actualized. The distribution of the actual language implies adoption and conformity. The spread of virtual language implies adaptation and nonconformity. The two processes are quite different.

=== A different world language ===
The other potential shift in the linguistic center of gravity is that English could lose its international role altogether or come to share it with a number of equals. Although this would not happen mainly as a result of native-speaker resistance to the spread of non-native speaker Englishes and the consequent abandoning of English by large numbers of non-native speakers, the latter could play a part.

As evidence that English may eventually give way to another language (or languages) as the world's lingua franca, David Crystal cites Internet data:

When the internet started it was of course 100 percent English because of where it came from, but since the 1980s that status has started to fall away. By 1995, it was down to about 80 per cent present of English on the internet, and the current figures for 2001 are that it is hovering somewhere between 60 percent and 70 percent, with a significant drop likely over the next four or five years.

On the other hand, there are at least 1500 languages present on the internet now and that figure is likely to increase. Nevertheless, Crystal predicts that English will retain its dominant presence.

== See also ==
- Language shift
- List of countries by English-speaking population
- List of macaronic forms of English
- List of English-based pidgins
- Standard English
- Vulgar Latin
- Hinglish
- Euro English
- Pseudo-English
- Rally English
