= Singlish =

Contact language spoken in Singapore

- Colloquial Singapore English
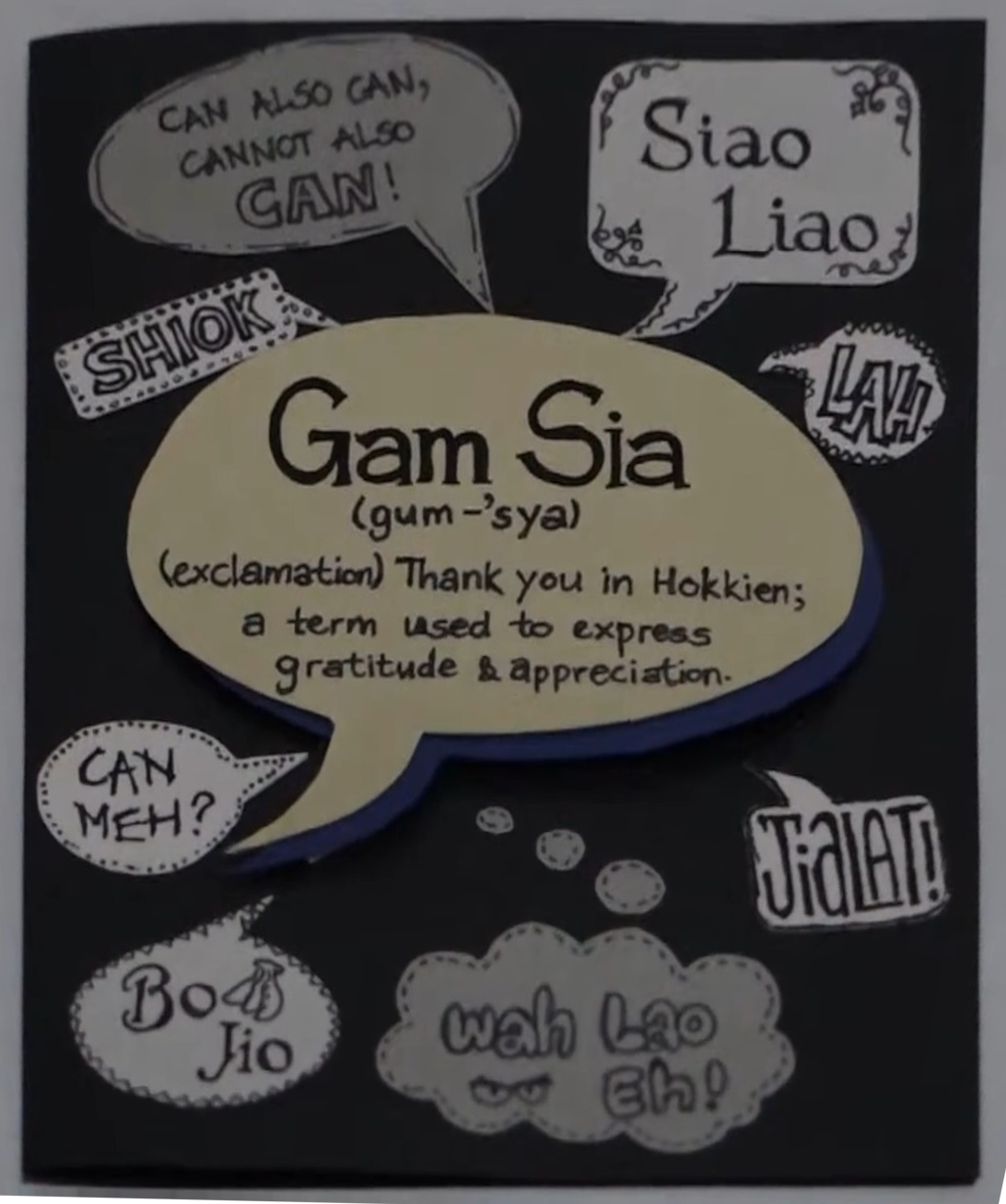
- A greeting card featuring Singlish terms
- Native to: Singapore
- Language family: Indo-European: Germanic; West Germanic; Ingvaeonic; Anglo-Frisian; Anglic; English; Southeast Asian English; Singapore English; Singlish
- Writing system: Latin

Language codes
- ISO 639-3: –
- Glottolog: sing1272
- IETF: cpe-SG

Singlish (a portmanteau of Singapore and English), formally known as Colloquial Singaporean English (CSE) or Singapore Colloquial English (SCE), is an English-based contact language originating in Singapore, and an informal register of Singapore English used between Singaporeans in colloquial contexts.

It linguistically resembles a creole, but its status as a creole is academically disputed. Singlish arose out of contact between speakers of different languages, mainly comprising different English varieties, different Malay varieties such as Baba Malay and Bazaar Malay, and different Chinese varieties such as Cantonese, Hokkien, Mandarin, and Teochew. Singlish and Standard Singapore English were modelled by academics as part of a creole continuum from 1975 to 1989, but were treated distinctly from 1990 as diglossia, with speakers employing code-switching. As opposed to the standard variety, Singlish is mostly used in informal situations. Driven by a shared history and close geography, Manglish of Malaysia closely mirrors Singlish, though there are subtle differences in vocabulary between the two.

The term Singlish first appeared in newspapers and academic discourse in 1975. Singlish was initially perceived as a threat by the government; Singlish advertisements were banned from 1993, multiple political leaders spoke out against it such as by Lee Kuan Yew in 1999, and the Speak Good English Movement (SGEM) was launched to discourage Singlish in 2000. From the 2010s, Singlish became more accepted; SGEM adjusted their goal to differentiate English and Singlish, Singlish advertisements reappeared, and government organisations such as the Singapore Tourism Board used Singlish. According to Mie Hiramoto, an associate professor at the National University of Singapore (NUS), this shift in stance was driven by a surge in patriotism sparked by the 50th National Day celebrations and the death of Lee Kuan Yew in 2015. Ng E-Ching, an English lecturer at NUS, said that this trend coincided with a growing sense of pride in Singaporean identity. Since the 2010s, it has garnered greater international attention and is frequently used by foreign artists and celebrities during local concerts or visits to embrace the local culture.

The pronunciation of Singlish is influenced by the race of the speaker and formality context. It is syllable-timed and contains tonal words. The grammar of Singlish includes topic-prominence, omission of the word be, reduplication of words, and discourse particles, which is a distinguishing feature of Singlish, such as ah, lah, and what. The vocabulary of Singlish is based on British English, with most loanwords from Malay and Hokkien, and an increasing influence from Mandarin. The Oxford English Dictionary has added Singlish words, such as lah in its debut in 2000, kiasu in 2007, and kaypoh in 2026.

== Classification ==
=== Nomenclature ===
The term Singaporean English is used extremely rarely, compared to Singlish and Singapore English, as it has pejorative connotations showing something "typical" of a Singaporean, according to Tan Ying-Ying. In literature, distinctions are made between higher and lower registers of the language, but the names used to refer to them varies by scholar, which is summarised in a table below.

Higher register	Lower register
Standard Singapore English (SSE)	Colloquial Singapore English (CSE) or Singapore Colloquial English (SCE)
Singapore English	Singlish
International Singapore English	Local Singapore English

=== Contrasting against standard English ===
==== Creole continuum ====
Platt's illustration of the creole continuum in Singapore

From 1975 to 1989, following John Platt's studies, scholars made no distinction between Singapore English and Singlish, explaining differences with a creole continuum, focusing on class and education differences.

In the model, Singlish and English in Singapore exist along a creole continuum, ranging from standard English with local pronunciation on one end, to the most colloquial registers of Singlish on the other. The acrolect is very similar to standard English as spoken in other English-speaking countries, with some differences in pronunciation, while basilectal speech is characteristic of less educated working-class Singaporeans, and a product of imperfect learning. Intermediate lects are named the mesolect.

According to Tan Ying-Ying, it is an outdated misconception, inappropriately tying class and education to the variety spoken. According to Tan Siew Imm, Singapore English was negatively considered as erroneous and non-standard by scholars during this period, and views changed starting from the 1980s, recognizing it as a local variety of English. Leimgruber writes that the model falsely assumes that all Singaporeans can speak Singlish, and fails to account for existing attitudes contrasting two forms of English, such as in the Speak Good English Movement.

==== Diglossia ====
Leimgruber's illustration of diglossia in Singapore

From 1990, following Anthea Fraser Gupta's studies, scholars made a distinction between the two varieties, explaining differences with diglossia between two varieties, focusing on the conscious choice of style by speakers.

Gupta differentiates the two varieties, by observing features of Singlish grammar, such as the existence of discourse particles, verb groups without subjects, conditional clauses without a subordinating conjunction, and omission of be, and features of standard English, such as subject-auxiliary inversion in interrogatives, use of inflexions for nouns and verbs, and "complex" verb groups involving modal auxiliaries.

Lubna Alsagoff, however, describes the diglossia model being too narrowly categorised, and says that Singlish and standard English are points of reference of a "variational space" of language, with speakers style-shifting depending on the speech situation. Leimgruber writes that it is not compatible with the traditional understanding of diglossia put forward by Charles A. Ferguson, where the low variety is native for the community regardless of social status, and no code-switching to the high variety occurs as the varieties are restricted to their own domains. Leimgruber agreed with the diglossia model, evidencing two distinct varieties with statistical differences in the usage of discourse particles and existential clauses.

=== Status as a creole ===
Following David DeCamp's research on pidgins and creoles in 1971, scholars described English in Singapore as a pidgin. Kenneth Ong of the Nanyang Technological University wrote that Singlish originated from an English-based pidgin. David Yoong, a linguist from La Trobe University, wrote that Singlish is an English-based creole in 2009. Writers from news outlets such as The New York Times, The Straits Times, Time Out, South China Morning Post, and AsiaOne, have written that Singlish is a creole.

In 1995, Jacques et al. described Singlish as an "extended pidgin", which resembles a creole and was only beginning to gain native speakers then. According to John Platt, Singlish is a "creoloid", stating that it had a similar structure to creoles, being used as a lingua franca inter-ethnically and natively, but did not develop from a pidgin. Ansaldo says that the term "creoloid" is controversial as it is not a "developed" terminology, and is not structurally definable. Bao Zhiming writes that these views were influenced by research on pidgins and creoles at the time.

According to Bao Zhiming, Singlish is not a creole due to the lack of a pidgin predecessor and English having been introduced through education. According to David Bloom, English in Singapore cannot be described with a creole continuum, because the oldest variety of English spoken was a standard form.

Ansaldo writes that ideas from creolisation may be used to describe how different languages played a role in the formation of English in Singapore, but should not be treated to narrowly describe Singlish as being a creole. Gupta uses terminology from creology, citing its usefulness outside of its classification, which she abstains from. Ansaldo writes that the labelling of Singlish as a creole or a "new variety of English" does not have linguistic implications, and instead has more sociohistorical and political implications. Alsagoff and Jakob Leimgruber said that its classification of a pidgin, creole or "New English" was not an interesting question.

=== Schneider's dynamic model ===
The five evolutionary stages in Schneider's dynamic model

In Schneider's dynamic model, by 2007, Singapore reached the fourth stage of "endonormative stabilization" out of five stages in English language evolution, due to a general acceptance of speaking, an expression of pride, and representativeness of a national identity. In 2010, Bokhorst-Heng et al. agreed with the classification, citing the increased confidence and sense of ownership in the youths over Singlish and English in Singapore. In 2015, Tan Siew Imm agreed with the classification, citing the increasing body of research of English in Singapore, and an increased acceptability of "high variety" usage in official contexts except news and scripted dialogue, despite attempts to discourage linguistic features local to Singapore.

Bao Zhiming writes that while Schneider's dynamic model provides a new perspective of New Englishes, it ignores pidgins and creoles despite being well known in contact linguistics, saying that New Englishes are distinct from English-lexified pidgins and creoles.

== History ==
=== Developmental origin ===
Before the arrival of the British, Baba Malay, a creole from Malay and Hokkien, was spoken by wealthy Peranakans, and Bazaar Malay, a pidginpredominantly from Malay and Hokkien, was spoken interethnically. English was also present, likely brought over from Malacca according to Ansaldo.

By the 1830s, British people arrived and the English language education was established in Singapore, initially dominated by Baba Malay and Kristang-speaking students, both of which are Malay-based contact languages, and later dominated by the Chinese population by 1921, who spoke non-Mandarin varieties. After girls started to gain access to English-language education, English became increasingly used as a native language, starting from around the 1930s. Education taught in English gradually increased, overtaking education in Chinese in 1955, and by 1984, all education in Singapore was taught in English, with the exception of foreign community schools. English was prioritised by the government for economic development, and had greater prestige. In 1994, Singlish was being pioneered by children, according to Gupta.

The schools were initially dominated by European students and teachers, who taught in various varieties of Eurasian English including British English, which likely formed the basis of Singapore English after going through dialect levelling, according to Tan Ying-Ying. Locally educated teachers started taking over, after the establishment of the schools, which account for the large influence of Malay and non-Mandarin varieties' influence on Singlish according to Rebecca Starr, an associate professor at the National University of Singapore (NUS). Over the twentieth century, the Peranakans increasingly used English at home, which mixed with Baba Malay. A vernacular version of Malay, based on Bazaar Malay or Baba Malay, was used extensively during conversations in English school. Through education under the bilingual policy, most Chinese Singaporeans focused on and spoke English instead of Mandarin, which Jock Onn Wong described as a "pragmatic" decision to enable race-agnostic communication.

The development of Singlish was also accelerated by National Service, which created rapport and was a common language when some could not understand English. Its ethnic neutrality, lack of mutual intelligibility between Chinese varieties, and the bilingual policy also accelerated its development; Schneider says that the bilingual policy contributed the most to its development.

According to Gupta, given the history, Singlish likely arose from varieties of standard English, such as Eurasian, Indian, British and American English, varieties of Chinese, such as Hokkien, Teochew and Cantonese, and a variety of Malay, such as Bazaar or Baba Malay, and possibly Kristang, the Portuguese creole. According to Tan Ying-Ying, Singlish mostly comprises English, Bazaar Malay, Hokkien, some Cantonese, some Tamil, and increasingly Mandarin. According to Wong, Singlish arose due to the Speak Mandarin Campaign restricting non-Mandarin varieties and a need to express Southern Chinese cultural values not possible in English. According to Lisa Lim, the Peranakans had the greatest influence on Singlish, having developed the prosodic patterns and introduced tonal words to English.

=== First use ===
In published newspapers, the term Singapore English was first recorded on 22 August 1907 in Eastern Daily Mail and Straits Morning Advertiser. It was used in the headline of an opinion piece defending Singaporean children whose spoken English was imperfect, and comparing it to an Eton College headmaster's criticism of the "mixture of Yorkshire, Cockney and Australian" heard in the English of London.

The word Singlish was first recorded on 20 July 1975 in New Nation. It was written by Chandy in response to a "Singapore English" class being taught at the University of Singapore, signing off with "What? Singlish lah!" In academics, Singlish was first recorded in 1975, by John T. Platt.

=== Initial perception as a threat ===
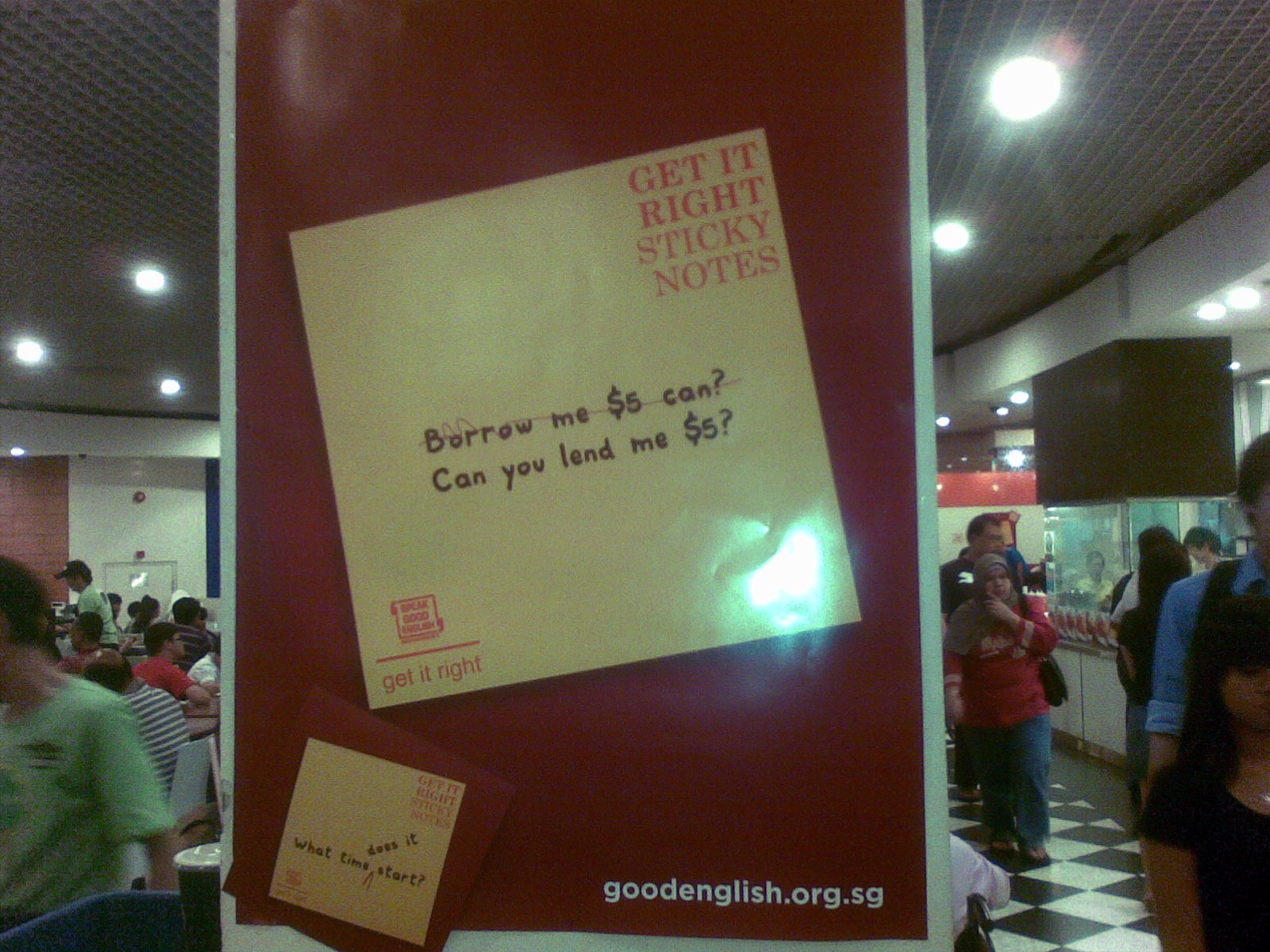
Speak Good English Movement's "Get It Right" poster at a food court on 31 October 2010

Singlish was initially regarded as a threat to Singapore; the word Singlish had derogatory connotations, and was used "half-jokingly" according to Platt. In 1974, Dick Lee's song, "Fried Rice Paradise", which employed Singlish, was banned due to an "improper use of English". Singlish was deemed grammatically incorrect by the Singapore Broadcasting Corporation (SBC). In 1999, the sitcom Phua Chu Kang Pte Ltd and its character Phua Chu Kang (PCK) was singled out by prime minister Goh Chok Tong, warning against its use of Singlish and effects on society it could have, leading the show to reduce Singlish use. According to David Wong, the chairman of the Speak Good English Movement (SGEM), Singlish was becoming a patriotic symbol during PCK's stint.

In 2000, the SGEM was launched, an annual campaign to encourage standard English and discourage Singlish, characterising it as "bad English", fearing that it would sabotage Singapore's global economic success. Festivals were conducted holding discussions and comedy, and free automated telephone lessons on English were provided. It had limited success, according to Tessa Wong of BBC. The SGEM was met with counter-campaigns by "well-educated" people, according to Tan Ying-Ying, such as the "Save Our Singlish Campaign", the "Speak Good Singlish Movement" and the "Sticker Lady", Sam Lo, who pasted Singlish stickers on traffic lights.

In 1991, a scratch-and-win advertisement by Kodak using Singlish for persuasion, described as "notorious" by The Straits Times, received backlash from viewers for using Singlish, who felt that it represented Singaporeans negatively. There was an increasing use of Singlish by SBC, such as in radio commercials and television programmes.

From August 1993, Singlish commercials were banned on radio and television, and Singlish programmes were restricted on television, after controversy with SBC's use of Singlish, with people saying that it encouraged Singaporeans to speak badly. Singlish in advertisements was largely avoided until 2009. According to Cheng et al. in 2008, they only found Long John Silver's using Singlish promotionally during the duration of the ban. Most advertisers were unfazed by the ban, as only a minority of advertisements used Singlish regardless of the ban, according to Ivan Chong, the president of an umbrella organisation of advertising. However, a small number of advertisers said that it restricted creative freedom and more flexibility should be given.

Despite the ban, Singlish was also used in an awareness campaign for the SARS outbreak by PCK in 2003, due to the special occasion of a health emergency. According to Liew Kai Khiun, a professor at Nanyang Technological University, the campaign was effective, and remained remembered 17 years later. After a few months, it was condemned by Goh Chok Tong again for the use of Singlish.

In 1999, Lee Kuan Yew had described Singlish as "a handicap [they] must not wish upon Singaporeans", as he promoted English for global communication and understanding. In 2001, Lee Hsien Loong said in the SGEM that the Singaporean population was insufficient to speak a globally incomprehensible language, and that if Singlish were normalised, it will no longer be interesting or notable.

Roy Tan wrote to The Straits Times warning against promoting Singlish, citing Singaporeans' inability to code-switch, and Yagger wrote to Project Eyeball that some well-educated Singaporeans could not tell that they were using imperfect English. Dsuen wrote to Project Eyeball that Singlish concealed a shameful lacklustre ability to use English. Simon Ng of Today wrote that children could not differentiate Singlish and standard English. Chan Khim Soo of The Business Times wrote that Singlish and English could not co-exist. Jaime Ee of The Business Times wrote that the use of Singlish by the English-educated was condescending to the Chinese-educated, as it was mockery of how they spoke. Nicholas Lee, a Singaporean actor, said that only ah beng characters should be portrayed speaking Singlish. According to The Straits Times, some Singaporeans argued that it gave foreigners a negative impression of Singapore as a country that could not speak English, while Chan wrote that it would make Singapore a target of comedic ridicule.

Despite the official stance against Singlish, in 2006, the English-speaking middle-class was the largest proponent of Singlish, using it to show an identity and authenticity. Gwee Li Sui wrote to The New York Times that their stance made Singlish popular among the youth. Lee Kheng Hock wrote to The Straits Times that Singlish showed confidence in the nation, and built rapport between Singaporeans. According to The Straits Times, some Singaporeans saw no problem as it was a real representation of language use in Singapore. Dick Lee said that Singapore would be deprived of culture without Singlish.

Freddie Sng and Lai Yong wrote to The Straits Times that it gave Singapore a differentiating factor and that it was more easily learnable by the less-educated due to being rooted in Chinese and Malay. Prithpal Singh of Today wrote that allowed communication which was otherwise impossible in his family. Anthony Yeo wrote to The Straits Times that Singlish was crucial for non-English speaking business makers.

Lynn Lee wrote that it was even more offensive to speak in a fake and unrepresentative American accent on television. Ong Sor Fern wrote to The Straits Times that world Englishes are all different and glorifying Westerners' English was indicative of an inferiority complex. Wong Kim Hoh of The Straits Times wrote that SBC themselves used Singlish elements when dubbing Chinese shows into English to bring authenticity.

Catherine Lim, an author, said that Singlish should be differentiated from English with bad grammar and pronunciation as a result of imperfect learning. Carolyn Wong wrote to Today that Singlish and English could co-exist, but teachers had to have a good command of English. Gupta wrote that the appropriate situations for Singlish and standard English should be taught, instead of presenting standard English as a replacement for Singlish which would fail. Josh Gav wrote to Project Eyeball wrote that Singlish should be left to evolve by itself. Daniel Lee wrote to Project Eyeball that Singaporeans were becoming victims of language policies, quoting the Speak Mandarin Campaign which had encouraged Mandarin over non-Mandarin varieties for economic opportunities.

=== Increased acceptance ===
From the 2010s, it received greater global interest and became more celebrated and accepted in Singapore. According to Mie Hiramoto, an associate professor at NUS, the change in stance was propelled by the death of Lee Kuan Yew and the SG50 celebrations, both of which happened in 2015. According to Ng E-Ching, an English lecturer at NUS, the increased use of Singlish accompanied the increased reputation of being Singaporean.

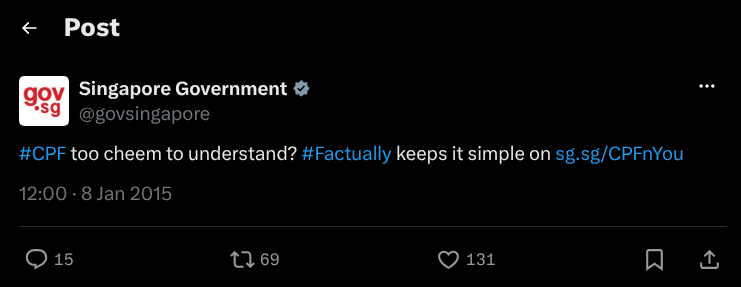
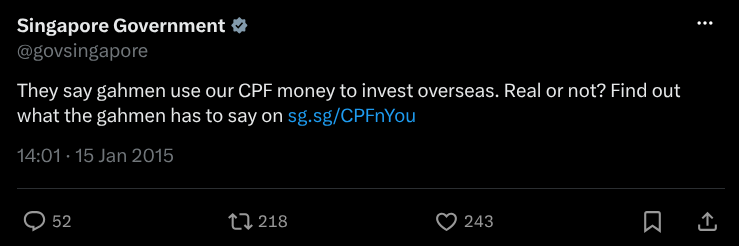
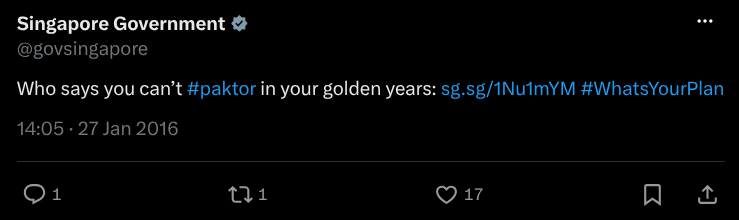
Governmental tweets, using cheem meaning profound in 2015 (top), gahmen meaning government in 2015 (middle), and paktor meaning date in 2016 (bottom)

After a courtesy campaign by PCK in 2009, which featured a reduced use of Singlish, more advertisements started appearing using Singlish, such as McDonald's. In 2015, the government themselves became more open to Singlish usage in advertisements, such as in promoting the Central Provident Fund, and the SG50 National Day celebrations which portrayed lah and chope using floats. Governmental tweets in Singlish in January 2015 was met with public outcry, but by January 2016, it did not attract attention. Organisations such as Mediacorp, National Heritage Board and the Singapore Tourist Board used Singlish. Organisations such as the Singapore Police Force also used Singlish, but sparingly when reaching a wider audience with more relatability and ease was deemed appropriate.

By 2016, the SGEM had adjusted their stance to encourage those who only speak Singlish to also speak standard English and sought to differentiate Singlish and standard English, acknowledging "broken English" as a separate matter. Goh Eck Kheng, the chairman of the SGEM, acknowledged that Singlish was part of the Singaporean identity. For example, in 2022, the SGEM created a TikTok campaign educating people on code-switching. Gwee Li Sui, a literary critic, wrote that Singlish survived the SGEM as it was used across ethnic and socioeconomic groups, unlike non-Mandarin varieties, which reduced in usage due to the Speak Mandarin Campaign.

During the COVID-19 pandemic, Singlish educational raps, featuring figures such as PCK, went viral and caught the attention of international media. International viewers urged their countries to create similar music. According to Rebecca Ratcliffe of The Guardian, the video was described as "lovable cringe" and "surprisingly informative", and attracted concerns of overplaying. Julia Chatterley of BBC commended the music video in an interview with Vivian Balakrishnan. Tracy Lee of Channel NewsAsia wrote that it was effective, but insulting to intelligence and embarrassing.

A Singlish Wordle spin-off titled "Word-leh" was created by Sha-Mayn Teh, which Yamini Chinnuswamy of The Straits Times described as a "sensation" in 2022. An online Singlish dictionary titled "Chimbridge", was created in 2024 by Daniel Goh. According to Lionel Wee of the National University of Singapore, the creation of "Word-leh" and "Chimbridge" indicated an increased interest among younger Singaporeans of Singlish.

In 2012, during a naturalization ceremony, Hsien Loong endorsed the use of Singlish to integrate with society, and in 2015, he said, using some Singlish, that he was glad of the increased confidence in Singapore's identity. Paddy Rangappa wrote to The Straits Times that Singlish was a way of Singaporeans displaying ownership of English, comparing it to other dialects like Cockney English. Wee did not blame the government for its measures against Singlish given the historical context, but said that they over-prioritised development over culture. Singlish better reflected the "ethnic harmony" in Singapore compared to Bazaar Malay, albeit with an under-representation of the Indian languages, according to Tan Ying-Ying. Irwan Jamil wrote to The Straits Times that Singlish is the product of Singapore's multilingual past and is worthy of study. An increasing majority of Singaporeans from surveys done in 2018 and 2024 regarded Singlish as a national identity and important part of culture, but Indians were the least likely to agree compared to the Chinese and Malays. In 2024, younger Singaporeans were most comfortable in using Singlish and most disapproving of policies that curb Singlish.

Peter Tan, a lecturer of English language and literature from NUS, said that Singlish usage is acceptable as long as standard English was taught well in schools. Luke Lu, a sociolinguist, wrote that Singlish should be used as a teaching resource to show the difference between Singlish and English. Tan Siew Imm, a linguist from the University of Canberra, wrote that multi-word verbs local to Singapore, such as discuss about, emphasise on, and raise up, were well-formed and should be codified instead of being classified as learner errors, which would be more helpful for academic and educational purposes than making references to British English norms. Wong Jock Onn wrote that both languages embodied different cultures, whose differences should be taught, such as the tendency to exaggerate in Singlish and tendency to understate in English. Zaqy Mohamad, then chairman of the Government Parliamentary Committee of Communications and Information, said that flexibility should be given to creative advertisements, in response to Tower Transit Singapore using Singlish on their advertisements in their buses.

Despite the weakened stance against Singlish, in 2016, Eugene Tan, an associate professor of law at the Singapore Management University, warned against glorifying Singlish due to bad economic effects; according to Seah Jin Wah, an "alarming" number of working Singaporeans struggled in using English. Eugene compared it against cities like Colombo, Manila and Rangoon, which lost economic power due to a deteriorating standard of English. Johann Loh, the founder of Academia English & Writing Centre, wrote that the "elite" can manipulate working-class Singaporeans by using Singlish, reinforcing class structures, describing it as "false camaraderie" and doublespeak. Roy Tan wrote to The Straits Times that Singlish should not be encouraged nor discouraged, but efforts should be directed to improving language proficiency used for world trade.

Seah Jin Wah wrote to The Straits Times that Singlish made it hard to distinguish between bad English and Singlish, and Eugene Tan warned against using Singlish as a reason for poor English command. Lee Hsien Loong and Goh Eck Kheng said that Singlish will hinder English learning, which Peter Tan disagreed with, saying that interference may occur, but proficiency cannot be affected as language acquisition cannot be reversed, and Lu says that there is no scientific evidence that Singlish hinders English learning. Jonathan Wong wrote to The Straits Times that advocates of Singlish are usually those who can code-switch, which is unrepresentative of the population. Johann Loh wrote that Singlish was a mockery of how poorer people spoke when exaggerated for comedy. In 2017, Ong Siew Chey wrote to The Straits Times disapproving the use of Singlish, saying that Singlish was for those who did not learn proper English, which was met with backlash in the comment section, with people saying that it gave them an identity.

== Usage in society ==
=== Code-switching ===
According to Peter Tan and Daniel Tan, by 2016, secondary school students were aware of the situations that standard English and Singlish are appropriate for. In informal settings, such as during conversation with friends, or transactions in kopitiams and shopping malls, Singlish is used without restriction. In a 2024 study, 71.1% of Singaporeans said that it was appropriate to use Singlish with friends. However, many Singaporeans hold a strong attitude against Singlish in formal settings.

In Singaporean schools, although Singlish is officially discouraged, there is often code-switching present in the classroom. This is inevitable given that Singlish is the home language of many students, and many teachers themselves are comfortable with the variety. In a 2024 study, 57.6% of Singaporeans said that it was inappropriate for teachers to use Singlish in class.

In many white-collar workplaces, Singlish is avoided in formal contexts, especially at job interviews, meetings with clients, presentations or meetings, where standard English is preferred, due to clarity, accessibility and being understood internationally. In a 2024 study, 57.6% of Singaporeans said that it was inappropriate to use Singlish in e-mails, and 60.1% of Singaporeans said it was inappropriate for use in governmental speeches.

=== In Singaporean culture ===
"Fried Rice Paradise", a song using Singlish by Dick Lee in 1974, received a TV adaptation and a musical theatre adaptation. Its ban due to "broken English" is well-known in Singapore's history, according to Faith Leong and Dynn Othman of Channel NewsAsia. "Why U So Like Dat?", another song using Singlish by Siva Choy in 1991, sold 5,000 cassettes in three weeks, and was frequently played on radios.

Beauty World (1988) written by Chiang and scored by Lee, described as Singapore's first major musical by Julia Goh of The New Paper, was performed in Singapore, using some Singlish in the supporting characters' dialogue. In 2005, it was performed at the University of Chicago. Fried Rice Paradise (1991) was also written by Lee using Singlish. It almost sold out about 18,000 tickets to 20 shows, being positively received by the audience according to Goh, such as through the insertion of a "local flavour". In 1994, the most popular theatre shows were those that used Singlish, such as Private Parts by Michael Chiang, outperforming other shows like Les Misérables and Cats.

Singlish also saw commodification by 2026, with various retailers selling items with Singlish designs, such as cushion covers, tote bags, mugs, stickers, and diary folders.

=== In international media ===
Since the 2020s, foreign artistes became increasingly familiar with Singlish, incorporating local terms into their concerts in Singapore to build affinity with Singaporean concertgoers and acknowledge its mark on Singaporean identity. Notable examples include Taylor Swift's Eras Tour, as well as performances by k-pop girl groups I-dle and Le Sserafim, and the cantopop boy band Mirror, among other examples.

Posts created by international people, teaching and talking about Singlish, also saw interest in social media such as Instagram and TikTok by 2026. Brian Lee, an associate professor from the Singapore University of Social Sciences wrote that the popularity of such videos come from a sense of collaborativeness, as viewers feel recognised of their language, amplified by their pride in Singaporean heritage.

Echo from Overwatch was released in April 2020, voiced by a Jeannie Bolet, a British voice actor, whose backstory was written to be Singaporean. Echo used Singlish voice lines such as shiok and alamak. Marion Frayna of Geek Culture praised Blizzard, the company of Overwatch, for representing Singapore well, through its culture and language. However, some online users disapproved of Echo's overt foreignness in pronunciation, with some describing it as "westernised". Tarvin Gill of Mashable described it as "an English person trying very hard to fit in". Blizzard re-recorded her voice lines in August 2020 to sound more Singaporean, after ONE Esports, a Singaporean company, released a video correcting her voice lines.

=== In literature ===
In 1998, literature using Singlish was not scrutinised by the public. Freddie Sng and Lai Yong wrote to The Straits Times that literature in Singlish felt more convincing and richer in culture. Sylvia Toh Paik Choo, a Singaporean humour writer, was the first to publish books on Singlish in Eh Goondu! (1982) and Lagi Goondu! (1986), despite not speaking Singlish. In 2000, VJ Times published Singlish to English: Basic Grammar Guide, a Singlish textbook.

The Three Little Pigs Lah (2013) by Casey Chen, based on "The Three Little Pigs", used Singlish to illustrate its humour. Sarong Party Girls (2016) by Cheryl Tan, supported by the National Arts Council, explored sexism, and the materialistic and traditional Singaporean society, using Singlish to give the protagonist character and personality. Spiaking Singlish: A companion to how Singaporeans Communicate (2017) by Gwee Li Sui was written in and about Singlish, hoping that he can normalise Singlish writing, and show its possibility of non-humorous usage.

In 2002, Colin Goh and Woo Yen Yen published the Coxford Singlish Dictionary, described as "lighthearted" by James Harbeck of BBC. In 2004, Jack Lee published A Dictionary of Singlish and Singapore English, an online resource, after encountering the language in National Service, including etymologies and attested sentences. In 2024, Daniel Goh launched an online dictionary, titled Chimbridge Dictionary of Singlish and Singapore English, which filled the gaps in existing works by including etymologies. In the Oxford English Dictionary, words such as lah and sinseh were included in its debut in March 2000. Kiasu was added in 2007 and was selected as the word of the day on 11 February 2015. In 2016, it added 19 new terms including ang moh, shiok and sabo, and in 2026, it added 11 more, including BTO, wayang and kaypoh.

=== In academics ===
According to Tan Siew Imm, Singlish is among the most well-researched second-language varieties of English. By 2017, Singlish was considered by linguists to be an independent language with its own systematic grammar, being studied by at least seven universities internationally. For example, in 2017, Neil Myler of the Boston University offered a course on accents, dialects and society, which introduced Singlish to 60 students, and from 2007, Leimgruber introduced Singlish in sociolinguistics classes. Cynthia Siew, a psycholinguist from the National University of Singapore, developed "A Small World of Singlish Words", a map of words including Singlish terminology, formed using a word association task.

=== In artificial intelligence ===
According to Chng Eng Siong, a professor at the Nanyang Technological University, Singlish is challenging for artificial intelligence models due to the vocabulary, accent, and slang, and is neglected due to the small population of Singapore. In 2024, a healthtech project named the AI Singapore Speech Lab, created a large language model that recognised Singlish, with a funding of under S$5 million over five years, and was used by organisations such as the Singapore Civil Defence Force. In 2025, the Agency for Science, Technology and Research worked on developing a large language model to tackle transcription of languages in Singapore, such as Singlish, after recognising gaps in existing large language models, as a tool for the financial sector to provide better customer service.

== Phonology ==
=== Variation ===
Speech example
A speech by a 20s female Singaporean Chinese, published in 2018 in National Speech Corpus by the Infocomm Media Development Authority (IMDA)

Speech example
A speech by a 20s female Singaporean Malay, published in 2018 in National Speech Corpus by IMDA

Speech example
A speech by a 20s male Singaporean Indian, published in 2018 in National Speech Corpus by IMDA

Singlish pronunciation, while built on a base of British English, is heavily influenced by Malay, Hokkien and Cantonese. There are variations within Singlish, both geographically and ethnically. Chinese, Native Malays, Indians, Eurasians, and other ethnic groups in Singapore all have distinct accents, and the accentedness depends on factors such as formality of the context and language dominance of the speaker. Singaporeans are able to reliably identify the ethnicity of a speaker in colloquial speech, but not reliably in formal speech, using features such as the intonation contour or segmental information above 400 Hz. Pronunciation of Singlish is mostly similar to Singapore English.

=== Consonants ===
The consonants in Singlish are given below:

	Labial		Dental		Alveolar		Post- alveolar		Palatal	Velar		Glottal
Nasal		m				n					ŋ	
Stop / Affricate	p	b			t	d	tʃ	dʒ		k	ɡ	
Fricative	f	v	(θ	ð)	s	z	ʃ	ʒ				h
Approximant						l		ɹ	j		w	

Before a vowel, the dental fricatives, /θ/ and /ð/ are realised as /t/ and /d/ respectively, so thin is pronounced [tin] and this is pronounced [dis], with variability among speakers; some may still pronounce it with /θ/ and /ð/. After a vowel, /θ/ is realised as /f/, so birth is pronounced [bəf]. In careful speech, the original forms of /θ/ and /ð/ are better preserved, due to better awareness of the feature. Pronunciation using /θ/ and /ð/ is associated with greater formality and prestige.

The postvocalic /r/ occurs more in younger Singlish speakers, women, and in careful speech, in perception of the feature being more "correct", possibly due to greater exposure to American media or how the words were spelled with an "r". In 2007, about 20 per cent of university undergraduates sometimes use this American-style pre-consonantal [ɹ] when reading a passage.

The intervocalic /t/ is sometimes but rarely pronounced flapped, by younger speakers, perceiving it as a "correct" form, despite the informality associated with the feature by Americans. Poedjosoedarmo writes that the flapped /t/ and postvocalic /r/ might be due to exposure to American media.

Chinese speakers are the only ethnic group that sometimes conflate /r/ and /l/, and are also the only group that replace /il/ with /iu/, which Gloria Poedjosoedarmo attributed to lower proficiency of the speakers. A postvocalic /l/ is also sometimes replaced with a postvocalic /r/, such as measles being pronounced as /miːzərz/.

- Aspiration: Onset /p/, /t/ and /k/ are sometimes unaspirated, especially among Malays. Aspiration is retained in loanwords from Chinese.
- L-vocalisation: Word-final or preconsonantal /l/, as in mail – realised as a dark l in Received Pronunciation and American English – is often so velarised in Singlish that it approaches a high back vowel, e.g. sale [seɤ̯ ~ seu̯]. The sound tends to be lost after the back vowels /ɔ, o, u/, and sometimes /ə/, which makes mall and more, wall and war, and Saul and saw homophones. This is not the case for some speakers with Tamil or Malay accents who may use clear or dark "l"s in these environments instead.
- Lack of syllabic consonants: Sequences like /ən/ or /əm/ are never syllabic consonants in Singlish, hence taken [ˈtekən], never *[ˈtekn̩].
- Glottal stop insertion: A glottal stop [ʔ] may be inserted at the beginning of words starting with a vowel, as in German. As a result, final consonants do not experience liaison, i.e. run onto the next word. For example, "ran out of eggs" is realised as [ɹɛn ʔau̯t ʔɔf ʔeks] for some speakers (compare General American [ɹɛən‿aʊɾ‿əv‿ɛɡz]), with glottal stops in lieu of null onsets.
- Glottal replacement: Though uncommon in modern speakers, a glottal stop [ʔ] may replace final stop consonants (except /p, b/), especially in fast-paced speech: Goodwood Park becomes Gu'-wu' Pa' [ˈɡuʔ ˈwuʔ ˈpaʔ], exist is realised as [ɛʔˈzist], and there may be a glottal stop at the end of words like back and out.
- Final-obstruent devoicing: Word-finally, the distinction between voiced and voiceless sounds, i.e. /s/ – /z/, /t/ – /d/, etc., is sometimes not maintained. As a result, cease = seize /sis/ and race = raise /res/ for some speakers.
- Cluster reduction: Final consonant clusters may simplify, especially in fast speech. In general, plosives, especially /t/ and /d/, are lost if they come after another consonant that is non-lateral, e.g. want = one /wan/, tact = tack /tɛk/. Additionally, /k/ may be deleted after /s/, e.g. flask /flas/.

=== Vowels ===
According to Bao Zhiming, the following are the vowels in Singlish:

	Front	Central	Back
Close	i		u
Mid	(e)	ə	(o)
Mid	ɛ	ə	ɔ
Open	(æ)		ɑ
Diphthongs	ai au ɔi iə uə		

According to Jakob Leimgruber, the following are the vowels in Singlish:

	Front	Central	Back
Close	i		u
Mid	e	ə	o
Mid	ɛ	ə	ɔ
Open		a	
Diphthongs	ai au ɔi iə uə		

Broadly speaking, there is a one-to-many mapping of Singlish vowel phonemes to British Received Pronunciation vowel phonemes, with a few exceptions (as discussed below, with regard to egg and peg). The following describes a typical system.

At the acrolectal level, the merged vowel phonemes are distinguished to some extent. These speakers make a distinction between the tense vowels /i, u/ (FLEECE, GOOSE) and the lax vowels /ɪ, ʊ/ (KIT, FOOT) respectively. No distinction is made with the length of the vowel between /iː/ and /ɪ/. Words using /eɪ/ such as spade and /əʊ/ such as know in Received Pronunciation are pronounced more closely to a monophthong regardless of their race, as a mark of identity. Usage of its diphthongal form is associated with high status but low in solidarity.

Words that are normally rendered with /ɑː/ in British English, such as grass, are replaced with /æ/ with a greater frequency by younger Singlish speakers, women, and in careful speech, due to a greater prestige associated with /æ/. Poedjosoedarmo writes that the usage of /æ/ might be due to exposure to American media.

Words starting with a /w/, such as want and wander, is pronounced with a /ʌ/, while other words that start with /w/, such as wash and watch, are pronounced with a /ɒ/.

/æ/, as in bat, and /e/, as in bet, (or equivalently, /æ/ and /ɛ/,) are indistinguishable in casual speech, but distinguishable with conscious effort, with the formality of the situation having no effect. Words such as red can be realised with either vowel. Eurasians and Indians are most likely to maintain distinguishability between /æ/ and /e/, while Malays are the least likely. Which vowel a word is realised with is not predictable with external varieties of English such as British English.

The /ʊə/ diphthong is realised as a /ɔː/ after a /j/; words such as tour, poor, and sure contain the /ʊə/ diphthong, but cure and pure contain /ɔː/ instead. This is the exact opposite of British English, where the vowel is pronounced as a /ɔː/, unless it occurs after a /j/, in which it becomes a /ʊə/.

- /ai/ remains /ai/ in Singlish, except when followed by /l/, in which case it is the monophthong /a/.
- Examples of words that have idiosyncratic pronunciations: flour /fla/ (expected: /flau.ə/ = flower); and their /ðja ⁓ dja/ (expected: /ðɛ ⁓ dɛ/ = there). Flour/flower and their/there are therefore not homophones in Singlish.
- Where other varieties of English have an unstressed /ə/, i.e. a reduced vowel, Singlish tends to use the full vowel based on orthography. This can be seen in words such as accept /ɛksɛp/, example /ɛ(k)sampə(l), ɛ(k)zampə(l)/, purchase /pətʃes/, maintenance /mɛntenəns, mentenəns/, presentation /prizɛnteʃən/, and so on. However, this does not mean that the reduced vowel /ə/ never occurs, as about and again have /ə/ in their first syllable. It seems that the letter 'a' is often pronounced /ə/, but the letter 'o' usually has a full vowel quality, especially in the con- prefix (control, consider, etc.). There is a greater tendency to use a full vowel in a syllable which is closed off with a final consonant, so a full vowel is much more likely at the start of absorb /ɛbzɔb/ than afford /əfɔd/.
- In loanwords from Hokkien that contain nasal vowels, the nasalisation is often kept – one prominent example being the mood particle hor, pronounced [hõ˨].

=== Tone and prosody ===
Pitch contour of a declarative sentence spoken by a Chinese Singaporean, from Chong (2012). Here, "aL" and "Ha" mark the left and right edges of an accentual phrase, and L* is a pitch accent falling on stressed syllables. The gradual downwards movement of pitch towards the end of the sentence is represented by the boundary tone L%.

Singlish is syllable-timed compared to most varieties of English, which are usually stress-timed. Its intonation is influenced by Malay, and the extent of its influence varies by the speaker's ethnicity. For instance, Malay Singaporean speech often has a later pitch movement in the intonation contour of an utterance, unlike that of Chinese and Indians.

The pronunciation of Singlish is described as having a "staccato" effect by multiple linguists such as Platt, and others also say it has a "sing-song quality", according to Adam Chong. However, Adam Brown says that it is a musical term with no linguistic definition. Brown attributed Singlish having shortened vowels, along with no stress-timing and liaison, to it being described as "staccato".

==== Stress ====
Stress is conveyed through pitch, loudness and length, but which parameters are used depends on the ethnic group: the Chinese use loudness and length, the Indian use loudness and pitch, and the Malay use all three parameters. Neutral stress and emphatic stress are undistinguished, except by the Indian, who vary duration for only emphatic stress. According to Lisa Lim, it is likely influenced by the local languages used by the ethnic group, citing how Sinitic languages already encode semantics in tone, leaving only loudness and length for stress.

Content words are typically stressed, and function words are typically unstressed with some exceptions. Repeated use of a content word do not undergo de-stressing unlike standard English. Demonstratives such as this and modals such as should receive stress. Sentence-final pronouns receive heavy stress. Similar stress is given to each syllable in most bisyllabic words such as language, with exceptions such as basic which has more stress on the first syllable. Trisyllabic words may have equal stress on all syllables, such as in continue, or on only some syllables, such as in the second syllable of remember. The final syllable of an utterance is often dragged out, similar to Malay, significantly more than British English, as an indicator of prominence, and may be analysed as a level tone.

Stress is used as a form of protecting one's turn to speak, regardless of the semantic value of the word it falls on. For instance, when hesitating to gather thoughts in an incomplete sentence, the last word of the incomplete phrase may be stressed. Because is also stressed often to signal that greater attention is to be paid to a following explanation. To end a thought, more prominence is given to the last word, regardless of the semantic information carried by the last word.

The position of a nucleus within an intonational phrase in Singlish is unclear, unlike British English. Speakers in Singapore do not distinguish compounds, like armchair, and phrases, like old chair, during stress assignment, assigning an increasing pitch for both. However, British speakers distinguish these, giving a decreasing pitch for compounds and an increasing pitch for phrases. Singlish employs more prominent syllables and assigns the same amount of stress to syllables following a prominent syllable, such as in enclitics, unlike American English.

==== Tonal words ====
Words of Sinitic origin retain their original tones in Singlish, such as kiasu which maintains its original Hokkien tones, with the exception of words that are loaned via English first, such as Taiwan, which is said without tone. Discourse particles, which occur phrase-finally, are also tonal, such as what, only occurring with a low tone, leh, only occurring with a high level tone, and lor, only occurring with a mid-level tone. The meaning of the word may also differ with the tone: Lah signals camarederie with a low falling tone, and obviousness or strong emotion with a high falling tone; while the interrogative ah expects a response with a rising tone, while a mid falling tone or low tone does not require a response.

==== Tone contour over syllables ====
Singlish is governed by pitch accent. It may be syllabically analysed using low, middle, and high tones. Tones do not glide gradually between tones, and instead move in sustained steps. Syllables with stress receive a middle tone according to Ng E-Ching, and an "L* pitch accent", referring to a drop in tone, according to Adam Chong. A low tone is assigned to the first syllable of a prosodic word if it is unstressed. A high tone is assigned to the last syllable of a prosodic word; some words such as watermelon may be split into water and melon, receiving a high tone at the end of water. Word-final high tones are a feature ultimately from indigenous Malay, through Bazaar Malay, with reinforcement from Baba Malay and Indian English. All other syllables are either given the middle tone or left unspecified.

==== Tone contour over words ====
Tones may also be analysed as occurring over an entire word, as opposed to a syllabic analysis. A rising tone is most commonly used, accompanied by a long sequence of rising tones, and occurs rarely in the final position, signalling incomplete information. It is also used to express a question, but with no connotations of rudeness unlike British English. A falling tone is used to emphasise a word or indicate the completion of a thought, which may mark the end of an intonational phrase. A lengthened falling tone additionally includes emotions such as disappointment. A rise-fall tone is used for emphasis, usually appearing in the final position, and may convey strong approval, strong disapproval, or surprise similar to British English. A level tone is used for filler words and signals an incomplete thought, possibly derived from Chinese. A rise-level tone, while rarer, is also used for an incomplete thought. A fall-level tone is used to express new information, or a viewpoint believed to be correct with an expectation of a comment from the speaker. A level-fall tone is used to put more emphasis on an emotion. The fall-rise tone is mostly unused in Singlish, possibly due to unfamiliarity, lack of social function, and sounding pompous.

Diane Chang and Lisa Lim attribute this intonational system as a major reason for why others encounter communication issues with Singlish speakers. For instance, bored speech in Singlish can be construed as being friendly, and disbelief can be construed as using sarcasm.

Prosodic structure of Singlish proposed by Chong

Accentual phrases, which may be a word or slightly longer, start with a low tone and end with a high tone. Intermediate and full intonational phrases are marked with a boundary tone, which can be low in declaratives and wh-questions and high in yes-no questions. A "boosted pitch" or "early booster" often occurs at the start of a sentence, such as in sentences that start with actually or I think, similar to the "high key" used in British English to signal a new topic, which give Singaporeans a significantly wider pitch range their British English speakers. David Deterding wrote that a prosodic unit begins with a boosted pitch and ends with a falling or rise-fall tone. Questions may end in more commonly, a falling tone, and less commonly, a rise-fall tone. Sharp falling tones are associated with strong disagreement or surprise. Imperatives and exclamations more commonly use a falling or rise-fall tone.

== Grammar ==
Parse tree of the cake John always buy one, with one analysed as a complementiser, illustrated by Bao

Singlish grammar is the set of structural rules Singlish follows, including the structure of words, phrases, clauses, and sentences. It is influenced by the grammar of Malay and the Chinese languages.

Some features of Singlish grammar include topic-prominence, where sentences begin with a known referent of the conversation, omission of the word be, reduplication of words, and discourse particles such as ah, lah, and what. Discourse particles are a distinguishing feature of Singlish, which impart pragmatic but not semantic information. According to Smakman and Wagenaar, lah and ah are used the most. The earliest particles, ah, lah, and what, were acquired from Hokkien and Bazaar Malay, while a later set of particles, lor, hor, leh, meh and mah, were acquired mostly from Cantonese.

== Vocabulary ==
Much of Singlish vocabulary is derived from British English, in addition to loanwords from Malay, Hokkien, Mandarin, Cantonese and Tamil. Malay and Hokkien contributed the most loanwords to Singlish. Of the Chinese varieties, Mandarin is a newer influence on Singlish compared to Hokkien and Cantonese, which have had a longer history and greater influence. The composition is described as a "fair representation" of languages spoken in Singapore, except the Indian languages, by Tan Ying-Ying. It also shares some words with American English such as Scotch tape, compared to British English Sellotape.

Examples of loanwords in Singlish from various languages
Language	Etymon	Singlish	Definition in Singlish	Ref.
Malay	makan	makan	to eat	
Hokkien	惊输 (kiaⁿ-su)	kiasu	fear or dislike of losing to others	
Mandarin	加油 (jiā yóu)	jiayou	"all the best!", "work hard!"	
Cantonese	长气 (coeng4 hei3)	cheong hei	long-winded	
Tamil	குண்டு (kuṇṭu)	goondu	a fool; a simpleton	

According to a 2024 study surveying Singaporeans between 16 to 59 years old by Preply, a language-learning company, the most popular terms in Singlish were alamak, an expression of alarm, makan, meaning to eat, and the discourse particles, lah, lor, leh, and meh.

During borrowing, words of English origin sometime take on the alternative senses of their Chinese counterparts, resulting in an extension in meanings. For example, send can be used to mean 'accompany someone', as in "Let me send you to the airport", possibly under the influence of Hokkien 送 (sàng) or Cantonese 送 (sung3).

The lexis of Singlish is very similar to Manglish, although there are some differences in the frequency of usage. Manglish receives more influence from Malay, such as the greater use of the suffix -kan to gain clarification. On the other hand, Singlish receives more influence from Chinese languages, such as the greater use of Cantonese lor to express obviousness and resignation. This is due to the geographically close locations of Singapore and Malaysia, shared culture, and shared history.

In the 20th century, older expressions such as angkat and samseng, which come from Bazaar Malay and Hokkien respectively, saw less use, while words like slay and cooked became more prevalent, creating a generational difference between younger and older people in understanding each other's Singlish. The features from the contact languages that initially formed Singlish decreased, but the distinctiveness of Singlish increased. This was due to a shift from Bazaar Malay and Hokkien as more widely-spoken languages to English, with Hokkien diminishing due to the Speak Mandarin Campaign and Bazaar Malay losing its role as a lingua franca. According to Tan Ying Ying, a linguist from Nanyang Technological University, it reflected a change adapting to a different social context.

=== Ah Beng ===
Tommy Wong playing the character of an Ah Beng

Ah Beng is a Singlish term from a common Hokkien male name 明 (bêng), describing a social category of "uncouth Chinese [men]". Its synonym is Ah Seng, and its female counterpart is Ah Lian and Ah Hui. According to Wong Jock Onn, Ah Beng is a more culturally relevant concept compared to Ah Lians; Ah Lians are seen merely as friends of Ah Bengs. It typically only applies to Chinese Singaporeans due to its etymology, but Malay Beng may be used for Malay Singaporeans.

According to Chua Beng Huat, the term Ah Beng grew in popularity from the 1980s, during an increase of a consumption-driven culture, representing what the working class youth look like to the English-speaking middle class.

Ah Bengs are associated with gangsters; they have a flashy and poor fashion sense with non-matching clothes, little education, and uses the low-status Hokkien language instead of Standard English.

It was added to the Oxford English Dictionary in September 2016.

=== Ang moh ===
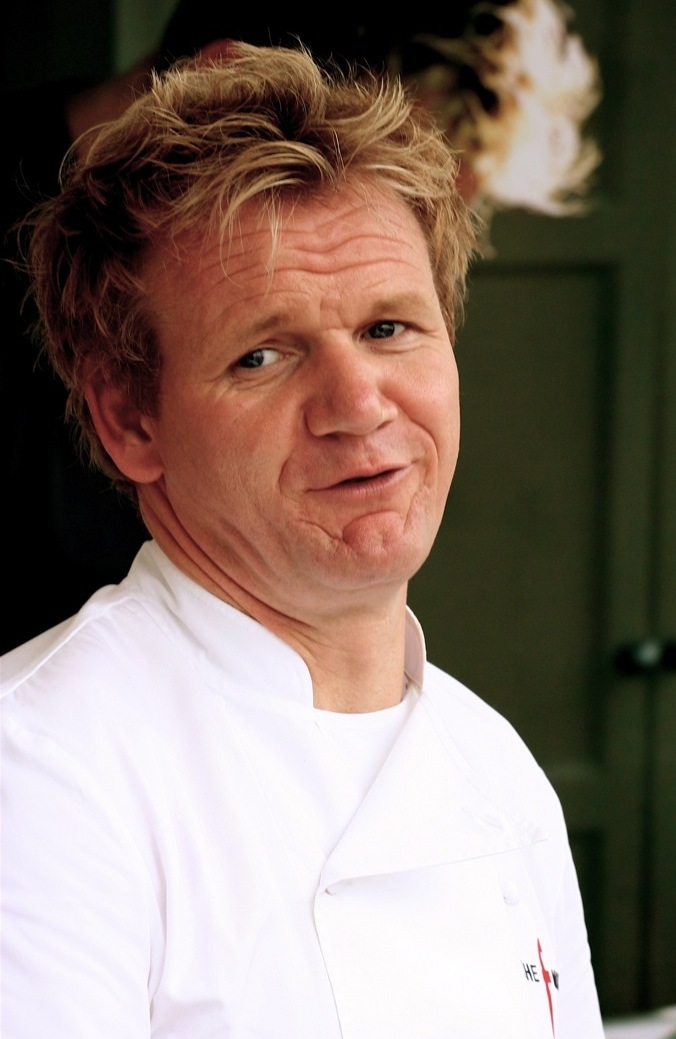
Gordon Ramsay, an ang moh, as described by BBC

Ang moh, also spelled ang mo, a Singlish term from Hokkien 红毛 / 紅毛 (âng-mo͘), literally 'red hair', pronounced /aŋ mɔ/, means 'a white person' as a noun, and having the attributes of a white person as an adjective.

The word can be traced to a written reference from the 1600s on a map in the Chinese script, labelling the Maluku islands in Indonesia, likely referring to the Dutch by the Hokkien, due to the colour of their hair, according to Mok Ly Yng, a map consultant.

Whether the term is racist and derogatory varies by individual perception; David Chan wrote to The Straits Times that its usage was rude, comparing it to the Western usage of "chink" to describe Chinese people, while Bruce Lockhart wrote to The Straits Times that its usage was acceptable, attributing its perceived rudeness to the Western cultural fear of referring to people by their race even in non-derogatory terms.

It was added to the Oxford English Dictionary in March 2016.

=== BTO ===
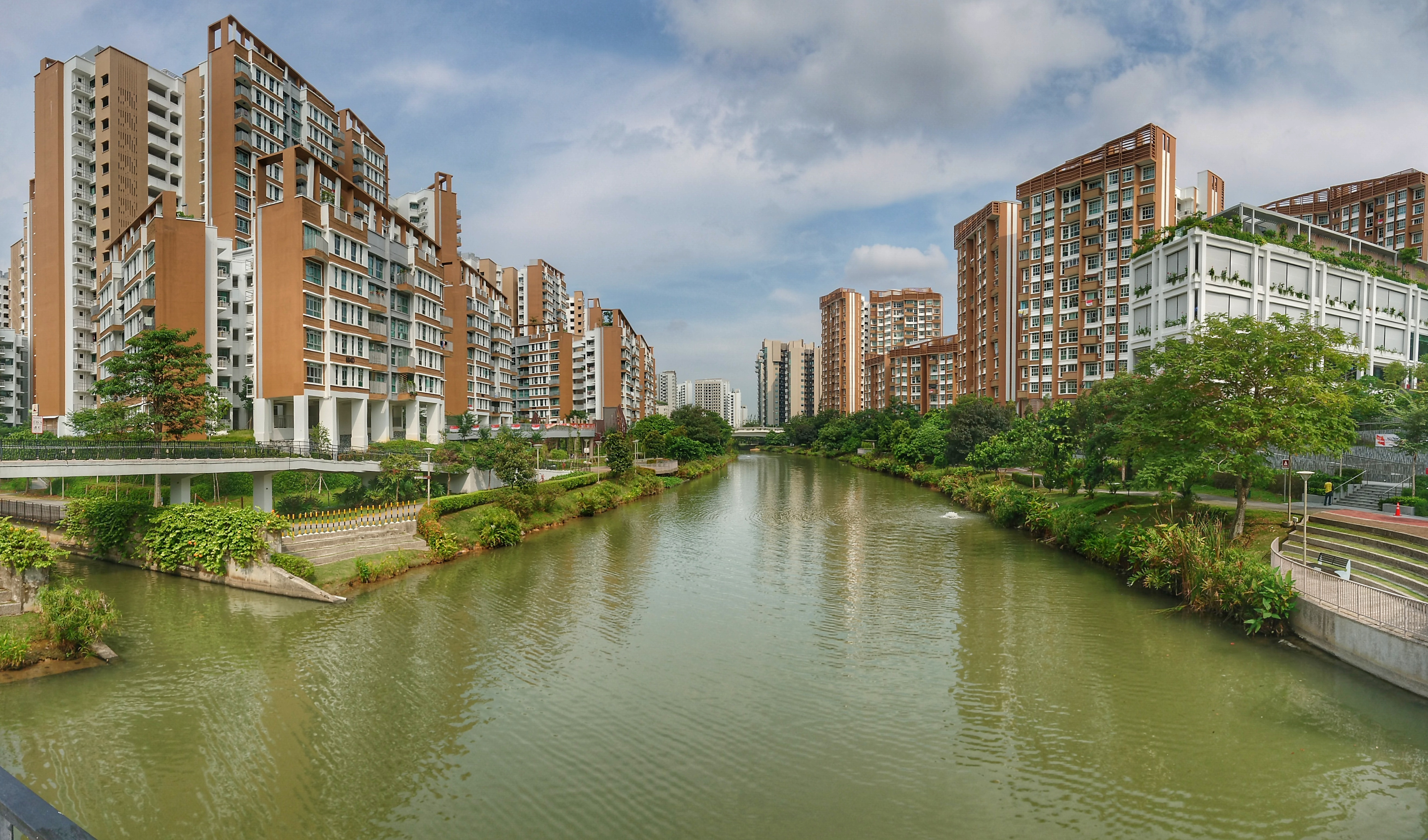
BTO residences in the North-East Region of Punggol

BTO, a Singlish term from the initialism of the Build-To-Order scheme, refers to a flat managed by the Housing and Development Board under the said scheme, or to apply for such a flat, under the pretext of a relationship goal. The scheme was launched as a pilot programme in 2001, replacing the older Registration for Flats System (RFS) by 2003. It addressed the shortcomings of the RFS, giving applicants a greater stake in location and completion time, and is a demand and queue-based system.

According to Oxford English Dictionary, the significance of the event is similar to that of an engagement. According to Nicole Chan of Channel NewsAsia, asking about the BTO application is more common than asking about marriage by friends of young couples; housing is a bigger commitment than marriage due to mortgage and Central Provident Fund contributions. According to Kimberly Lim of Channel NewsAsia, the typical couple applies for a BTO flat, waits around three to four years, gets married, and moves in. According to Sumit Agarwal, Ang Swee Hoon, and Sing Tien Foo, professors of the National University of Singapore, it encouraged early marriages, but also increased the likelihood of divorce, as couples may rush their marriage decisions.

It was added to the Oxford English Dictionary in March 2026.

=== Kiasu ===
A pack of tissues used to chope ('reserve') seats, a behaviour associated with being kiasu.

Kiasu, a Singlish term from Hokkien 惊输 / 驚輸 (kiaⁿ-su), pronounced /kjasu/, means 'afraid of losing out'. It first appeared formally in a parliamentary document in 1990, after having been restricted in usage to National Service with negative connotations, but became more nuanced after. A Southern Chinese cultural value, it refers to mindsets such as not wanting to forgo a free benefit and not wanting to fall behind peers in academics, and may be compared to the fear of missing out.

According to Gwee Li Sui, being kiasu is controversial; it is looked down upon but yet happily practised individually. Mr Kiasu, a character which debuted in 1990 created by the artist Johnny Lau, received cultural iconicity according to Sarah Keating of the BBC; it received a TV adaptation and a McDonald's burger based on it.

According to a 2015 study by the Institute of Policy Studies, kiasu was the top descriptor of Singapore's society. It was added to the Oxford English Dictionary in March 2007, and was featured as its word of the day on 11 February 2015.

== Sample texts ==
The following transcribed audio was published by the Infocomm Media Development Authority in the National Speech Corpus in 2018. It contains a speech by a female Singaporean Malay in her 20s, with light restylisation and correction for errors.

Audio recording of the transcript

I think so lah, if they're faster then okay lah, should be okay lah. At first, I was not confident, then I was like so lost sia. Like, I don't know what is this about, then everything, then I managed to get through, then I just go with the flow, then suddenly from being awkward, then I can just... because they said just talk in Singlish manner right, so I just talk in Singlish manner lah. So you have lah, whatever, and then this is my real accent of English lor.

The following text was published by Miranda Tay of The Straits Times in 1980, with light restylisation.

Come on lah, what's wrong with Singlish? Why you worry about Singlish? There really is no need to. The trouble with us Singaporeans is that we can be very one kind. We just don't have a sense of humour. When the occasion demands that something be taken lightly, instead of turning out trumps like we ought to, we appear very maloo or people think us bodoh.

== See also ==
- List of Singapore abbreviations
- Sound correspondences between English accents
- Chinese Pidgin English, another contact language historically spoken in Singapore
