= Cultural depictions of Lee Kuan Yew =

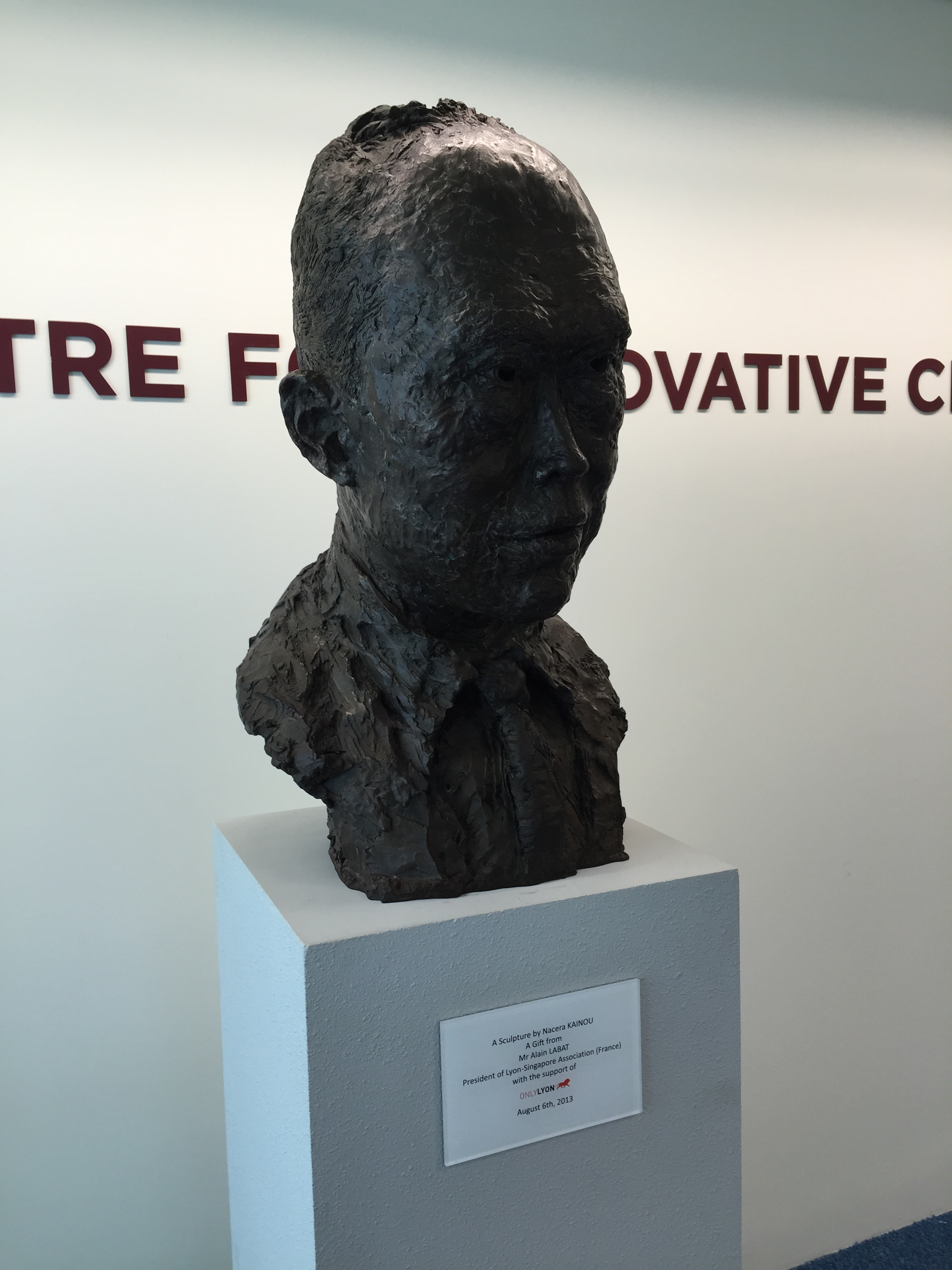
A bust of Lee Kuan Yew on display at the Singapore University of Technology and Design, presented to Lee as a gift in 2013.

Lee Kuan Yew, the first (and longest serving) prime minister of Singapore, has been the subject of many cultural depictions both before and after his death in 2015.

== Sculptures ==
In the early 1980s, Lee agreed to have a sculpture and oil painting of him done, on the condition that they not be exhibited in his lifetime. The works, respectively by British sculptor Sydney Harpley and American portrait painter Marion Pike, were commissioned by a group of Singaporeans, including first Chief Minister David Marshall. They are now part of the National Heritage Board's national collection, but only the bronze bust has gone on public display, briefly at the Istana and Parliament House. An artist's proof of the sculpture was exhibited in 2025.

In August 2013, a bronze bust of Lee, cast by contemporary French artist-sculptor Nacera Kainou, was unveiled at the Singapore University of Technology and Design as an early birthday present to Lee from the Lyon-Singapore Association and the municipality of Lyon.

In 2014, the Madame Tussauds Singapore museum unveiled a wax figure of Lee and his late wife, Madam Kwa Geok Choo seated and smiling together against a backdrop of red flowers formed in the shape of two hearts. The statues were created based on a photograph that was taken by Madam Kwa's niece, Ms Kwa Kim Li, of the pair on Valentine's Day in 2008 at Sentosa.

In October 2015, sculptor Lim Leong Seng exhibited a 75 cm bronze sculpture he made of Lee, entitled Weathering Storms As One. A month later, in November 2015, the Singaporean Honorary Consulate General in Barcelona unveiled a bust of Lee at Cap Roig Gardens in Costa Brava,

In 2023, the centenary of Lee's birth, American artist Daniel Arsham was commissioned to create two sculptures of Lee, Eroded Bronze LKY Bust 1:1 and LKY Full Body 1:2, using bronze, stainless steel, and patina. They were exhibited, along with AI-generated videos and portraits of Lee, at the immersive exhibition Now Is Not The Time in September.

In July 2025, Cuturi Gallery showcased Singaporean artist Yom Bo Sung's small-scale sculpture of Lee, Elegy, as part of the exhibition Sixty Summers Here.

== Paintings, portraits and art installations ==
In 1979, oil painter Chua Mia Tee depicted Lee's return from London after the Merdeka Talks.

In 1991, Chua Mia Tee presented an oil painting of Lee to the Minister himself, depicting him against a backdrop of Singapore's transformation. The untitled painting was commissioned by fifth president Ong Teng Cheong. In 1992, artist Lai Kui Fang presented historical oil paintings of Lee's 1959 swearing-in ceremony as prime minister, which are now part of the National Museum of Singapore's collection. Also in 1992, watercolourist Ong Kim Seng painted Lee visiting the aftermath of the Bukit Ho Swee fire, based on a 1961 photograph. The painting was reproduced in The Straits Times and sold to an unknown collector. In 2025, Ong recreated the painting, on a larger canvas, for an exhibition.

In 2008, artist Ben Puah unveiled Hero, a solo exhibition of Lee portraits at Forth Gallery. In 2009, artist Richard Lim Han presented Singapore Guidance Angel, a solo exhibition of Lee portraits at Forth Gallery. Comics artist and painter Sonny Liew depicted Lee as part of the series Eric Khoo is a Hotel Magnate at Mulan Gallery. In addition, Cultural Medallion recipient Tan Swie Hian also began a painting of Lee and his late wife titled A Couple. The painting, which took Tan five years to complete, was partially damaged by a fire in 2013. It depicts Lee and Kwa in their youth, is based on a 1946 black-and-white photograph of the couple in Cambridge University and incorporates in its background Tan's poem in memory of Kwa. A Couple was purchased by art collector Wu Hsioh Kwang.

In 2010, Valentine Willie Fine Art gallery asked 19 local artists to imagine a future without Lee. The resulting exhibition, Beyond LKY, included artist a triptych of Lee as a father figure looming over a tiny kneeling figure with the words, "Papa can you hear me"; an installation of a broken piano with a tape recorder playing a crackling version of Singapore's National Anthem; white ceramic chains hanging on a wall; and an installation of hammers smashed together. That year, Korean artist Kim Dong Yoo depicted Lee in Lee Kuan Yew & Queen Elizabeth II (2010), an oil-on-canvas portrait of Lee using small images of Queen Elizabeth II's head, a reference to Singapore being a former British colony and current member of the Commonwealth.

In 2011, the iris image of Lee's eye was captured and artistically rendered to resemble a sand art gallery piece. His eye image with his autograph was auctioned off to raise funds for the Singapore Eye Research Institute. In 2012, urban artist Sam Lo depicted Lee in their controversial Limpeh series, featuring his image in Shepard Fairey-inspired stickers, mirrors and collages.

Artist Sukeshi Sondhi staged An Icon & A Legend, a solo exhibition in 2013 featuring 20 pop art style paintings of Lee. Speed painter Brad Blaze was commissioned to craft a portrait of Lee, Trailblazer: Singapore, to raise funds for Reach Community Services Society.

In 2014, Bruneian painter Huifong Ng landed an exhibition after painting a portrait of Lee. Chinese artist Ren Zhenyu also created expressionist portraits of Lee in electric hues as part of his Pop and Politics series. Vietnamese artist Mai Huy Dung has crafted a series of oil painting portraits of Lee. Ukrainian artist Oleg Lazarenko also depicted Lee as part of his painting Lion of Singapore.

In February 2015, weeks before Lee's death, Helmi Yusof of The Business Times reported on how "[i]n the last few years, artworks featuring Lee Kuan Yew have turned into a flourishing cottage industry". Artworks included Jeffrey Koh's seven LKY Pez candy-dispenser sculptures, paintings of Lee in the manner of Van Gogh, and Korean sculptor Park Seung Mo's three-dimensional image of Lee made using stainless steel wires. In March, Singaporean artist Fan Shaohua and Lebanese-British artist Laudi Abilama also exhibited their portraits of Lee. In the same month, the National Parks Board named a Singapore Botanic Gardens orchid hybrid called the "Aranda Lee Kuan Yew" in honour of Lee's efforts work in conservation and environmentalism. Also in March, a portrait of Lee by Ong Yi Teck, comprising Lee's name written about 18,000 times, went viral on social media. The portrait was made in tribute to Lee, who was then critically ill.

Days after Lee died in 2015, the Asian edition of Time featured the late Lee Kuan Yew on its cover. In April 2015, an exhibition of 300 oil paintings on Lee and Singapore opened at Suntec City. Presented by art collector Vincent Chua, The Singapore Story featured 80 portraits of Lee and a life-size statue of Lee shaking hands with Deng Xiaoping when the Chinese statesman visited Singapore in 1978. In November 2015, pop artist Andre Tan showed his series of portraits of Lee, 1965 and Father of the Nation (国父) at the Affordable Art Fair Singapore.

In 2016, to mark the first death anniversary of Lee, Lee's brother Lee Suan Yew and nephew Shaun Lee completed the art installation by young Singaporeans of Singapore flag erasers put together to form Lee's face, titled Our Father, Our Country, Our Flag. Self-taught artist Teng Jee Hum launched Godsmacked, a book of his 92 paintings of Lee, including as Superman, while graphic designer Sharlene Leong exhibited her portraits of Lee, accompanied by his quotes, in the show Remembering LKY.

In 2017, INSTINC gallery hosted The Tao of Lee Kuan Yew, an exhibition commemorating Lee's birthday with portraits of Lee by 14 artists. In 2023, paintings of Lee were exhibited at Tanjong Pagar Community Club in the show LKY100.

In 2024, Singaporean artist David Chan showed his painting Lee And Raffles – 5 Stars Rising at Art Seasons Gallery's booth at the Art SG fair, where it sold to a collector. In the same year, architectural draftsman Tamilarasan Shanmuganandam's portrait of Lee—formed by the word “Singapore” repeated thousands of times—was included in the Singapore Book of Records as the country's “largest portrait made of handwritten letters”.

In 2025, Lee's ten-year death anniversary and "SG60" (Singapore's 60th year of independence), INSTINC gallery's exhibition 10 Years: Remembering LKY showcased artworks reflecting on Lee's legacy, including portraits of Lee by Boo Sze Yang, Chang Hui Fang, and Laudi Abilama; Justin Lee's series LKY Quotes; and Yeo Shih Yun's screenprint of Lee planting a tree in 1973. The exhibition was a follow-up to Remembering LKY in 2015. In July, the group exhibition Artist’s Proof: Singapore At 60 showed, alongside an artist's proof of Harpley's bust of Lee, cartoonist Sonny Liew's figurine of Lee, as part of commissioned project "P.A.P. x P.A."; Foo Kwee Horng's painting portrait of Lee, Majulah (2016); a portrait of Lee by Rajesh P Kargutkar; and Jon Chan's oil paintings of the offices of Lee and former political detainee Chia Thye Poh.

== Books ==
Indian-Swiss novelist Meira Chand's A Different Sky, published by UK's Harvill Secker in 2010, features Lee in his early years as a lawyer and co-founder of the People's Action Party. In 2013, poet Cyril Wong published The Dictator's Eyebrow, a poetry collection revolving around a Lee-like figure and his eyebrow's thirst for recognition and power. In the same year, a group of Tamil poets from three countries, including Singapore Literature Prize winner Ramanathan Vairavan, produced Lee Kuan Yew 90, a collection of 90 new poems celebrating Lee's legacy.

In October 2014, cartoonist Morgan Chua released LKY: Political Cartoons, an anthology of cartoons about Lee published by Epigram Books, featuring a 1971 Singapore Herald cartoon of Lee on a tank threatening to crush a baby representing press freedoms. In 2014 and 2015, illustrator Patrick Yee launched a picture book series about Lee, called Harry Grows Up, with the second book (The Early Years of Lee Kuan Yew) being featured at an exhibition at the National Library, Singapore. Also in 2015, Sonny Liew released his graphic novel The Art of Charlie Chan Hock Chye, in which Lee is a central character.

Japanese writer Yoshio Nabeta published a manga-style graphic novel on Lee's life, titled The LKY Story, followed by two children's versions in 2017.

== Film and theatre ==
In July 2015, veteran actor Lim Kay Tong portrayed Lee in the historical film 1965, including a re-enactment of the iconic press conference when Lee announced that Singapore would be separated from Malaysia That same month, actor Adrian Pang played Lee in The LKY Musical opposite Sharon Au's Kwa Geok Choo. The musical was restaged in 2022, with Pang reprising his role.

From July to August 2025, the Mandarin musical Moonlit City portrayed Lee's love life with his wife Kwa Geok Choo, with Timothy Wan playing Lee. The musical was restaged in English in 2026, with Alvin Julian Tan taking over as Lee. In August, movie director Jack Neo uploaded a music video for his song, "We Are Singapore", including AI-generated images of the late Lee.

== Other cultural depictions ==
In 2009, freelance designer, Christopher "Treewizard" Pereira, began making caricature figurines of Lee which range from 12 cm to 30 cm.

After Lee's death in 2015, a 16-year-old blogger named Amos Yee released a video, Lee Kuan Yew is Finally Dead!, which criticised Lee and negatively compared him to Jesus Christ. Yee also posted on his blog a stick-figure cartoon depicting Lee having sex with Margaret Thatcher, a personal and political ally of Lee's. For his actions, Yee was charged with insulting religious feelings and obscenity, and sentenced to four weeks imprisonment despite his youth.
