= Sylvia Toh =

Singaporean newspaper columnist

Sylvia Toh Paik Choo
- Born: 1946 or 1947 (age 79–80); Penang, British Malaya
- Occupations: Newspaper columnist, humour writer

Chinese name
- Chinese: 杜碧珠
- Hanyu Pinyin: Dù Bìzhū
- Hokkien POJ: Tō͘ Phek-chu

Sylvia Toh Paik Choo (杜碧珠; born 1946) is a Singaporean newspaper columnist and humour writer.

== Early life and education ==
Toh was born in Penang to a Hokkien-speaking family. Her family moved to Singapore shortly after her birth. She studied at St Margaret’s Girls School but left the school at 14 after failing school examinations. She then studied at a private school and then Stamford College for her O and A levels respectively.

== Career ==
She is the author of Eh Goondu! (1982) and Lagi Goondu! (1986), the first two books on Singlish. She was the first to put a spelling and punctuation to Singlish. Written with good humour, the books can be considered as social history. Toh has been compared to Art Buchwald and Mark Twain.

She previously wrote for The New Paper before moving to fashion website Superadrianme.

In 2023, Toh was inducted into the Singapore Media Industry Hall of Fame.

In 2024, Toh was inducted into the Singapore Women's Hall of Fame.

== Bibliography ==
- Eh Goondu! (1982, Eastern Universities Press) ISBN 9971711680
- The Pick of Paik Choo (1982, Times Books International) ISBN 997165122X
- Friendship, Courtship, Hatred, Love (1983, Times Books International) ISBN 9971651335
- Lagi Goondu! (1986, Times Books International) ISBN 9971652242
- The Original Singapore Sling Book (1986, Landmark Books) ISBN 9813002026
- On the Buses (1987, Landmark Books) ISBN 9813002077
- The Hosomes! (1994, Singapore Courtesy Council)
- Paik-Choo (2011). The complete eh, goondu!. Singapore : Tarrytown, N.Y., USA: Marshall Cavendish Editions; Marshall Cavendish Corp. ISBN 978-981-4328-45-6.
