= Singlish grammar =

Structural rules governing Singlish

Publication by Mary Lee and Toh Li Lin from The New Paper on 26 September 1999, about the existence of grammar in Singlish.

Singlish grammar is the set of structural rules followed by Colloquial Singaporean English (Singlish), including the structure of words, phrases, clauses, and sentences. The grammar of Singlish is influenced by Malay and the Chinese languages.

Some features of Singlish grammar include topic-prominence, where sentences begin with a known referent of the conversation, omission of the word be, reduplication of words, and discourse particles such as lah, leh and ah. Discourse particles are a distinguishing feature of Singlish, which impart pragmatic but not semantic information. According to Smakman and Wagenaar, lah and ah are used the most. The earliest particles, lah, ah, and what, were acquired from Hokkien and Bazaar Malay, while a later set of particles, lor, hor, leh, meh and mah, were acquired mostly from Cantonese.

== Background ==
According to Gupta, Singlish likely arose from varieties of standard English, such as Eurasian, Indian, British and American English, varieties of Chinese, such as Hokkien, Teochew and Cantonese, and a variety of Malay, such as Bazaar or Baba Malay, and possibly Kristang, the Portuguese creole. The grammar of Singlish is influenced by Malay and the Chinese languages. For example, the lack of verbal inflections, the lack of articles and topic-prominence are grammatical features that Singlish, Malay and the Chinese languages share. Singlish is highly mutually intelligible with Manglish.

In 1992, Catherine Lim, an author, said that Singlish should be differentiated from English with bad grammar and pronunciation as a result of imperfect learning. In 2000, VJ Times published Singlish to English: Basic Grammar Guide, a Singlish textbook. By 2017, Singlish is considered by linguists to be an independent language with its own systematic grammar, being studied by at least seven universities internationally.

Initially, Singlish was deemed as grammatically incorrect by the Singapore Broadcasting Corporation (SBC). In 2000, the Speak Good English Movement was launched, an annual campaign to encourage standard English and discourage Singlish, characterising it as "bad English". From the 2010s, it received greater global interest and became more celebrated and accepted in Singapore. By 2016, the SGEM had adjusted their stance to encourage those who only speak Singlish to also speak standard English and sought to differentiate Singlish and standard English.

== Topic prominence ==
Singlish is topic-prominent, like Chinese and Malay. It is described as a "basic structure" by Ludwig Tan, a linguist at the University of Cambridge. Sentences may begin with a discourse topic, followed by a comment with new information. All major phrase categories may serve as the topic, such as noun phrases, verb phrases, preposition phrases, and tense phrases (sentences).

The topic can be omitted when the subject is understood from the context. Multiple topics may precede the comment, and multiple comments may follow a topic. Utterances without a topic are a diagnostic feature of Singlish. Verb groups with null subjects are also referred to as pro-drop.

Topic type	Example	Gloss
Noun phrase	Certain medicine we don't stock ∅ in our dispensary.	We don't stock certain medicines in our dispensary.
Verb phrase	Is very interesting I find geography ∅.	I find geography very interesting.
Preposition phrase	Inside the schoolbag they've got food ∅.	They've got food inside the schoolbag.
Tense phrase	You can investigate some of the case ∅ actually will be good.	It actually will be good if you can investigate some of the cases.

Topics can be categorised into three different kinds: "theme-proper" (TP), "diatheme" (DT) and "middle-theme" (MT).

"Theme-proper" topics carry information of a topic from an earlier clause. Omission of topics of this kind make up 90.76% of all omitted topics in Leong Ping's research. This is because they contribute the least to the development of the conversation. The omission of these topics is also known as a topic chain, which is also present in Chinese and Malay.

- What did you_{TP} do in your English classes_{TP}?
- ∅_{TP} Write compositions. – 'In my English classes, I wrote compositions.'

"Diatheme" topics carry information of a non-topic from an earlier clause. These are omitted infrequently as they are more important to communication.

- I mean um, it's not every day that I_{TP} can play with little children.
- Uh huh, but ∅_{DT} very tiring right? – 'Uh huh, but playing with little children is very tiring, right?'

"Middle-theme" topics carry information that may be recoverable from the context, but otherwise do not have relation to the established conversation. These are omissible only if there is a shared understanding, or if the situational context permits it, such as if the referents are present in the conversation.

- ∅_{MT} Got a meeting. ∅_{TP} Can't come. – 'He has a meeting. He cannot come.' (If he is a shared understanding)

=== Bare conditionals ===
Bare conditionals are conditional sentences, constructed in a way that is indistinguishable from a topic-prominent sentence. According to Bao Zhiming, it is likely influenced by Chinese rather than English.

If-words, such as if, unless, and as long as, which create conditional clauses, may be omitted in Singlish, and is similar to Chinese grammar. Contextual clues are required to determine if the condition and consequent are two independent events, temporally related, or causally related. All major phrase categories can serve as a conditional, just like a topic. Unlike in English, where bare conditionals such as say that again and you're fired are used for imperatives conveying a threat with negative connotations, Singlish carries no such nuance or requirements.

- You want, you better book early. – 'If you want it, you'd better book early.'

== Nouns ==
=== Countability ===
Nouns are optionally marked for plurality. Articles are also optional.

- He can play piano. – 'He can play the piano.'
- I like to read storybook. – 'I like to read storybooks.'
- Your computer got virus or not? – 'Does your computer have a virus?'
- This one ten cent only. – 'This one only costs ten cents.'

Many uncountable nouns, such as furniture and clothing, can be made countable.

- By feeling the cardboards, it can fold up to 600 cartons a day. – 'By feeling the cardboard, it can fold up to 600 cartons a day.'
- Why a salesman is now a client relations personnel. – 'Why a salesman is now a client relations person.'

Nouns after premodifiers that represent a quantitatively definite set, such as all, are more likely to be marked for plurality.

Alsagoff and Ho wrote that nouns are always pluralised when accompanied by a quantifier, such as many or four. Wee and Ansaldo instead wrote that it might be optional, citing sentences from the Grammar of Spoken Singapore English Corpus.

Inclusion of an unnecessary quantifier with countable nouns can also be found, such as on invoices.

- Twenty pieces of chairs. – 'Twenty chairs.'
- About 270 units of "lifestyle cars" were sold. – 'About 270 "lifestyle cars" were sold.'

=== Adjectives as non-generic nouns ===
Premodifiers may also be used as a noun to represent specific groups, unlike English, where the adjective can only refer to a generic group, such as in "The poor need more help".

- Okay, so you no need to take the basic. You just attend the class. – ''Okay, so you do not need to take the basic test. You just have to attend the class."

=== Pronouns ===
One can function as a pronoun; it substitutes a noun and can be made explicit through a substitution. It may also be constructed by preceding it with a possessive pronoun, which provides emphasis.

- Buy the packet type. Don't buy the box box one. – 'Buy the packet type. Don't buy the boxy type.'
- That book is his one. – 'That book is his.'
- Your one is nicer. – 'Yours is nicer.'

Alsagoff and Ho wrote that one might also be analysed as a relative pronoun occurring at the end of the relative clause instead of between the head and dependent clause. Bao says that it is plausible, but is mostly dependent on a native speaker's intuition. Wee and Ansaldo says that because one is mostly found sentence-finally, it is unlikely that the explanation can account for its sentence-final appearance, because relative clauses rarely shift to the end of the sentence.

- The man sell ice cream one gone home already. – 'The man who sells ice cream has gone home already.'

=== Nominalisation ===
One functions as a nominalizer which appears at the final direct object position of a clause, turning it into a noun phrase.

- Ah Chew buy expensive one. – 'Ah Chew bought an expensive one.'

== Omission involving verbs ==
=== Object ===
The object a verb takes can also be omitted, similar to Chinese grammar.

- My son wants ∅ to carry ∅ all the time. – 'My son wants his dad to carry him all the time.'

=== Inflections ===
Inflecting the verb for tense and subject-verb agreement is optional, but not random. For example, if the verb is inflected for the past tense, it must semantically agree with adverbials like yesterday.

=== After also ===
Verb phrases may be replaced with also in sentences that have established context.

- John run already. I also ∅. – 'John has run. So have I.'
- Ali not here. Fatimah also ∅. – 'Ali is not here. Fatimah is not here either.'

=== Copula be ===
The copula verb be tends to be omitted,but omission varies with education level; the less-educated omit be more often where it would be expected. It is a diagnostic feature of Singlish. The omission can be explained with topic prominence.

Omission must agree with tense. Omission of the copula is only used to express the present tense, in the absence of any words denoting time. Omission of the copula is only permitted to express the past tense in the presence of words like was and just now, and the future tense in the presence of words like tomorrow.

It is omitted the most before an adjective or adjective phrase, and omitted the least before a preposition phrase expressing a location. These findings are consistent across education levels ranging from primary to tertiary education, and may be influenced by Chinese and Malay grammar.

- This coffee house ∅ very cheap. – 'This coffee house is very cheap.'
- My brother ∅ in Australia. – 'My brother is in Australia.'

It can also be omitted in equative and attributive expressions.

- Colour ∅ not very good. – 'The colour is not very good.'

It cannot be omitted when the subject, at the clause-final position, is too short, such as pronouns.

- He ∅ my neighbour. – 'He is my neighbour.'
- *My neighbour ∅ him.

It cannot be omitted when clauses use a dummy subject, such as existential clauses and it-cleft constructions.

- *There ∅ options available.
- *It ∅ the pilot who saw it.

It cannot be omitted when it appears in a verb phrase with other auxiliary verbs, which is different from the acceptable omission in a construction where context is established in English.

- *Today must ∅ Saturday.
- *You are ∅ difficult.
- You should be quite assured, and Pat should ∅ too. – 'You should be quite assured, and Pat should be too.'

=== Auxiliary verbs ===
The auxiliary verb be which occurs before a progressive verb in a verb phrase can be omitted. This includes interrogatives, making subject-auxiliary inversion unobservable.

- They ∅ trying to kill the benefactor. – 'They are trying to kill the benefactor.'
- How ∅ you going to dance? – 'How are you going to dance?'

The auxiliary passive be which is followed by a past participle verb can also be omitted, including in the idiomatic phrase be supposed to.

- Milk ∅ also given by the mother. – 'Milk was also given by the mother.'
- You ∅ supposed to make a U-turn. – 'You were supposed to make a U-turn.'

Only a contiguous group of auxiliaries at the left-most position can be omitted in a verb phrase, which is composed of multiple verbs, in the order, but possibly not all of: modal, have, be supporting a progressive, be supporting a passive and the main verb. An example of this order is could have been being chased. The deletion of modal auxiliaries like can or may will lead to a different meaning of the sentence would be unacceptable for semantic and not grammatical reasons.

In affirmative sentences, if the subject is already omitted, the following be or have must be omitted. For example, in response to Is she singing this song?:

- *∅ Is singing this song.
- ∅ ∅ singing this song. – 'She is singing this song.'

In negative sentences, if the subject is already omitted, a following be must be omitted, but a following have may or may not be omitted. However, the acceptability of have not and has not is lower than their contracted counterparts, hasn't and haven't. For example, in response to Is she singing this song?:

- *∅ Is not singing this song.
- ∅ ∅ Not singing this song. – 'She is not singing this song.'

For another example, in response to Have you finished the project?:

- ∅ Haven't finished yet. – 'I have not finished it yet.'
- ∅ Have not finished yet. – 'I have not finished it yet.'
- ∅ ∅ Not finished yet. – 'I have not finished it yet.'

=== Do-support ===
Do-support is optional in interrogatives; do can be omitted in questions that normally contain them.

- ∅ You still want them? – 'Do you still want them?'
- What ∅ you want me to say? – 'What do you want me to say?'

Do-support is also optional in negative statements, when the negative word occurs before the verb.

- We ∅ not visit his place. – 'We do not visit his place.'

== Tense–aspect–mood ==
=== Auxiliary have ===
A verb phrase that contains have may only omit it if either the verb is in a past participle form, or if already is included with the verb in an infinitive form.

- *She beat the eggs.
- She ∅ beaten the eggs. – 'She has beaten the eggs.'
- She ∅ beat the eggs already. – 'She has beaten the eggs.'

=== Past tense ===
Past tense marking is optional in Singlish. Marking of the past tense occurs most often in irregular verbs, followed by verbs where the past tense suffix is pronounced /ɪd/, and least often in verbs that end in a /t/ or /d/. However, attributing the omission to a phonological or syntactic process is unclear. Only verbs that end in a /t/ or /d/ can be explained with consonant cluster simplification.

The past tense is most likely to be marked for punctual verbs that happen momentarily, such as jump or paint a picture. The past tense is least likely to be marked for non-punctual verbs, expressing iterative and durative actions, such as jump for five minutes or paints like Rivera.

Be is frequently marked for the past tense, and is used to set a scene of the discourse happening in the past. Once the time frame of the discourse is established with the past tense, subsequent verbs may not be marked for the past tense.

Habitual adverbs like sometimes and when also cause verbs to be unmarked for the past tense. This may be influenced by Chinese, as the Chinese perfective aspect marker 了 (le, Pe̍h-ōe-jī: liáu) is similarly unable to co-occur with a habitual verb.

Stative verbs such as be that remain true are more likely to be expressed with the present tense, but not as likely as punctual verbs.

- We went there to shop, and then we see a lot of things.

=== Habitual aspect ===
Will, influenced by Hokkien 欲 (beh) and Malay akan, expresses the habitual aspect. The regular event may be in the present or in the past. Would may also be used in place of will, but may additionally indicate some tentativeness and the irrealis mood.

- Last time, she will babysit for other people. – 'Last time, she babysat for other people.'
- I usually would study in school until the evenings. – 'I usually studied in school until the evening.'

=== Perfective aspect ===
==== Already ====
Already, from Chinese 了 (le, Pe̍h-ōe-jī: liáu), expresses the perfective, inchoative aspect ('start of a new state'), and inceptive aspect ('about to start'), unlike English already, which cannot be used inchoatively. It is used more often than have or had to express the perfective aspect. Liao, from Hokkien 了 (le, Pe̍h-ōe-jī: liáu), is also compared to already, such as in its usage to express the perfective aspect, and are equivalent according to Mie Hiramoto. Already can be used sentence-finally, or sentence-medially, but only between the subject and the verb, depending on the type of verb used; volitional verbs cannot be used sentence-medially.

Its use between the perfective, inchoative, and inceptive aspect is ambiguous, and is influenced by speech context, and the specific words used. When already is used with verbs expressing motion, such as go, or "achievement" verbs which finish instantaneously, such as reach, it can only express the perfective aspect. Meanwhile, with verbs expressing volition, such as want, it can only express the inchoative aspect, and can only be used sentence-finally.

For example, the sentence Miss Lin eat cake already may be glossed as the following in a table; it is ambiguous depending on the context.

Aspect	Gloss
Perfective	Miss Lin ate (or has eaten) the cake.
Inchoative	Miss Lin has started (or is about to eat) cake.
Inceptive	Miss Lin eats cake now (and she did not before).

==== Ever ====
Ever, from Chinese 過 / 过 (guò, Pe̍h-ōe-jī: kòe) expresses the experential aspect, which implies that the state has ended, unlike English's use of ever. It often co-occurs with adverbs like before and last time. It may only be used with repeatable events and is chronologically sound; for example, die cannot be used with ever as dying is not repeatable and is chronologically unsound as dying can only occur at an older age.

It may be used as a standalone response affirmatively.

==== Never ====
Never, from Chinese 不 (bù) and 沒 / 没 (méi), expresses the negative perfective aspect, and may not co-occur with already. It may also be used to negate the experiential aspect, which may result in ambiguity. The verb that never modifies is not put into the past-tense form.

It may be used as a standalone response negatively.

=== Realis mood ===
The realis mood is expressed with got, which is used to assert a fact; it allows expression of the past, the present, the definite future, a habit, a completion or an experiential.

- I got go Japan before. – 'I have been to Japan before.'
- I got go Japan next week. – 'I am going to Japan next week.'

The above sentence cannot be interpreted with the indefinite future, such as "I will go to Japan next week", since the speaker must be certain to make the assertion, for example, if a concrete plan was already decided in advance.

- These days, I got swim ten laps. – 'These days, I swim ten laps.'
- You got wash your hands? – 'Did you finish washing your hands?'
- You got ski? – 'Have you skied before?'

=== Irrealis mood ===
The irrealis mood is expressed with would, which is used to state something that has not happened, and may or may not happen, expressing tentativeness and uncertainty. It is derived from the logical extension of would being more polite than will. While British English also uses would to express politeness and tentativeness, it is restricted to requests, and cannot be used for the irrealis mood.

- I feel that the knowledge would help. – 'I feel that the knowledge can possibly help.'
- It is strongly hoped that the reserved lanes would give priority to public buses. – 'It is strongly hoped that the reserved lanes will give priority to public buses.'

Would may also be used as a variant of will to express the habitual aspect.

== Interrogative ==
Apart from the constructions below, there are also other discourse particles, such as hah, hor, meh, and ah, used in questions. They are discussed at § Discourse particles.

=== Don't know construction ===
The don't know construction is a specific construction of a question. It is always ended with or not and must be asked negatively. The subject must be definite if it appears before don't know, but there is no restriction if it appears after don't know. The subject may also be omitted, but only if it involves the speaker, such as I, we and nobody. Don't know may be replaced with similar phrases like not sure.

- The car he not sure can drive or not. – 'He is not sure if he can drive the car or not.'
- The laksa don't know nice or not. – 'I don't know if the laksa is nice or not.' or 'Nobody knows if the laksa is nice or not.'
- Don't know the laksa nice or not. – 'I don't know if the laksa is nice or not.' or 'Nobody knows if the laksa is nice or not.'
- Don't know a cat got scratch your car or not. – 'I don't know if a cat scratched your car or not.' or 'Nobody knows if a cat scratched your car or not.'

=== Or not construction ===
Or not, possibly from Malay or Hokkien, is appended to the end of sentences to form yes/no questions. It often, but not necessarily, appears with can to acquire permission or ask for feasibility.

- You want this book or not? – 'Do you want this book?'
- Can or not? – 'Is this possible / permissible?'

=== Is it construction ===
The phrase is it, also spelled isit, izit, issit, izzit, and possibly influenced by Mandarin's A-not-A construction, described as a newer development in Singlish in 2023, possibly starting from the 1990s, according to Gonzales et al. It is appended to the end of sentences, which forms yes–no questions, with no prior assumption of correctness from the speaker nor any expectation of an agreement. The verb is and the pronoun it does not vary regardless of the sentence.

Is it may appear clause-initially, and is comparable to the do-support construction; it can be substituted with do. The clause-initial use is used more often in a rhetorical question, and when the speaker is being mischievous. It is also likelier used with younger speakers. It may be used in place of a complementizer, being substitutable with whether or not or if it is.

- It is too sweet, is it? – 'It is too sweet, isn't it?'
- Is it you think I am pretty? – 'Do you think I am pretty?'

The phrase isn't it occurs when the speaker assumes they are correct, and thinks the hearer might disagree or be unhappy with the assertion.

=== Subject-auxiliary inversion ===
In wh-interrogatives, subject-auxiliary inversion is optional—the order of the verb and the subject in an indirect question can be the same as a direct question, but its acceptability by native speakers is variable. However, it must be inverted in sentences such as "Who is that walking by?" instead of "*Who that is walking by?".

- What foods you don't eat? – 'What foods don't you eat?'

=== In-situ substitution ===
The interrogative word may also substitute the object of question.

- Talking about who? – 'Who are you talking about?'

== Reduplication ==
Reduplication, also present in Chinese and Malay, is a productive morphological process involving repeating a word, possibly up to several times. Nouns are reduplicated for intimacy, verbs are reduplicated for attenuation, and adjectives or verbs demonstrating a property are reduplicated for intensification.

=== Verbs ===
Singlish exhibits verb triplication, which according to Ansaldo and Matthews is a rare phenomenon that does not appear in any other English varieties.

==== Eligibility ====
Only verbs with one or two syllables can undergo reduplication. The reduplicated verb cannot be inflected for tense, such as dance-dancing. According to Vivienne Fong, reduplicated verbs must be uninflected, but according to Ho Mian Lian, present participle verbs can be reduplicated.

To undergo reduplication, the verb must represent a possibly indefinitely continuable action and an "activity", defined as being able to co-occur with go and without a rhetorical or pragmatic effect, and able to co-occur with for a while to describe a lasting action instead of a lasting result.

- *Drink drink a glass of beer only what. (Drink a glass of beer is not indefinitely continuable.)
- Drink drink beer. – 'Drink beer for a while.'
- *He only know know a bit. (Go and know is unacceptable; know is not an "activity".)
- *Can walk walk to the beach. (Go and walk is acceptable; walk is an activity. However, walk for a while refers to the result of walking lasting a while, not the walking taking a while.)
- Push push a bit can? – 'Can you push this a bit?' (Go and push is acceptable; push is an "activity". Push for a while refers to the push taking a while, not the result of the push lasting a while.)

==== Effects ====
Finite verbs can be repeated to show that it lasts for a short duration, or that something is done for a little bit, known as attenuation. This is also found in Chinese and Malay.

- The lion want to chase chase to catch him. – 'The lion wanted to chase a little bit to catch him.'
- When I see them, I just nod nod my head. – 'When I see them, I just nod my head a little.'

It may also express a tentative aspect of "just" doing something.

- They all play play only la. Disturb a bit ah. – 'They were all just playing. Poking a bit of fun.'

It may also suggest informality and casualness. This is also found in Chinese and Malay.

- I went there to see see look look. – 'I went there to take a look.'

It may also be used for dramatic effect. This is also found in Chinese, which uses reduplication to create a vivid effect.

- Then she came back from the market, carry the basket of vegetables and this purse put the hand here, walk walk walk up with the two children ... – 'Then she came back from the market, carrying the basket of vegetables and this purse with her hand here, walking up with the two children ...'

It may also show emphasis. This is also found in English, which uses reduplication chiefly to convey urgency, impatience or caution.

- Go go go! Don't hold up the queue. – 'Go! Don't hold up the queue.'

It may also show an iterative, habitual or continuing action. This is also found in Malay.

- Might as well I fax you the list, then you tick tick tick tick what you want. – 'I might as well fax you the list, and you tick repeatedly against what you want.'

Present participles may also be repeated to show an iterative or continuing action.

- When the Singtel was allocated, I think it was $3.60. Everybody was selling selling. Then the price keeps dropping dropping. So can't sell for my mother. – 'When the Singtel shares were allocated, I think it was $3.60. Everybody was constantly selling, so the price kept dropping. So, I couldn't sell them for my mother.'

Verb phrases may also be repeated to show the repetition of the action, and gives a heightened sense of intensity, urgency and drama.

- Sometime I call her, call her, call her—always not at home. – 'Sometimes, I call and call her, but she's always not at home.'
- You just want to fast and pray fast and pray until your prayer is answered. – 'You just want to keep fasting and praying until your prayer is answered.'

=== Nouns ===
Nouns referring to people or pets can be repeated for intimacy. This is also found in Chinese languages like Hokkien and Cantonese, involving mainly kinship terms.

- Where is your boy boy? – 'Where is your son?'
- We buddy buddy. You don't play me out, okay? – 'We're close friends. Don't play me out, okay?'

Names may also be repeated, indicating affection, but must be shortened to one syllable, such as humans or pets.

- I'm looking for Ry Ry. – 'I'm looking for Henry.'
- This is my dog, Su Su. – 'This is my dog, Suzie.'

Nouns that are unlikely of affection are unable to reduplicate, such as Monday, cow and water.

Nouns may also be repeated to suggest a numerous amount, creating an image of the spread of the item. It may also have overtones of disapproval and disgust.

- So heavy, all bottle bottle bottle, how to carry to Australia? – 'It's so heavy, it's all bottles, how are we going to carry these to Australia?'
- My father's diet is all meat meat meat meat meat. He died of a mild stroke. – 'My father's diet was all meat. He died of a mild stroke.'

=== Adjectives ===
Adjectives can be repeated for intensification. This is also found in Chinese and Malay.

- In Hawaii you can do a lot of shopping. In their duty free they have nice nice shirts. – 'In Hawaii, you can do a lot of shopping. In their duty-free shop, they have very nice shirts.'

Comparative adjectives that end in -er are able to reduplicate for intensification, but not superlative adjectives because they cannot be intensified any further. Comparative adjectives that require more such as more selfish cannot reduplicate as it consists of more than one word.

- That one! That greener greener one. – 'That one! That greener one.'

=== Adverbs ===
According to Wee, adverbs do not accept reduplication, such as the adverb loudly, possibly due to the preference of using adjectives over adverbs in Singlish, comparing Singlish "don't laugh so loud" to Standard English "don't laugh so loudly".

However, according to Lian, adverbs can reduplicate for intensification, such as the adverb very, with a lengthened first syllable in very.

- I feel very very interesting la, when you see the clown. – 'I feel that it is very very interesting, when you see the clown.'

== Passive voice ==
=== Kena ===
Kena can be used as an auxiliary to mark the passive voice.

It is derived from a Malay word that means 'to strike or to come into contact with', which does not have any negative meaning by itself, but has an adverse reading when used passively. The lexical verb after kena may appear in the infinitive form or as a past participle. The agent, marked with a by, is optional. It may not be used with a positive thing; the subject must be adversely affected. Usage with a normally positive thing must be interpreted to give an adverse effect. Stative verbs such as believe or know cannot passivise with kena. It is similar in meaning to passive markers in Chinese such as in Mandarin 被 (bèi).

- He kena scold/scolded. – 'He was scolded.'
- Dun listen, later you kena punish/punished then you know. – 'If you don't listen to me, you will be punished, after which you will know that you were wrong.'

When the context is given, kena may be used without a verb to mean 'get something bad'.

- Better do your homework, otherwise you kena. – 'You had better do your homework, otherwise you will get punished.'
- Don't listen to me, later you kena. – 'Don't listen to me, otherwise you may get something bad.'

=== Give ===
Give, at the basilectal level, functions as a marker of the adversarial passive voice, like kena. It is used less pervasively than kena; Vivienne Fong describes it as "rare", quoting its absence in the Singapore English corpora. It originates from the grammaticalization of the passive construction in Chinese variants, such as Mandarin 被 (bèi), Hokkien 予 (hō͘), or Cantonese 畀 (bei2). Give is always used in its base form, while the lexical verb showing adversarial effect can be conjugated in the base form or past participle form. Unlike kena, use of give implies that the adversarial effect is caused by the patient directly or indirectly.

- John give his boss scold. – 'John was scolded by his boss.'

The patient of the adverse effect, which must be animate, is followed by the verb give, then the agent, and finally the verb. Omission of the agent, such as his boss in the above example, is ungrammatical.

== Reflexive pronouns ==
Ownself, possibly derived from a Chinese variety of 自己 (zì jǐ), is similar to reflexive pronouns such as himself or herself, but only as a manner adverbial similar to the clause-final expression by himself, and not as a reflexive marker nor an emphatic marker. Ownself does not have any additional contrastive or emphatic reading.

- Ownself open the door! – 'Open the door by yourself!'

In the above sentence, ownself cannot be replaced with yourself.

- You ownself open the door! – 'Open the door by yourself!'

In the above sentence, ownself is the manner adverbial, but by replacing it with yourself, it becomes an emphatic marker.

Other reflexive pronouns such as himself or herself may also adapt the manner adverbial form without by, but only if it follows a transitive verb.

- He carry the bag himself. – 'He carried the bag by himself.'

Sentences with intransitive verbs such as "*He cry himself" are unacceptable because of blocking; without a by, the reflexive pronoun occupies an ungrammatical direct object position.

== Discourse particles ==
Discourse particles, also known as pragmatic particles, are minimal lexemes that occur at the end of a sentence or clause with a syntactic or pragmatic role. Some pragmatic roles include skepticism and perceived obviousness of a sentence. Omission of discourse particles still result in a grammatical sentence. Particles are used more often when speakers are flustered.

Discourse particles are a distinctive feature and characteristic of Singlish, with lah suggested to be the most famous word, as well as a cultural and national identity. Ah and lah are the most common particles, accounting for 94% of the particles in a speech corpus in Smakman and Wagenaar's research.

The earliest particles, lah, ah, and what, were acquired from Hokkien and Bazaar Malay, while a later set of particles, lor, hor, leh, meh and mah, mostly from Cantonese, were imported with tones intact. Lah, ah and what appear consistently across all registers of Singlish.

Particles keep their tones regardless of the remainder of the sentence.

The use of multiple discourse particles, termed particle stacks or particle complexes, are primarily found in pairs with a declarative particle followed by an interrogative particle. Declarative particles are used for assertions and include lah, leh, lor, and meh. Interrogative particles are used for backchanneling and include ah, ha, eh, and hor. Such declarative-interrogative particle pairs in this order are consistent cross-linguistically with German, Cantonese and Japanese.

=== Ah ===
Ah, also spelled a, from the combination of Hokkien 啊 (a) and Bazaar Malay ah, is highly prominent in Singlish, appearing in 49% of the particles in a speech corpus in Smakman and Wagenaar's research.

Ah can be used for backchanneling, by copying the other party's statement and adding an ah behind. This indicates attentiveness and confirmation.

- A: The red one.
- B: The red one ah? – 'The red one, is that right?'
- A: Yes.

Similarly, it may be used to solicit agreement or a response. Usage in this sense is similar to hor pragmatically.

- Mummy, I go hospital ah. – 'Mummy, I'm going to the hospital, okay?'

It may be used to declaratively hedge a statement and can be compared to the tag question you know or isn't it.

- I feel sad for them ah. – 'I feel sad for them, you know.'

It may also express confidence in one's statement.

- For two hundred dollars, go cruise, just a swab test, a bit of pain, can ah. – 'For two hundred dollars, you go on a cruise; it's just a swab test—there's a bit of pain and that's okay.'

It may be used imperatively.

- Young people, help your uncle and auntie ah! – 'Young people, help your uncle and auntie, okay?'

It may be used vocatively, to directly address a noun, such as a person or a title.

- The army machine ah, he also come to recycle. – 'He also came to recycle at the army's recycling machine.'
- Mummy ah, can help me? – 'Mummy, can you help me?'

It may be used interrogatively, spoken with a low tone. It occurs with questions that insist on a reply, pressuring the listener and hence may appear to be aggressive and confrontational, but it may also be used in a friendly manner.

- What do couples normally do? You know ah? – 'What do couples normally do? You know it?'
- That is a problem ah? – 'Is that a problem?'

Ah may also be used sentence-medially, either after the topic in a topic-prominent sentence, or after a full clause similar to a comma.

- The locals ah, advised us to go there. – 'The locals, you know, advised us to go there.'
- It's not advisable to plunge in ah, but if you were to... – 'It's not advisable to plunge in, you know, but if you were to...'

=== Bah ===
Bah, from Mandarin 吧 / 罷 / 罢 (ba), described as a newer addition to Singlish in 2016 by Jakob Leimgruber, compared to other particles like lah or wat which are documented since the 1970s, due to a shift towards Mandarin in usage compared to other Chinese varieties like Hokkien and Cantonese. It is used to show unsureness or tentativeness.

- Me and this gal are quite on good terms bah. – 'Me an this gal are on quite good terms, I guess.'

=== Can ===
Can is a flexible and pervasive word, that as a discourse particle expresses a firm stance and a desire of approval through assertion.

- Find me at 3 o' clock can? – 'Can you find me at 3 o' clock?'

The stand-alone response, can, showing approval, may be used to replace the common response yes. Cannot or can't on the other hand, shows disapproval and replaces the common response no. It may be combined with a discourse particle, such as lah, liao or lor to convey the nuance of the stance taken.

- Can you give that to me?
  - Can. – 'Yes.'
  - Cannot. – 'No.'

It is also used as a tag question; can may be added to the end to ask for verification. It may also be replaced by can anot, from the phrase can or not, which is used exclusively for permission, obligation and capability.

- Tomorrow meet can anot? – 'Can we meet tomorrow or not?'
- Eat chicken rice can? – 'Can we eat chicken rice?'

It can also be used as a non-auxiliary verb, with the subject and object both omissible.

- My schedule is packed, but Monday can. – 'My schedule is packed, but Monday is okay.'
- Why can't? It should be easy. – 'Why can't you? It should be easy.'

=== Dei ===
Dei, also spelled dey, from a clipping of Malay adik 'brother' or Tamil டேய் (ṭēy) 'hey', is used sentence-finally as a form of familiar address and for exclamation. It may be combined with lah, forming lah dei, to show obviousness. Dei is associated with Indian masculinity; non-Indian speakers feel that dey is racial appropriation and hesitate to use dei.

- Bro, water parade finish dei. – 'Bro, the water parade is already done!'
- Driving lah dei. – 'I'm clearly driving.'

It may also be used sentence initially as a term of address, sometimes as an exclamation. Chinese speakers are less inclined to use dei this way than sentence-finally, possibly due to substrate influence from Chinese and to compensate for the foreignness associated with dei.

- Dei, you high ah? – 'Bro, are you high?'

=== Hah ===
Hah is used to mark a question, which may come after a wh-interrogative or a declarative.

- Who shall I invite for the BBQ hah? – 'Who shall I invite for the BBQ?'
- Sorry I am late. You have eaten lunch hah? – 'Sorry, I am late. Have you eaten lunch?'

It may not appear with auxiliary fronted interrogatives, such as "*Is he going hah?".

It may be used alone to ask for an earlier utterance to be repeated.

=== Hor ===
Hor, from Hokkien 乎 (hōⁿ) and Cantonese 嗬 (ho2), is used to mark a proposition as easily recallable and accessible information. It may be used in a rising tone or a falling tone with distinct meanings.

The rising tone creates a check on whether the proposition is readily accessible information, and may be used to solicit agreement, or stand-alone to solicit agreement for a previous statement after silence. Usage in this sense is similar to ah pragmatically. It can only follow a declarative form and not a wh-interrogative or polar interrogative where the auxiliary is fronted, for example, "*Where's the box hor?" is unacceptable.

- This shopping centre very nice hor? – 'This shopping centre is very nice, isn't it?'
- This shopping centre very nice... (extended silence) Hor? – 'This shopping centre is very nice... right?'

It may also be used to indicate assumption of agreement if no objection is given, but still expects the listener to respond with an agreement.

- If you have no problems with Tuesday hor, then I will reschedule my tuition session. – 'If you have no problems with Tuesday, yeah, then I will reschedule my tuition session.'

It may also be used mid-sentence like a filler after a topic.

- Then hor, another person came out of the house. – 'Then, yeah, another person came out of the house.'

The falling tone is used to create a reminder, which may or may not be negative, since hor indicates an instruction to keep the proposition accessible.

- Don't call him a little monster hor. – 'Don't call him a little monster, okay.'
- Give me $20 later hor. – 'Remember to give me $20 later.'

The above sentence is not acceptable with now in place of later since it would no longer be a reminder.

According to Lee, ya hor, an expression of agreement, and orh hor, an expression of accusation, are considered expressions that do not compositionally involve the discourse particle hor, evidenced by how ya hor cannot be replaced with *yes hor.

=== Know ===
Know, from English you know, is used to remind or inform the listener about the importance and consequence of the statement. It cannot appear with other discourse particles, and can only be used clause-finally.

- The bus is late, know. – 'The bus is late, you know?'

=== Lah ===
Lah, also spelled la, from the combination of Hokkien 啦 (la), Bazaar Malay or Malay lah, and Cantonese 啦 (laa1), is recognised as stereotypical of English spoken in Singapore and Malaysia by both native speakers and non-speakers; usage is important to partake in their speech communities. It is seen as a national and cultural identity. It was also the most researched particle by 2003, focusing on its use to show solidarity and its pragmatic functions.

It is highly prominent in Singlish, appearing in 44% of the particles in a speech corpus in Smakman and Wagenaar's research.

Besemeres and Wierzbicka summarise the use of lah as "I think that you can know what I want to say"; lah expects the listener to be able to understand and is always addressed to a person. This accounts for the range of meanings lah can have, such as: rapport, persuasion, impatience, obviousness, emphasis, friendliness and uncertainty. It also accounts for how lah imparts a sense of completeness after a sequence of narration.

Hence, rhetorical questions accept lah, but factual questions do not.

- What to do lah! – 'Oh, whatever I shall do!'
- What for lah! – 'Oh, what for!'
- *What are you doing lah?
- *Where you want me to put this lah?

It directs the attention to the mood of the speaker. It also softens the force of an utterance and expresses solidarity. Hence, it occurs frequently with expressions of agreement like okay lah.

- What do you want to talk about?
- Anything under the sun lah. – 'Anything under the sun.'

The use of lah with a longer duration changes its meaning to signal power, coldness and increased social distance. The short lah, which lasts around 300 milliseconds, also described as "unstressed" or "contracted" by Kwan-Terry, differs only in duration with the long lah, which lasts around 700 milliseconds; they are both pronounced at the same frequency with the same tone.

- You stupid lah. (pronounced short) – 'You're stupid, haha.'
- You stupid lah. (pronounced long) – 'You're stupid, I mean it.'

It may be used to emphasise the clause that occurs before it. It may be used sentence-finally, after a non-verb phrase, or between the first auxiliary verb and a second auxiliary verb in a verb phrase.

- The dog ate the food lah. – 'The dog really ate the food.'
- The dog lah ate the food. – 'It really was the dog that ate the food'.
- He must lah have been cooking. – 'It really must be that he has been cooking.'

The meaning of lah primarily depends on its pitch height (high, mid, low) and pitch contour (falling, rising, rise-fall and fall-rise). It secondarily depends on its duration (short, long). It tertiarily depends on stress, which can occur independently of the previously mentioned characteristics.

A low falling lah with short duration or a stressed high rise-fall lah of short duration is used to express authority. A high lah with a rise-fall, rising, or falling pitch contour of a long duration is used to express irritation.

=== Leh ===
Leh, also spelled lei and le, from Cantonese 哩 (le1), is used mostly by Chinese speakers only. It has an element of 'what about?'.

It indicates new information to the listener and is used to disagree with a suggestion, or to forestall a possible disagreement.

- You can walk her there, very far leh. – 'You can walk her there, it's too far and I disagree with you.'
- Forty dollars only leh. – 'It's only forty dollars, if you don't think it's cheap, I do.'

It is also used with questions that make a comparison.

- My parents very old fashion ah? Then your parents leh? – 'Are you saying that my parents are old-fashioned? Then what about your parents?'

It can be used to soften a disagreement, question, opinion, or protest.

- Technically wrong leh. – 'It's technically kind of wrong...'
- How come you don't give me leh? – 'Why aren't you giving it to me?'
- Very bad leh, make him buy. – 'It's kind of bad that we're making him buy it...'
- I cannot take it. Tired leh. – 'I cannot take it. I'm kind of tired.'

It can be used to make a tentative reminder.

- There's still your mushroom potage leh. – 'There's still your mushroom potage, yeah?'

It can be used to show helplessness and uncertainty, signalling that nothing can be done or said about the situation.

- A: Confirm going already ah? – 'Is it confirmed that you're already going?'
- B: Don't know leh... – 'I don't know...'

It can be used to ask for support and agreement.

- I asked my brother to bring it for me. It should be okay... it's better than me going home and taking it leh. – '...it's better than me going home and taking it, don't you agree?'

Especially when on a low tone, it can be used to show the speaker's disapproval:

- You call her walk there, very far leh. – 'If you ask her to go there on foot, it will be a rather long distance.'

=== Lor ===
Lor, also spelled loh or lo, from Cantonese 囖 or 咯 (lo1), indicates obviousness or resignation, or dismissiveness, in which nothing can be done about a situation; one has to accept the situation or its consequences.

- Dun have work to do, den go home lor. – 'If you're done working, obviously you should go home.'
- Kay lor, you go and do what you want. – 'Fine, go ahead and do what you want.'

According to Wee, lor was initially used only to indicate obviousness, but through grammaticalization and appealing to metonymy, it gained an additional sense to indicate resignation, due to a pragmatic change to express subjectivity with the speaker's beliefs.

=== Mah ===
Mah, also spelled ma, from Cantonese 嘛 (maa3), is used to assert that something is obvious.

- This one also can work one mah! – 'This one also can work one, obviously.'
- He also know about it mah! – 'He also knew about it, clearly.'

According to Gupta, it "appears to be no difference" with the discourse particle wat; both express obviousness, but Wee writes that mah shows obviousness without any contradiction unlike wat. Use of mah is indicative of a Chinese background, unlike wat, which is not indicative of ethnicity or education.

=== Meh ===
Meh, also spelled mei and me, from Cantonese 咩 (me1), is pronounced with a high level tone. Meh is only used after a declarative sentence or a sentence fragment, expecting a yes or no answer. It is used to form questions expressing surprise or skepticism, questioning a presupposition.

- You don't know meh? – 'You don't know? I thought you would've known.'
- You not asleep meh? – 'Shouldn't you have been asleep? I thought you would've been sleeping.'

It may also be used sarcastically, forming a rhetorical question, in a way that questions their presupposition.

- If I say I don't like, you will stop meh? – 'If I say I don't like you, do you really think you will stop?'

It is also used to signal surprise when a presupposition is contradicted.

- A: It's $40.
- B: Not $109 meh? – 'It's not $109?'
- A: Got discount. – 'There's a discount.'

It is more common with the Chinese compared to Malays and Indians.

=== Nia ===
Nia, from Hokkien 爾 or 尔 (niā), means 'only'. It may also be perceived as being dismissive. While the original Hokkien word is used as an adverb, it underwent grammaticalization, turning into a clause-final discourse particle.

- I not so old lah, I 18 nia. – 'I am not so old, I am only 18.'

Nia may also be used for intensification when it follows an adjective.

- Should still have lah, now so early nia. – 'They should still have it, it's still so early now.'

=== One ===
One, from Cantonese 嘅 (ge3), Hokkien 個 or 个 (ê), Mandarin 的 (de), English one, Malay yang and Bazaar Malay mia, is suggested to be a common and culturally significant word by Wong, demonstrating the direct attitude the society has.

It is used with declarative sentences to express confidence and definitiveness, as well as for giving advice.

- This one got milk one. – 'This one has milk.'
- You must always have a back-up copy one. – 'You must always have a back-up copy.'

Additionally, it may be used to form a question, which makes a request for a definitive answer.

- The real game no time one, right? – 'The real game has no time limit, right?'

Additionally, it can be used singulatively, which emphasises that the item is particularly special out of all the items in the group.

- That car got no number one. – '(Out all of cars,) that car has no [license] number.'

Finally, it can be used emphatically, which may make the sentence sound over-exaggerated. It may be glossed in English as "I'm thinking about this; I can't not think about it like this; You have to think about this the same way".

- Last night I lost $40. Always $40 one, you know. – 'Last night, I lost $40. It's always $40, you know.'

As such, it appears often with words of confidence such as definitely and overstatements like always, but is unacceptable with epistemic words such as maybe and understatements like nowadays. Wong suggests that this reflects the Singaporean culture of being overtly confident and willing to impose opinions on others, in contrast to the Anglo culture of acknowledging different perspectives and understating things with epistemic words.

=== Sia ===
Sia, also spelled siah, from the Malay vulgar word sial, is used to express emphasis. It establishes an in-group relationship and a deeper level of intimacy in an interaction.

- I lazy sia. – 'I am lazy.'

In Malay, it often appears as sial ah at the start of utterances. According to Khoo, this may have been rebracketed as sia lah since lah is a common discourse particle, giving rise to sia.

The Malay vulgar word sial functions like damn in English and has the nuance of misfortune; Singaporean Malay speakers tend to classify people who use sial as uneducated men of lower socio-economic class. As such, women and older people are less likely to use sia. In particular, Malay women strongly avoid using sia, while the younger population strongly continue to use sia. Many Chinese and Indian Singaporeans do not know the origin of sia, allowing them to more easily use sia, even though they have feelings that it is a newer, coarser and more masculine word.

=== Wat ===
Wat, also spelled what, possibly calqued from Hokkien 嘛 (ma) or Cantonese 嘛 (maa3), is said with a low tone, which is a step lower than the pitch of the previous syllable.

It is used to remind or contradict the listener, and is used to override any possible disagreement. It is primarily used for four functions: objection, discontent, agreement elicitation, and opinion mitigation.

- But he very good at Maths wat. – 'But he is very good at mathematics.'
- You never give me wat! – 'You didn't give it to me!'
- Quite a nice place wat, no? – 'It's quite a nice place, don't I know it, no?'
- The quality not bad wat. – 'I think the quality is not bad.'

According to Gupta, there "appears to be no difference" with the discourse particle mah; both express obviousness, but Wee writes that wat shows obviousness with contradiction unlike mah. Use of wat is not indicative of ethnicity or education, unlike mah, which is indicative of a Chinese background.

=== Wor ===
Wor, from Cantonese 喎 (wo3), is used to report hearsay and give a reminder.

- Got cocktails wor. – 'I heard there are cocktails.'
- Your shirt still with me wor. – 'Remember, your shirt is still with me.'

It can also show surprise and realisation.

- This new song not bad wor. – 'This new song is surprisingly not bad.'

It can also express irony and sarcasm.

- Wow, playing mahjong? Taitai wor. – 'Wow, playing mahjong? You're such a retired lady.'

=== Ya ===
Ya, also spelled yah, described as a relatively new discourse particle in 2010 by Lionel Wee, and is comparable with yeah in British English. Use of a sentence-final ya is distinct from the affirmative ya or yes. It is more likely to be used by young women as a politeness strategy.

It is used to mark a statement one deems to be relatively uncontroversial, which cannot be used if the statement's truth is challenged.

- Most people don't know much about psychology, ya. – 'Most people don't know much about psychology.'

It may also be used to ask a question, but only if it is used to end an enumeration of examples one deems to be relatively uncontroversial.

- I want to ask you about the teachers in the schools, do they bring the children on trips, visits to museums, temples or other cultural activities, ya. – 'I want to ask you about ... cultural activities, this sounds right, doesn't it?'
