= Sam Lo =

Singaporean contemporary street artist

- 罗欣慧
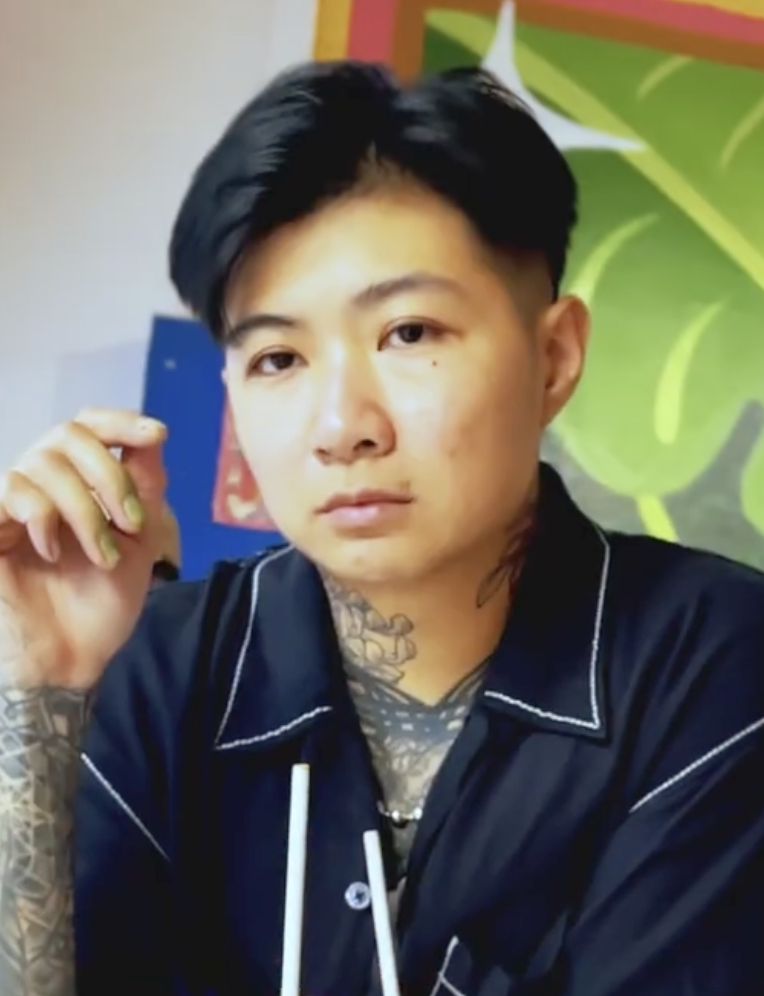
- Lo in 2023
- Born: 1986 (age 39–40); Singapore
- Known for: Street art, public art
- Movement: Contemporary art
- Website: https://skl0.com/

Sam Lo (Note: Chinese: 罗欣慧; pinyin: Luó Xīnhuì) (born 1986), also known by the moniker SKL0, is a Singaporean contemporary artist known for their spray paint mural artworks and guerrilla-style art in public spaces. In 2012, they (Note: Lo uses they/he pronouns.) were arrested for sticking messages on traffic signal buttons and spray painting a public road, becoming a household name in Singapore after being dubbed the "Sticker Lady." Their arrest sparked a local debate over the state's definitions of art and vandalism. Lo has since come out as non-binary and trans.

== Personal life ==
Lo was a former CHIJ Katong Convent student. Lo was dubbed the "Sticker Lady" for their pasting of stickers utilising Singlish phrases, such as Press Until Shiok and Anyhow Paste Kena Fine, at traffic-light junctions and public spaces. In 2012, Lo was arrested for spray painting the words "My Grandfather Road" on Maxwell Road and Robinson Road. Their arrest by the police for vandalism sparked an outcry over their work, prompting debates over whether it could be seen as a work of art or vandalism. They were later charged for mischief and sentenced to 240 hours of community service in 2013.

== Career ==
In 2009, Lo founded online magazine RCGNTN as a way to recognise local artists and talent. They were also a content curator for the National Gallery Singapore's Canvas project.

In 2012, Lo was arrested for vandalism for pasting satirical stickers on traffic light buttons such as Press Once Can Already and Press Until Shiok as well as spray painting the words My Grandfather Road on several roads in the Central Business District. They were motivated to "take back the streets to make Singapore feel like Singapore again," a response to the fast-changing cityscape of the city. Netizens took to the internet to weigh in their views and started a petition to lessen their sentence, in the process birthing the identity of the "Sticker Lady." Lo was then charged in 2013 for mischief instead of vandalism which carried a heavier sentence.

They then proceeded to work with numerous brands and agencies, notably Sentosa's The People's Republic showing satirical signs currently on display on the island. Lo made their debut at Affordable Art Fair in 2013 with a series of Yakult-inspired paintings and art collectibles that served as a statement on the commodification of art as a sign of status- each painting bore the words "More cultured than you will ever be!", a witty take on the cultured milk drink. This collection was reflective of Lo's post-sticker lady state as they questioned their identity as an artist.

In 2015, they held their first solo exhibition, the LIMPEH Show, at The Substation, comprising their LIMPEH portrait series of Lee Kuan Yew. The series started in 2011 as wheatpaste art on A4-sized papers and stickers which were later commissioned by collectors into collage paintings.

On 5 November 2016, Lo painted the largest My Grandfather Road in chalk for Circular Spectacular. The chalk painting measured 170 metres long, the biggest the artist has attempted as yet.

Lo held their second exhibition, Greetings From Singapore in January 2017. On display were photographs of socially satirical stickers pasted in public spaces together that served as 'photographic evidence' of their work on the streets, leading viewers and those who are familiar with their work to question the need to document these social interruptions in a city notorious for its cleanliness. These photographs were accompanied by newspaper clippings and old photographs of the original stickers and spray paint they were arrested for in 2012. At the exhibition, they also launched a photography book of the same title chronicling their work on the streets from 2012.

== Exhibitions ==
Year	Title	Description	Location
2015	LIMPEH Show	First solo exhibition. Portrait series of the late Lee Kuan Yew inspired by American street-artist Shepard Fairey's iconic Obey poster.	The Substation Gallery, Singapore
January 2017	Greetings From Singapore	Second exhibition held as part of Singapore Art Week. Photographs of socially satirical stickers in public spaces.	One East Asia, Singapore
October 2017	For Better, For Worse by SKL0	Third solo exhibition. Acrylic and game series inspired by challenges of living in a First World City.	Besser Space, Melbourne
January 2018	Progress: The Game of Leaders	Interactive showcase. Sculpture based on Singapore's current socio-political landscape.	The Arts House, Singapore
