= Johnny Lau =

Singaporean comics artist

- Born: 1971 (age 54–55)
- Notable works: Mr. Kiasu and 跳班 (Jump Class) comic series

Johnny Lau
- Simplified Chinese: 刘夏宗
- Traditional Chinese: 劉夏宗
Transcriptions
Standard Mandarin
- Hanyu Pinyin: Liú Xiàzōng
Yue: Cantonese
- Jyutping: lau4 haa6 zung1

Johnny Lau (刘夏宗) is a Singaporean artist famous for his iconic comic series Mr Kiasu. Since the 1990s, Lau has been appointed creative director or co-producer of a number of projects with various art and design forms, including publishing, TV, interior design, and mentor for youth talents.

== Career ==
In 1987, Lau graduated from the University of Southern California, Los Angeles, with a bachelor's degree in architecture. Rather than pursuing his career as an architect, Lau followed his passion for publishing and design and founded his first creation studio in 1990. Lau was subsequently appointed creative director or co-producer of a number of artistic projects, working with McDonald's, 7-Eleven and Singapore government agencies such as the Ministry of Information, Communications and the Arts (MICA) (renamed MCI since 2012). Lau has also been co-planning regional events for organisations such as the Asia-Europe Foundation (ASEF) and is currently working with Ashoka Foundation, Washington D.C. To date, Lau founded a dozen startups in the area of publishing, retail, distribution and licensing. Recent endeavours include a musical production company based in Shanghai.

- In the 1990s, Lau created the character of Mr Kiasu followed by 12 comics books and a TV show.
- From 2004 to 2013, Lau served as creative director for the Gallery Hotel. He was instrumental in directing a successful range of well-received artistic events. Lau also initiated the Creative Youth Xchange Challenge promoting youth talents from the Pacific Asia region where participants were residing at the Gallery Hotel for two weeks to re-create the design of hotel rooms amongst other challenges.
- In 2009, Lau co-produced HP Space – a reality show with a Hong Kong TV star. The eight-week program recorded a wide audience with more than 20 million viewers in the Asia Pacific region.
- Since 2012, Lau has been drawing the weekly comics strip Jump Class (跳班) for Zaobao's student paper, Thumbs Up. Jump Class was planned to be produced as a TV show in 2014. In 2015, a TV series consisting of ten episodes was produced.

== Main characters ==
Mr Kiasu character originated in the eponymous Singaporean concept of kiasu. Although Mr Kiasu personified Singaporeans during the 1990s, Lau sees Kiasuism as "a cross-section of certain demographics" rather than a concept "deeply rooted in Chinese culture such as Old Master Q". Lau considers the character to be very different from his own personality, deflating the assumption that Mr Kiasu is a reflection of Lau himself. Mr Kiasu featured in advertisements for McDonald's Kiasu Burger, which sold more than a million over a period of two months. A television series starring Chew Chor Meng was also created in 2001.

In 2012, Lau created Jump Class (跳班) comics and the protagonist Wang Xiaofeng (王小丰), who is capable of jumping from the Quick-Quick rational world (快快) to the Happy creative world (乐乐) and experience two different systems and cultures.

== Books ==
- Mr. Kiasu: Everything Also I Want (1990, Santa Advertising and Marketing) ISBN 9810021690
- Mr. Kiasu: Everything Also Must Grab (1991, Comix Factory) ISBN 9810028938
- Singapore Shampoo (1991, SNP Publishers) ISBN 9810027141
- Mr. Kiasu: Everything Also Number One (1992, Comix Factory) ISBN 9810039549
- The Neow Brothers: Curse of the Missing Chewing Gum (1992, Comix Factory) ISBN 9810039530
- Roti, Kaya and Guyu (1993, Comix Factory) ISBN 9810048653
- Mr. Kiasu: Everything Also Want Extra (1993, Comix Factory) ISBN 9810046391
- Mr. Kiasu: Everything Also Scared Lose (1994, Comix Factory) ISBN 9810059140
- Kiasu Krossover (1994, Comix Factory) ISBN 9810054858
- K.S.X: Kiasu the Xtraman (1995, Comix Factory)
- The Return of the Hosomes! (1995, Singapore Courtesy Council) ISBN 9810070845
- Kiasu Krossover 2 (1995, Comix Factory) ISBN 9810066562
- Kiasu Krossover 3 (1996, Comix Factory) ISBN 9810081286
- Mr. Kiasu: Everything Also Sure Win Lah! (1996, Comix Factory) ISBN 9810081316
- Mr. Kiasu: Everything Also Talk Money (1997, Comix Factory) ISBN 9810098758
- Mr. Kiasu: Everything Also Act Blur (1999, Publishing Consultant) ISBN 9810402376
- Go Home: 12 Moving Stories (co-editor, 2008, Rojak City) ISBN 9789810809065
- Hotel University: From Hospitality to Possibilities (2010) ISBN 9789810870874
- "Jump Class" (跳班 1) (2013)ISBN 9789810741990
- "Jump Class" (跳班 2) (2014)ISBN 9789810902483
- Mr. Kiasu: Think Sure (2014, Rojak City Pte Ltd)
- Mr Kiasu: Everything Also Like Real (2017, Shogakukan Asia) ISBN 978-981-11-3682-5
- Mr Kiasu: Everything Also First Class (2018, Shogakukan Asia) ISBN 978-981-11-8154-2
- SupeRich (2018, Shogakukan Asia) ISBN 978-981-11-8155-9
