= Languages of Singapore =

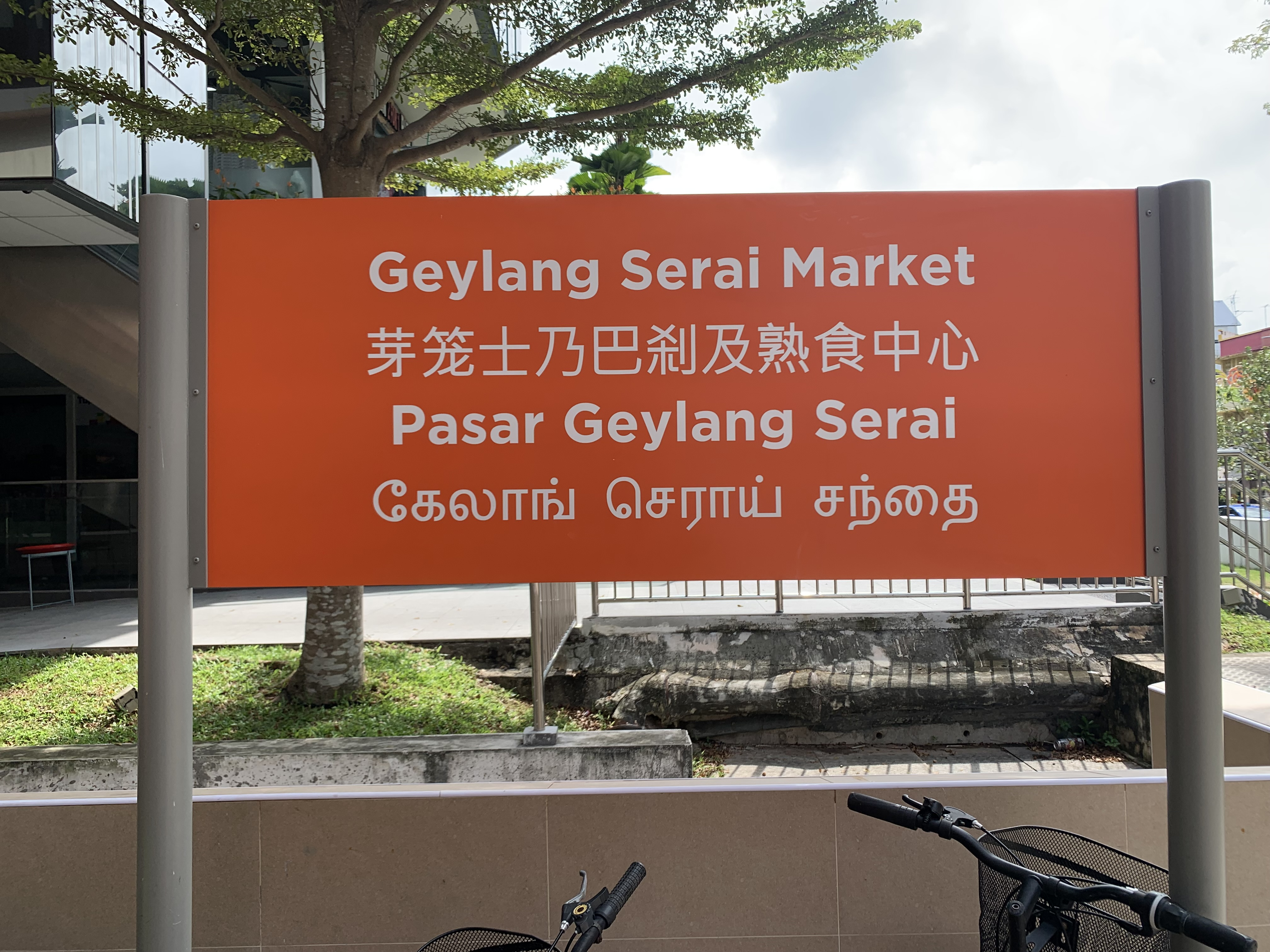
- A sign for a food market in the country's four official languages: English, Mandarin, Malay and Tamil.
- Official: English, Mandarin, Malay, Tamil
- National: English (de facto); Malay (de jure)
- Vernacular: Singapore English (formal), Singlish (informal)
- Minority: Hokkien, Cantonese, Teochew, Hainanese, Hakka, Javanese, Punjabi, Malayalam, Telugu, Bazaar Malay, Baba Malay, Kristang, Hokchew, Hokchia, Henghua, Shanghainese
- Immigrant: Armenian, Arabic, Bengali, Hebrew, Hindustani, Indonesian, Japanese, Korean, Portuguese, Sindhi, Kannada
- Foreign: Dutch, French, German, Italian, Russian, Spanish, Filipino, Thai, Turkish, Vietnamese, Burmese, Khmer, Lao
- Signed: Singapore Sign Language
- Keyboard layout: QWERTY

The official languages of Singapore are English, Mandarin Chinese, Malay and Tamil. Spoken natively by the majority of Singaporeans, English is the de facto main language in daily, governmental, legal, trade and commercial affairs. Among themselves, Singaporeans often speak Singlish, a contact language arising from centuries of contact between Singapore's multi-ethnic and multilingual society and its legacy as a British colony. The Constitution of Singapore designates Malay as the national language of Singapore. This plays a symbolic role as Malays are constitutionally recognised as the indigenous peoples of Singapore, and is also largely due to Singapore's geographical location in the Malay Archipelago.

In the early years, the lingua franca of the island was Bazaar Malay (Melayu Pasar), a creole of Malay and Chinese, the language of trade in the Malay Archipelago. English gained prominence during the British rule of Singapore as the language of government, law and business. Upon independence, English became the official medium of instruction across all levels of education in Singapore due to the country's heavy reliance on international trade, commerce and finance, thus displacing Malay as the common language. The three languages other than English were chosen to correspond with the major ethnic groups present in Singapore at the time: Mandarin Chinese had gained pre-eminent status with the overseas Chinese since the introduction of Chinese-medium schools; Malay was deemed the "most obvious choice" for the Malay community; and Tamil for the largest Indian ethnic group in Singapore. In 2009, more than 20 languages were identified as being spoken in Singapore, reflecting a rich linguistic diversity in the city. Singapore's historical roots as a trading settlement gave rise to an influx of foreign traders, and their languages were slowly embedded in Singapore's modern day linguistic repertoire.

Hokkien (Min Nan) briefly emerged as a lingua franca among the Chinese, but by the late 20th century it had been eclipsed by Mandarin. The Government emphasises Mandarin Chinese amongst Chinese Singaporeans, as the Government views Mandarin as lingua franca between the diverse non-Mandarin speaking groups which form the Chinese Singaporean community (derived historically from the various regions of Southern China), and as a tool for forging a common Chinese cultural identity within Singapore. Mainland China's economic rise in the 21st century has also encouraged a greater use of Mandarin, particularly Simplified Chinese. Other Chinese varieties such as Hokkien, Teochew, Hakka, Hainanese and Cantonese have been classified by the Government as "dialects"; governmental language policies on the use of “dialects”, such as the elimination of non-Mandarin Chinese ("Chinese dialects") usage in official settings, heavy restrictions of “dialect” use in television and radio media, the non-provision of non-Mandarin “dialects” language classes within the national education system, along with changing societal language attitudes based on perceived economic value, have led to language attrition and a sharp decrease in the number of speakers of these varieties of colloquial ancestral “dialects”, especially amongst the younger generations. In particular, Singapore has its own lect of Mandarin; Singaporean Mandarin, itself with two varieties, Standard and Colloquial or spoken. While Tamil is one of Singapore's official and the most spoken Indian language, other Indian languages are also frequently used by minorities.

Almost all Singaporeans are bilingual, as Singapore's bilingual language education policy mandates a dual-language learning system, with English being the main medium of instruction. Learning a second language has been compulsory in primary schools since 1960 and secondary schools since 1966; children are required to learn one of the three official languages as a second language, according to their official registered ethnic group (the associated language is classified as a “Mother Tongue” language). Since 1 January 2011, if a person is of more than one ethnicity and their race is registered in the hyphenated format, the race chosen will be the one that precedes the hyphen in their registered race. Within the national education system, students are also eligible to learn another approved third language, of their choice.

In modern Singapore, contemporary language issues frequently discussed involve the widespread and increasing language attrition of the second languages (ethnic Mother Tongue languages) amongst Singaporeans, due to the pervasive use of the English language in daily life within Singapore and its households.

== English as the de facto main language of Singapore ==
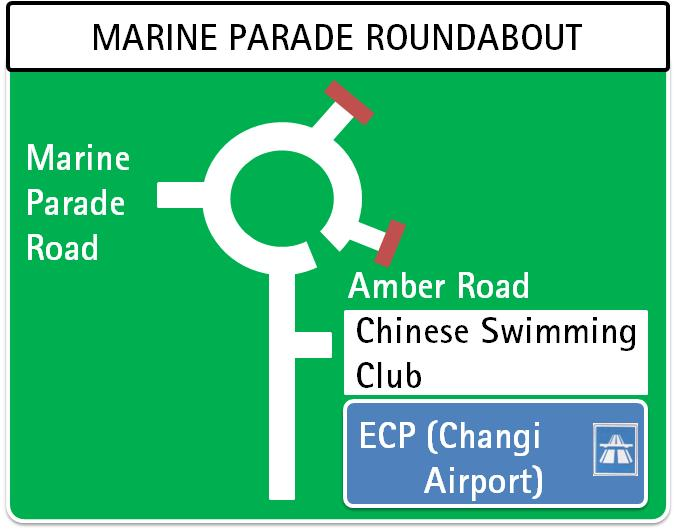
All directional signs in Singapore are written in English.

Although Malay is de jure national language, Singapore English is regarded de facto as the main language in Singapore, and is officially the main language of instruction in all school subjects except for Mother Tongue lessons in Singapore's education system. It is also the common language of the administration and is promoted as an important language for international business. Spelling in Singapore largely follows British conventions, owing to the country's status as a former Crown Colony. English is the country's default lingua franca despite the fact that four languages have official status.

Under the British colonial government, English gained prestige as the language of administration, law and business in Singapore. As government administration increased, infrastructure and commerce developed, and access to education further catalysed the spread of English among Singaporeans.

When Singapore gained self-government in 1959 and independence in 1965, the local government decided to keep English as the main language to maximise economic benefits. Since English was rising as the global language for commerce, technology and science, promotion of its use in Singapore would expedite Singapore's development and integration into the global economy.

Furthermore, the switch to English as the only medium of instruction in schools aided in bridging the social distance between the various groups of ethnic language speakers in the country. Between the early 1960s to the late 1970s, the number of students registering for primarily English-medium schools leapt from 50% to 90% as more parents elected to send their children to English-medium schools. Attendance in Mandarin, Malay and Tamil-medium schools consequently dropped and schools began to close down. The Chinese-medium Nanyang University also made the switch to English as the medium of instruction despite meeting resistance, especially from the Chinese community.

There has been a steep increase in the use of the English language over the years. Singapore is currently one of the most proficient English-speaking countries in Asia. Then Education Minister, Ng Eng Hen, noted a rising number of Singaporeans using English as their home language in December 2009. Of children enrolled in primary school in 2009, 60% of the Chinese and Indian pupils and 35% of the Malay pupils spoke predominantly English at home. As of 2025, the majority of Singaporeans speak English as their primary language.

Language most frequently spoken at home (%)
	English	Mandarin	Other Chinese	Malay	Tamil	Others
1990	18.8%	23.7%	—N/a	14.3%	2.9%	—N/a
2000	23.0%	35.0%	23.8%	14.1%	3.2%	0.9%
2010	32.3%	35.6%	14.3%	12.2%	3.3%	2.3%
2015	36.9%	34.9%	12.2%	10.7%	3.3%	2.0%
2020	48.3%	29.9%	8.7%	9.2%	2.5%	1.4%
2025	58.1%	26.6%	4.9%	7.0%	2.2%	1.3%

== Singlish ==
Singlish is an English-based contact language with its own consistent rules and phonology widely used in Singapore. Linguists formally define it as Singapore Colloquial English. However, usage of this language is discouraged by the local government, which favours Standard English. The Media Development Authority does not support using Singlish in television and radio advertising.

According to a 2018 study by the Institute of Policy Studies (IPS), only 8% of Singaporeans identify with Singlish as their primary language, compared to the one-third that identify with English and another 2% with their official mother tongue. Both survey waves, in 2013 and 2018, conducted showed that about half of all respondents reported being able to speak Singlish "well" or "very well". Younger respondents (18–25 years old) reported greater proficiency than older respondents (65+ years old).

Over the years, the use of Singlish has become more widespread, with a greater number of people adopting the language both out of a sense of identity and cultural importance. Some even view that it identifies them as uniquely Singaporean.

== Chinese ==
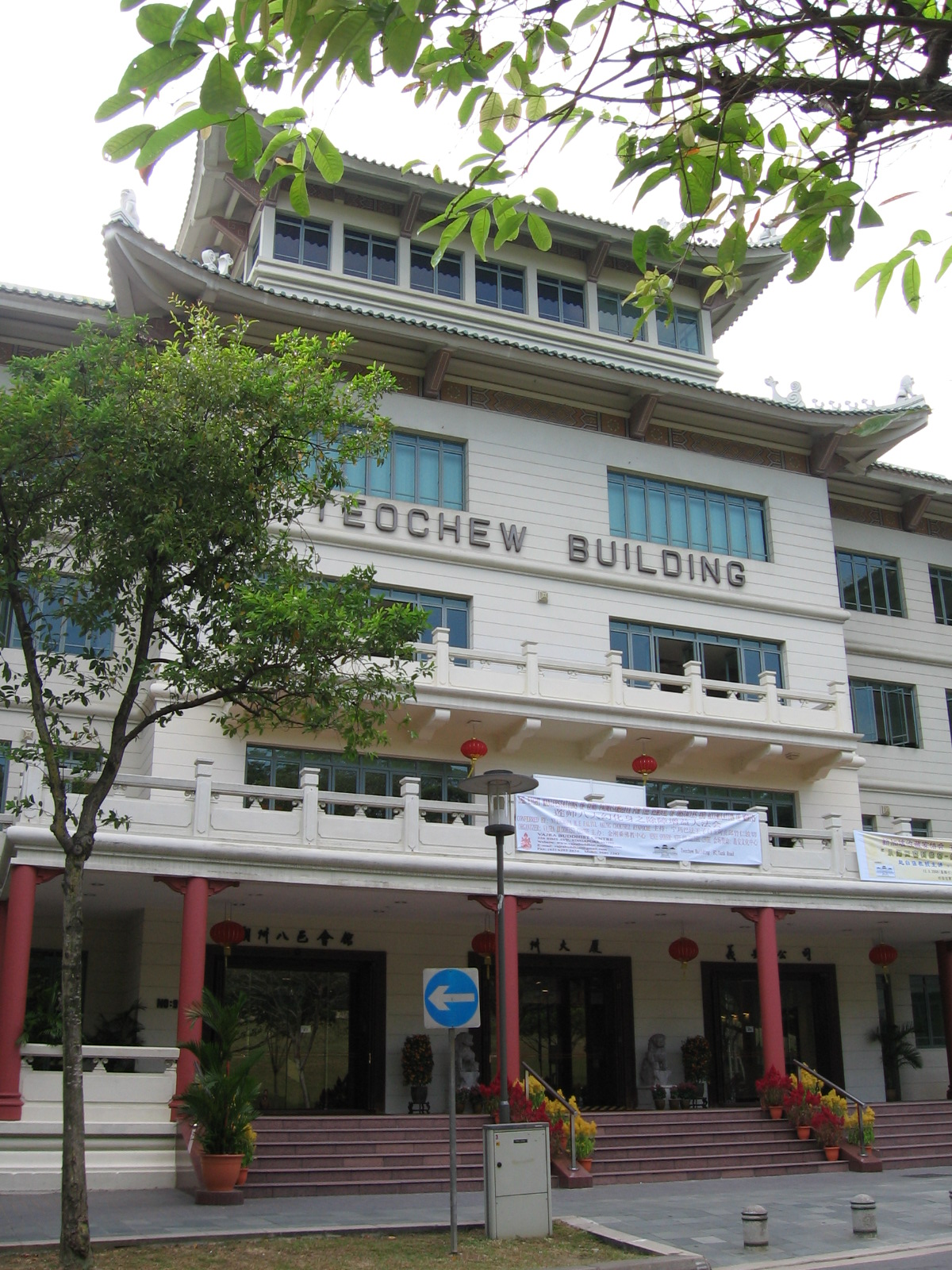
The Teochew Building houses a prominent Teochew clan association in Singapore, the Ngee Ann Kongsi.

According to the 2020 population census, Mandarin and other varieties of Chinese are the second most common languages spoken at home. They are used by 38.6% of the population.

The table below shows the change in distribution of Mandarin and other Chinese varieties, as well as English, as home languages of the resident Chinese population of Singapore over the decades. From 1990 to 2010, it can be observed that the percentage of the population which speaks English and Mandarin increased, while the percentage of those who speak other Chinese varieties has collapsed and is now limited mainly to the elderly. From 2010, the number of Mandarin speakers has also declined in favour of English.

English is starting to displace Mandarin among the new generation of Singapore Chinese, due to long term effects of the pervasive usage of English in daily public, governmental and commercial settings over Mandarin, the dominant usage of English as the medium of instruction in Singapore schools, colleges and universities, and the limited and lower standards of local mother education system over the years in Singapore.

Language most frequently spoken at home among Chinese resident population aged 5 and over
	Total	English		Mandarin		Other Chinese varieties		Others	
	Total	#	%	#	%	#	%	#	%
1990	1,884,000	363,400	19.3%	566,200	30.1%	948,100	50.3%	6,400	0.3%
2000	2,236,100	533,900	23.9%	1,008,500	45.1%	685,800	30.7%	7,900	0.4%
2010	2,527,562	824,616	32.6%	1,206,556	47.7%	485,765	19.2%	10,625	0.4%
2015			37.4%		46.1%		16.1%		0.4%
2020			47.6%		40.2%		11.8%		0.4%

=== Standard Mandarin ===
Standard Mandarin, often simply known as Chinese, is the designated mother tongue or 'ethnic language' of Chinese Singaporeans, at the expense of the other Chinese varieties that form the ancestral vernaculars of groups that comprise the Chinese Singaporean community.

In 1979, the government heavily promoted Mandarin through its "Speak Mandarin" campaign. The Prime Minister Lee Kuan Yew stated that Mandarin was chosen to unify the Chinese community with a single language, and to avoid intra-Chinese segregationism, disunity and disharmony within the Chinese Singaporean community. With the rising prominence of Mandarin in Singapore at that time, politicians such as Lee theorised that it might overtake English, despite strong evidence to the contrary. From the 1990s, with the perceived increase in commerce and trade possibilities with Mainland China, the Singaporean government promoted Mandarin as a language with high economic advantage and value. Up until the 2020s, Mandarin was generally seen as a way to maintain a link to Chinese culture.

=== Other Chinese varieties ===
Other Chinese varieties also have a presence in Singapore. Amongst them, Hokkien used to be an unofficial language of business until the 1980s. Hokkien was also used as a lingua franca among Chinese Singaporeans, and also among Malays and Indians to communicate with the Chinese majority. As of 2012, according to demographic figures, the five main Chinese linguistic groups in Singapore are Hokkien (41.1%), Teochew (21.0%), Cantonese (15.4%), Hakka (7.9%) and Hainanese (6.7%), while Hokchew/Hokchia (Fuzhou dialect), Henghua (Puxian Min), and Shanghainese have smaller speaker bases. Chinese varieties tend to mainly be spoken among the older generation. Since the 2020s, there has been renewed interest among Chinese Singaporeans in learning their ancestral Chinese languages as a cultural link, with Mandarin no longer viewed as such.

The two most commonly spoken Chinese languages other than Mandarin as of 2022 are Hokkien, which accounts for half of non-Mandarin Chinese speakers and Cantonese, spoken natively by 25% of other Chinese speakers. Cantonese has notably remained in a stronger state compared to other non-Mandarin Chinese varieties due to the popularity of media in the language, particularly Hong Kong cinema and television shows broadcast via cable television or online which are preferred by viewers over their Mandarin-dubbed versions on free-to-air television. This has also resulted in some non-native speakers understanding or learning the language. Teochew is being replaced by Hokkien, while other Chinese varieties are increasingly less commonly heard nowadays.

=== Written Chinese ===
Traditional Chinese characters were used in Singapore until 1969, when the Ministry of Education promulgated the Table of Simplified Characters (simplified Chinese: 简体字表; traditional Chinese: 簡體字表; pinyin: jiǎntǐzìbiǎo), which while similar to the Chinese Character Simplification Scheme of the People's Republic of China had 40 differences. In 1974 a new Table was published, and this second table was revised in 1976 to remove all differences between simplified Chinese characters in Singapore and China. Although simplified characters are currently used in official documents, the government does not officially discourage or prohibit the use of traditional characters. Hence, traditional characters are still used in signs, advertisements and Chinese calligraphy, while books in both character sets are available in Singapore.

== Malay ==
Malay is the national language of Singapore and one of its official languages. Its desgination as the national language plays a symbolic role, as Malays are constitutionally recognised as the indigenous peoples of Singapore, and it is the government's duty to protect their language and heritage. (Note: "The national language shall be the Malay language and shall be in the Roman script …" (Constitution of the Republic of Singapore, PART XIII).) This is also largely due to Singapore's geographical location in the Malay Archipelago.

Malay is written using a version of the Roman script known as Rumi. It is the home language of 13% of the Singaporean population. Malay is also the ceremonial national language and used in the national anthem of Singapore, in citations for Singapore orders and decorations and military foot drill commands, mottos of several organisations, and is the variety taught in Singapore's language education system. Linguistically, the vernacular Malay dialect of Singapore is similar to or even derived from that of Johore, but with a possible Javanese substrate "much influenced by its proximity to Java", as well as having a flap rhotic consonant (/ɾ/).

Historically Malay was written in the Jawi script, based on Arabic. Under the British and Dutch Malay began to be written in Rumi. Efforts to create a standardised spelling for Malaya and Singapore emerged in 1904 by colonial officer Richard Wilkinson. In 1910, the Malay of the Riau Islands was chosen by the Dutchman van Ophuijsen as the dialect for his book "Malay Grammar", intended for Dutch officials, standardising Rumi usage in Dutch territories. In 1933, grammarian Zainal Abidin bin Ahmad made further changes to Rumi as used in Malaya and Singapore. Many Chinese immigrants who spoke Malay were supporters of British rule, and purposely used Rumi when writing newspapers or translating Chinese literature. Printing presses used by colonial officials and Christian missionaries further spread Rumi, while Jawi was mostly written by hand. The transition to Rumi changed the Malay language due to the influence of English grammar. In 1972, Malaysia and Indonesia reached an agreement to standardise Rumi Malay spelling. Singaporean Malays still learn some Jawi as children alongside Rumi, and Jawi is considered an ethnic script for use on Singaporean Identity Cards.

Prior to independence, Singapore was a centre for Malay literature and Malay culture. However, after independence, this cultural role declined. Singapore is an observer to the Language Council for Brunei Darussalam-Indonesia-Malaysia which works to standardise Malay spelling, however it has not applied to be a member. It nonetheless applies standardisations agreed to in this forum, and follows the Malaysian standard when there are disagreements. Standards within the country are set by the Malay Language Council of Singapore. There are some differences between the official standard and colloquial usage. While the historical standard was the Johor-Riau dialect, a new standard known as sebutan baku (or bahasa Melayu baku) was adopted in 1956 by the Third Malay language and Literary Congress. This variation was chosen to create consistency between the written word and the spoken pronunciation. However, implementation was slow, with Malaysia only fully adopting it in the educational system in 1988, with Singapore introducing it at the primary school level in 1993. Despite expanding use in formal education, it has not replaced the Johor-Riau pronunciation for most speakers. The artificial creation of the accent means there are no truly native speakers, and the pronunciation is closer to Indonesian than it is to Johor-Riau. There has also been cultural resistance, with accent differences between older and younger generations leading to questions surrounding Malay cultural identity. This question was further sharpened by Malaysia dropping sebutan baku in 2000, returning to the traditional use of Johor-Riau.

While the official Mandarin and Tamil mother tongues often do not reflect the actual language spoken at home for many, Malay is often the language spoken at home in Singaporean Malay households. Due to this, and strong links between the language and cultural identity, the Singaporean Malay community has retained stronger usage of their mother tongue than others in the country. Nonetheless, there has been some shift towards English, with use of Malay as the primary language at home dropping from 92% to 83% between 2000 and 2010. This reflects a broader shift in Singapore, with English replacing Malay as the lingua franca throughout the late 20th century.

Other varieties that are still spoken in Singapore include Bazaar Malay (Melayu Pasar), a Malay-lexified pidgin, which was once an interethnic lingua franca when Singapore was under British rule. Another is Baba Malay, a variety of Malay Creole influenced by Hokkien and Bazaar Malay and the mother tongue of the Peranakans, which is still spoken today by approximately 10,000 Peranakans in Singapore. Other Austronesian languages, such as Javanese, Buginese, Minangkabau, Batak, Sundanese, Boyanese (which is a dialect of Madurese) and Banjarese, are also spoken in Singapore, but their use has declined. Orang Seletar, the language of the Orang Seletar, the first people of Singapore and closely related to Malay is also spoken near the Johor Strait, between Singapore and the state of Johor, Malaysia.

== Tamil ==
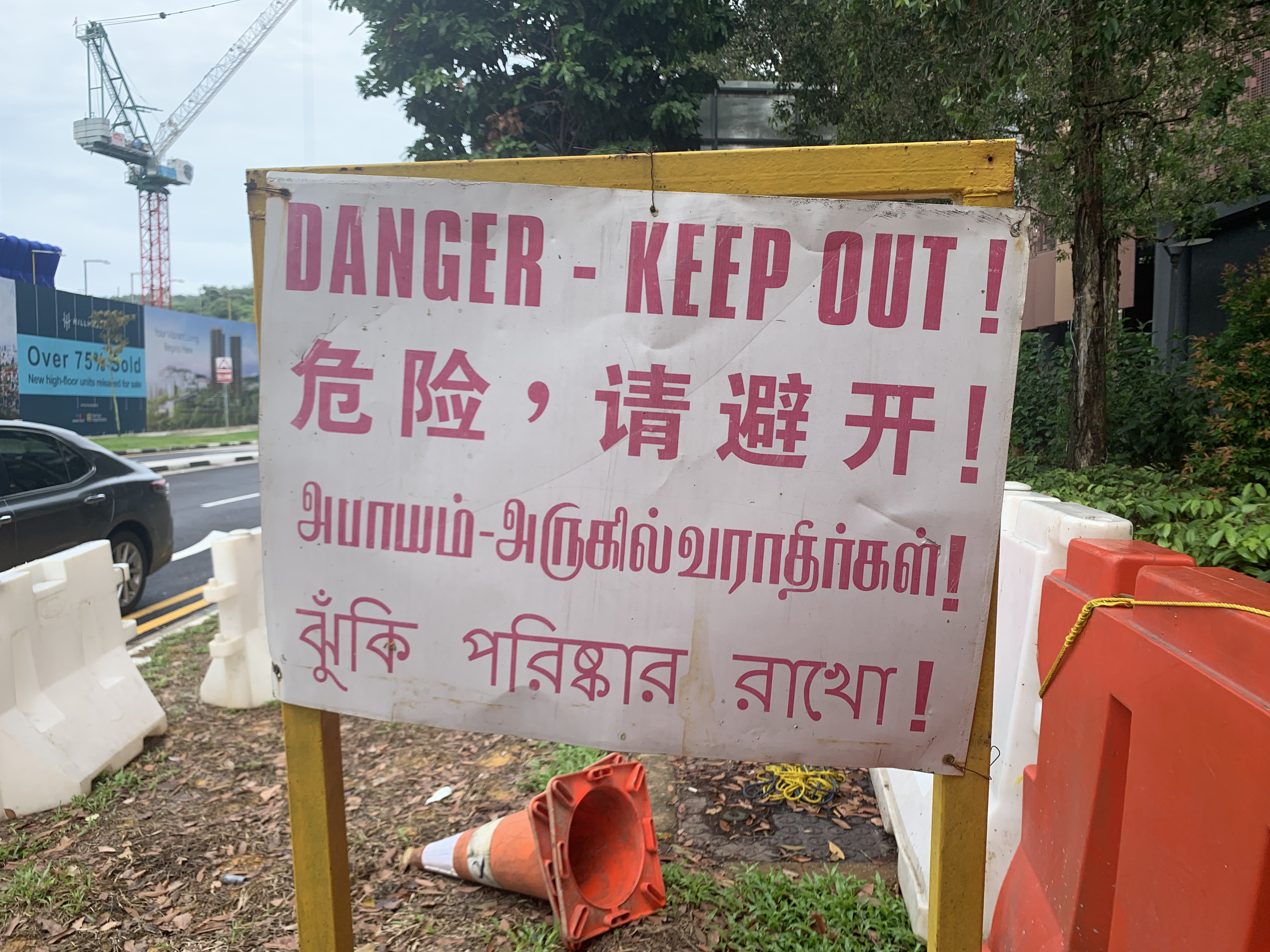
A "Danger-Keep Out" sign at a roadwork in Hillview showing English, Mandarin, Tamil, and Bengali

Tamil is one of the official languages of Singapore and written Tamil uses the Tamil script. It was chosen as an official language as it was spoken by the largest Indian ethnic group in Singapore, in addition to being "the language with the longest history of education in Malaysia and Singapore". According to the population census of 2010, 9.2% of the Singaporean population were of Indian origins, with approximately 36.7% who spoke Tamil most frequently as their home language. It is a drop from 2000, where Tamil-speaking homes comprised 42.9%. On the other hand, the percentage of Indian Singaporeans speaking languages categorised under "others" have increased from 9.7% in 2005 to 13.8% in 2010. Meanwhile, the percentage of the total population speaking Tamil at home has remained steady, or has even slightly risen over the years, to just above 4%, due to immigration from India and Sri Lanka.

There are a few reasons that contribute to Tamil's declining usage. Historically, Tamil immigrants came from different communities, such as Indian Tamils and Sri Lankan Tamils which spoke very different dialects, dividing the potential community of Tamil speakers. The housing policy of Singapore, with ethnic quotas that reflect national demographics, has prevented the formation of large Tamil communities. The Tamil taught in education is a deliberately pure form, that does not reflect and therefore does not reinforce Tamil as it is used in everyday life. Tamil is usually replaced by English, which is seen as providing children with greater opportunities in Singapore and abroad. The top-down Tamil language purism as dictated by the Ministry of Education Curriculum Planning and Development Division restricts language development, disallowing loanwords. However, the language policy is supported by Tamils, likely due to contrast with that of neighbouring Malaysia where Tamil has no status.

Tamil names are commonly used in countries like India, Sri Lanka, and Singapore. In these countries, Tamil people preserve their heritage and culture through their names.

Apart from Tamil, some of the other Indian languages spoken by minorities in Singapore include Malayalam, Telugu, Punjabi, Bengali, Hindi, and Gujarati.

== Eurasian languages ==
Kristang is a creole spoken by Portuguese Eurasians in Singapore and Malaysia. It developed when Portuguese colonisers incorporated borrowings from Malay, Chinese, Indian and Arab languages. When the British took over Singapore, Kristang declined as the Portuguese Eurasians learned English instead. As of 2006, it is largely spoken by the elderly.

== Singapore Sign Language ==
While Singapore Sign Language (SgSL) has not been recognised as a national sign language, the local deaf community recognises it as Singapore's native sign language, developed over six decades since the setting up of the first school for local deaf in 1954. Singapore Sign Language is closely related to American Sign Language and is influenced by Shanghainese Sign Language (SSL), Signing Exact English (SEE-II), Pidgin Signed English (PSE).

== Other Malayo-Polynesian languages ==
In the 1824 census of Singapore, 18% of the population were identified as ethnic Bugis, speaking the Buginese language, counted separately from the Malays. Over the centuries, the Bugis community dwindled and became assimilated into the Malay demographic. In 1990, only 0.4% of Singaporeans were identified as Bugis. Today the term Malay is used in Singapore as an umbrella term for all peoples of the Malay Archipelago.

== Bilingualism and multilingualism ==
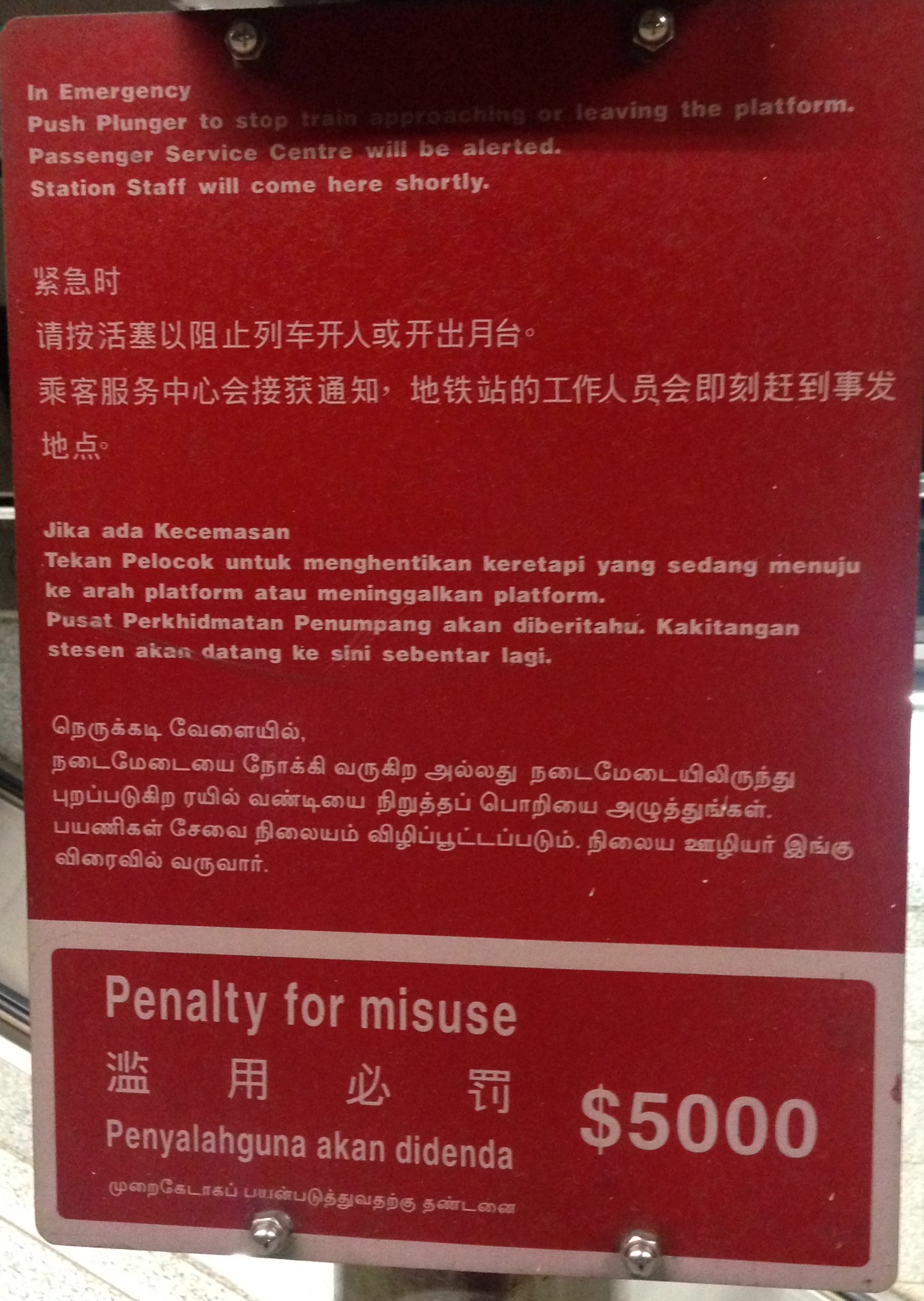
A warning sign in the four official languages of Singapore that is found in all Mass Rapid Transit (MRT) stations

The majority of Singaporeans are bilingual in English and one of the other three official languages. For instance, most Chinese Singaporeans can speak English and Mandarin. Some, especially the older generations, can speak Malay and additional Chinese varieties such as Hokkien, Teochew, Cantonese, Hakka, and Hainanese.

=== Bilingual education policy ===
Singapore has a bilingual education policy, where all students in government schools are taught English as their first language. Students in Primary and Secondary schools also learn a second language called their "Mother Tongue" by the Ministry of Education, where they are either taught Mandarin, Malay, or Tamil. English is the main language of instruction for most subjects, while Mother Tongue is used in Mother Tongue lessons and moral education classes. This is because Singapore's "bilingualism" policy of teaching and learning English and Mother Tongue in primary and secondary schools is viewed as a "cultural ballast" to safeguard Asian cultural identities and values against Western influence.

While "Mother Tongue" generally refers to the first language (L1) elsewhere, it is used to denote the "ethnic language" or the second language (L2) in Singapore. Prior to 1 January 2011, the Ministry of Education (MOE) in Singapore defined "Mother Tongue" not as the home language or the first language acquired by the student but by their father's ethnicity. For example, a child born to a Tamil-speaking Indian father and Hokkien-speaking Chinese mother would automatically be assigned to take Tamil as the Mother Tongue language.

Since 1 January 2011, Mother Tongue is defined solely by a person's official registered race. If a person is of more than one ethnicity and their race is registered in the hyphenated format, the race chosen will be the one that precedes the hyphen in their registered race.

The Lee Kuan Yew Fund for Bilingualism was set up on 28 November 2011. The fund aims to promote bilingualism amongst young children in Singapore, is set up to supplement existing English and Mother Tongue language programmes in teaching and language learning. It is managed by a board chaired by the Singapore's Minister of Education, Heng Swee Keat and advised by an international advisory panel of experts.

=== Impacts of bilingual education policy ===
The impact of the bilingual policy differs amongst students from the various ethnic groups. For the Chinese, when the policy was first implemented, many students found themselves struggling with two foreign languages: English and Mandarin. Even though several different Chinese varieties were widely spoken at home, they were excluded from the classroom as it was felt that they would be an "impediment to learning Chinese". Today, although Mandarin is widely spoken, proficiency in second languages has declined. In response to these falling standards, several revisions have been made to the education system. These include the introduction of the Mother Tongue "B" syllabus and the now-defunct EM3 stream, in both of which Mother Tongue is taught at a level lower than the mainstream standard. In the case of Mandarin, Chinese students would study Chinese "B".

The Malay-speaking community also faced similar problems after the implementation of the policy. In Singapore, Malay, not its non-standard dialects, is valued as a means of transmitting familial and religious values. For instance, "Madrasahs", or religious schools, mosques and religious classes all employ the Malay language. However, Malay in turn is facing competition from the increased popularity of English.

In contrast to the language policy for Mandarin and Malay, Indian students are given a wider variety of Indian languages to choose from. For example, Indian students speaking Dravidian languages study Tamil as a Mother Tongue. However, schools with low numbers of Tamil students might not provide Tamil language classes. As a result, students from such schools will attend Tamil language classes at the Umar Pulavar Tamil Language Centre (UPTLC). On the other hand, Indian students who speak non-Dravidian languages can choose from Hindi, Bengali, Punjabi, Gujarati and Urdu. However, as with Tamil, only certain schools offer these non-Dravidian languages. Thus, students will attend their respective language classes at designated language centres, held by the Board for the Teaching and Testing of South Asian Languages (BTTSAL).

In 2007, in a bid to enhance the linguistic experience of students, the Ministry of Education strongly encouraged schools to offer Conversational Malay and Chinese to those who do not take either of these languages as their Mother Tongue. By providing the schools with the resources needed to implement the programme, the Ministry of Education has succeeded in significantly increasing the number of participating schools. More importantly, the programme was also well received by students.

=== Challenges in the teaching of Mother Tongue ===
The teaching of Mother Tongue (especially Mandarin) in schools has encountered challenges due to more Singaporeans speaking and using English at home. The declining standards and command of Mandarin amongst younger generations of Chinese Singaporeans continue to be of concern to the older generations of Chinese Singaporeans, as they perceive it to be an erosion of Chinese culture and heritage. This concern has led to the establishment of the Singapore Centre for Chinese Language (SCCL) by the government in November 2009. The SCCL's stated purpose is to enhance the effectiveness of teaching Mandarin as a second language in a bilingual environment as well as to meet the learning needs of students from non-Mandarin speaking homes.

Despite government efforts to promote Mandarin through the Speak Mandarin Campaign, the propagation of Mandarin and Chinese culture amongst Chinese Singaporeans continues to be a challenge because Mandarin faces stiff competition from the strong presence of English. However, this situation is not only limited to Mandarin, but also Malay and Tamil, where rising statistics show that English is progressively taking over as the home language of Singaporeans.

=== Foreign population in Singapore ===
With the influx of foreigners, the population of non-English speaking foreigners in Singapore offers new challenges to the concept of language proficiency in the country. Foreigners in Singapore constitute 36% of the population and they dominate 50% of Singapore's service sectors. Thus, it is not uncommon to encounter service staff who are not fluent in English, especially those who do not use English regularly. In response to this situation, the Straits Times reported that from July 2010, foreigners working in service sectors would have to pass an English test before they can obtain their work permits.

== Sociolinguistic issues ==
=== Politics ===
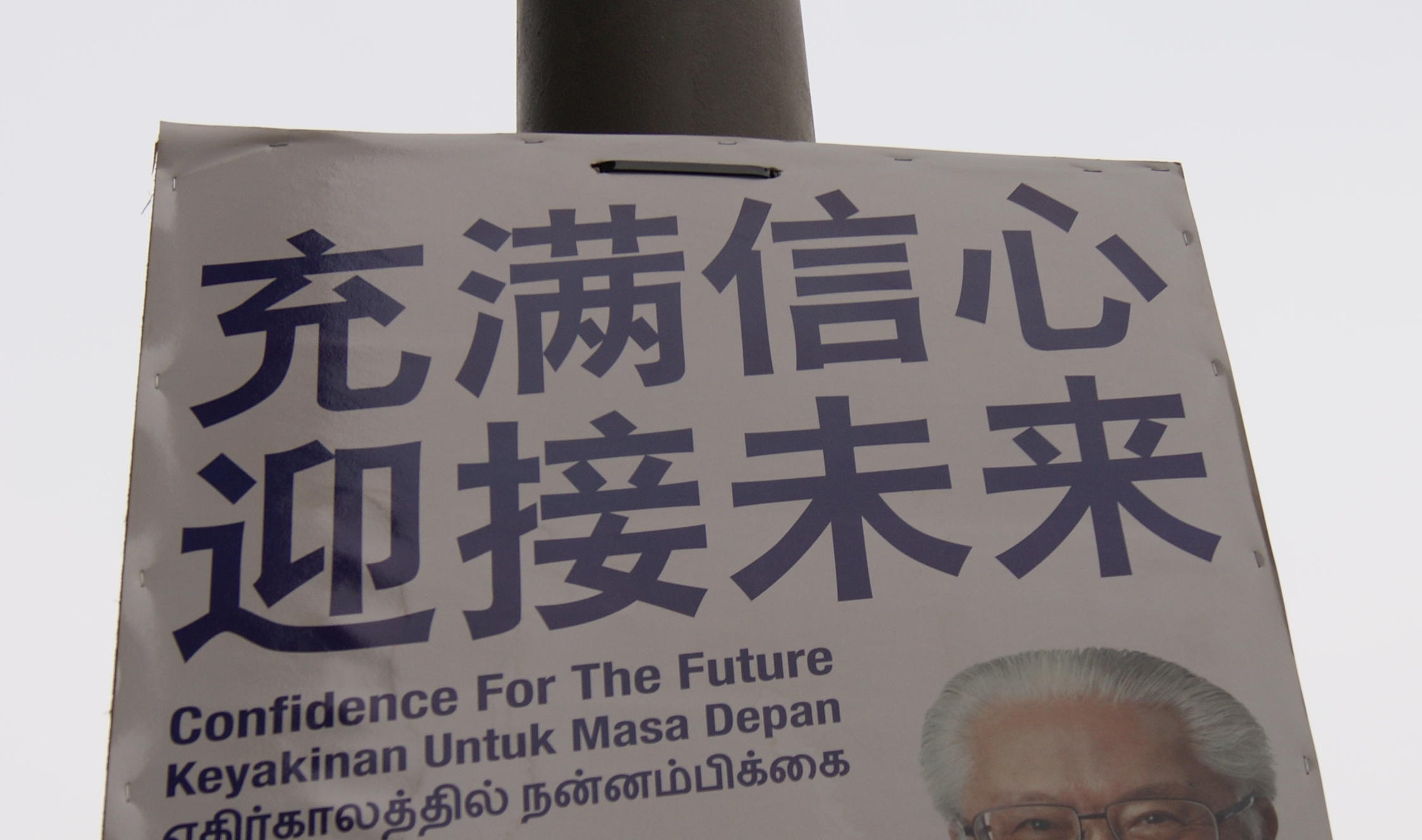
A multiligual campaign poster (in Chinese, English, Malay, and Tamil) for Tony Tan Keng Yam, a politician of Chinese descent, during 2011 Singaporean presidential election

Language plays an important role in Singapore's politics. Even until today, it is important for politicians in Singapore to be able to speak fluent English along with their Mother Tongue (including different varieties of Chinese) in order to reach out to the multilingual community in Singapore. This is evident in Prime Minister Lee Hsien Loong's annual National Day Rally speech, which is communicated through the use of English, Malay and Mandarin.

Before the 1980s, it was common for politicians to broadcast their speech in Malay, English, Singaporean Hokkien, Singaporean Mandarin and other Chinese varieties. For instance, during the 1960s, Lee Kuan Yew learned and used Hokkien frequently in his political or rally speeches, as it was vital for him to secure votes in elections from the Hokkien-speaking community. Similarly, Lim Chin Siong, who was charismatic in the use of Hokkien, was able to secure opposition votes. Facing competition and difficulty in securing votes from the Chinese-educated, Lee Kuan Yew also had to learn Mandarin, in order to win the votes from the Mandarin-speaking community.

Although the use of other Chinese varieties among the Singaporean population has dwindled, they continue to be used in election rallies as of the 2011 parliamentary election. For instance, both Low Thia Khiang and Chan Chun Sing were noted for their usage of different Chinese varieties during election rallies.

=== Status of Singlish as an identity marker ===
There has been a continuous debate between the general Singaporean population and the government with regard to the status of Singlish in local domains. While the government fears that the prevalence of Singlish would affect Singapore's overall image as a world class financial and business hub, most Singaporeans on the other hand have chosen to embrace Singlish as an identity marker and as a language of solidarity. In an attempt to eradicate the usage of Singlish, the government then began the Speak Good English Movement, encouraging people to use Standard Singaporean English in all contexts instead. Despite the success of the campaign, most Singaporeans surveyed still preferred the use of Singlish to communicate with fellow Singaporeans, and they also believed that they had the ability to code switch between Singlish and Standard Singaporean English, depending on the requirements of the particular situation.

Most recently, Singlish came into the limelight when Republic of Singapore Air Force pilots supposedly used the language to much effect to prevent their American counterparts from intercepting their communications during the 2014 Red Flag exercise, resulting in a boost in support for the usefulness of Singlish among Singaporean netizens.

=== Preservation issues ===
Chinese varieties (classified as dialects by the Singapore government), with the exception of Mandarin, have been in steep decline since the independence of Singapore in 1965. This is in part due to the launch of the Speak Mandarin Campaign in 1979, which promoted Mandarin as the language of the Singaporean Chinese community over other Chinese varieties. Under the campaign, television and radio programmes directed at Singaporean Chinese audiences in the Chinese varieties were removed and replaced with Mandarin programming. Speeches in Hokkien by then-Prime Minister Lee Kuan Yew were also discontinued to further support the campaign's goals. Since the late 1980s, the significance of Mandarin has mostly eclipsed other Chinese varieties amongst the Singaporean Chinese, though English has ultimately emerged as the preferred language for communication.

The preservation of local Chinese varieties in Singapore has been of increasing concern in Singapore since the 2000s, especially among the younger Singaporean Chinese. This sudden revival of other varieties can mainly be attributed to a feeling of disconnection between the younger and the elder generations, as well as a sense of loss of identity from their own linguistic roots. Active efforts have been undertaken to promote the languages and cultures of Chinese communities in Singapore, such as the 2014 Singapore Teochew Festival held by the Teochew Poit Ip Huay Kuan. A recent uptake in beginner language classes have also indicated a renewed interest in the revival and preservation of these languages.

=== Controversy over learning of Chinese varieties ===
In March 2009, a newspaper article was published in Singapore broadsheet daily The Straits Times on a Language and Diversity Symposium organised by the Division of Linguistics and Multilingual Studies at Nanyang Technological University. Ng Bee Chin, acting Head of the Division, was quoted in the article as saying, "Although Singaporeans are still multilingual, 40 years ago, we were even more multilingual. Young children are not speaking some of these languages at all any more. All it takes is one generation for a language to die."

The call to rethink the ban on non-Mandarin Chinese varieties elicited a swift reply from Minister Mentor, Lee Kuan Yew. "I thought it was a daft call. My then-principal private secretary Chee Hong Tat issued a reply on my behalf: Using one language more frequently means less time for other languages. Hence, the more languages a person learns, the greater the difficulties of retaining them at a high level of fluency… It would be stupid for any Singapore agency or NTU to advocate the learning of dialects, which must be at the expense of English and Mandarin."

A week later, Lee reiterated the point at the 30th anniversary launch of the Speak Mandarin Campaign. In his speech, he described his personal experience with "language loss".

"To keep a language alive, you have to speak and read it frequently. The more you use one language, the less you use other languages. So the more languages you learn, the greater the difficulties of retaining them at a high level of fluency. I have learned and used six languages – English, Malay, Latin, Japanese, Mandarin and Hokkien. English is my master language. My Hokkien has gone rusty, my Mandarin has improved. I have lost my Japanese and Latin, and can no longer make fluent speeches in Malay without preparation. This is called "language loss.""

=== Renewed interest in learning other Chinese varieties ===
Since 2000, there has been a renewed interest in other Chinese varieties among Singaporean Chinese. In 2002, clan associations such as Hainanese Association of Singapore (Kheng Chiu Hwee Kuan) and Teochew Poit Ip Huay Kuan started classes to teach other Chinese varieties. This was in response to an increased desire among Singaporeans to reconnect with their Chinese heritage and culture through learning other Chinese varieties. In 2007, a group of 140 students from Paya Lebar Methodist Girls' Primary School learnt Hokkien-Taiwanese and Cantonese as an effort to communicate better with the elderly. The elderly themselves taught the students the varieties. The programme was organised in the hope of bridging the generational gap that was formed due to the suppression of these varieties in Singapore.

Likewise, third-year students from Dunman High can now take a module called "Pop Song Culture". This module lets them learn about pop culture in different dialect groups through pop songs from the 70s and 80s performed in different varieties. Besides this, students can also take an elective on different flavours and food cultures from various dialect groups.

Although the Singaporean government no longer openly condemns or discourages the use of Chinese varieties, there is little institutional support for these languages to be taught in schools as electives. However, the Ministry of Communications and Information has allowed limited use of Chinese varieties via state-owned broadcaster Mediacorp's Channel 8 and Capital 95.8FM. A dedicated series of programmes in various Chinese varieties, such as How Are You? and Whatever Will Be, Will Be, have also been produced and made widely available via online platforms to connect with older members of the Singaporean Chinese community.

In June 2026, sleeper hit, Chinese family drama film, Dear You, was released in Singapore in Mandarin. It was met with disappointment from the local Teochew community in Singapore, as it would result in the loss of cultural nuance and quicken the decline of Teochew in Singapore. Nick Huang, a linguist from the National University of Singapore, said that it was a "missed opportunity" to allow for appreciation of the differences in the Chinese Singaporean community. In response, the Infocomm Media Development Authority allowed subsequent festivals and "niche events" to screen the film in Teochew, after eight Teochew screenings in Golden Village sold all 4,800 tickets within two hours. Jeremy Siow, a political scientist, says that the government had loosened their regulations by the time the movie was released, but also said that the campaign was outdated as "dialects" did not threaten Mandarin, but English did. Darlene Machell Espena, an associate professor of Southeast Asian studies in the Singapore Management University, said that the few Teochew screenings were a good omen, reflecting the changing attitude of the government towards openness regarding non-Mandarin varieties of Chinese, but also said that more recognition must be given to these varieties of Chinese to preserve cultural diversity. Tan Jun Yi from The Straits Times wrote that it was "a great disservice to the movie" to only be available in Mandarin, and that the heritage is likely to disappear if preservation efforts continue to face challenges.

Some Singaporean viewers determined to travel to Johor Bahru, so that they could watch the show in Teochew. Eng Ting Ting, a Teochew Singaporean, talked about the parallels the movie made with her grandfather's migration to Singapore, and hoped that her children can watch the movie in Teochew. The Mandarin release of the film also reignited debate about Singapore's language policies. Singaporean filmmakers, Eric Khoo and Jack Neo, wrote to The Straits Times, comparing screening a non-Mandarin Chinese film to a French or Malay film and should not be treated differently.

== Linguistic landscape of Singapore ==
The multi-ethnic background of Singapore's society can be seen in its linguistic landscape. While English dominates as the working language of Singapore, the city does not possess a monolingual linguistic landscape. This can be seen from the variety of signs strewn around the city. Signs are colour-coded and categorised by their respective functions: for example, signs pointing to attractions are brown with white words, while road signs and street names are green with white words. Some of the most evident signs of multilingualism in Singapore's linguistic landscape include danger/warning signs at construction sites, as well as road signs for tourist attractions. By observing the variation in languages used in the different contexts, it is possible to obtain information on the ethnolinguistic vitality of the country.

=== Tourist attractions ===
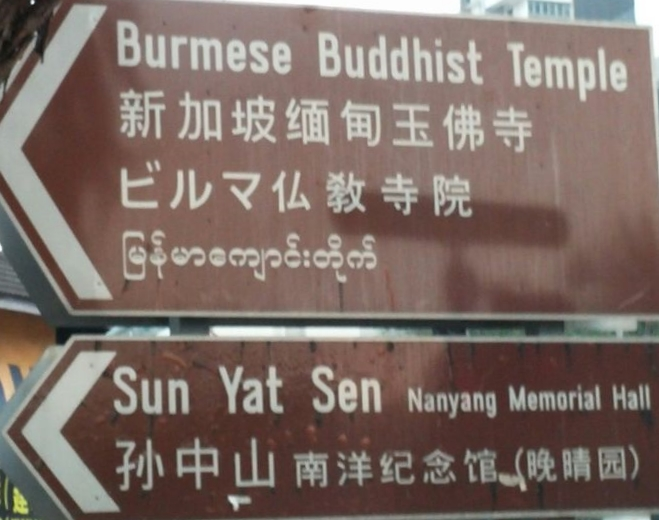
Road signs to the Burmese Buddhist Temple and the Sun Yat Sen Nanyang Memorial Hall. The non-English languages used on the signs appear to depend upon the expected visitors to each place (only English and Chinese for the Sun Yat Sen Nanyang Memorial Hall sign, but those two plus Japanese and Burmese for the Burmese Buddhist Temple sign).

The majority of Singapore's tourist attractions provide information through English in the Roman script. In many cases, the entrances of the attraction is written in English (usually with no other accompanying languages) while the distinctive brown road signs seen along streets and expressways which direct tourists come in up to four or five languages, with English as the largest and most prominent language on the sign.

Some examples of the different ways in which popular tourist attractions in Singapore display ethnolinguistic diversity can be seen at tourist attractions such as Lau Pa Sat, where the words "Lau Pa Sat" on the directory boards come from Hokkien, with lau for "old" (Chinese: 老; Pe̍h-ōe-jī: lāu), and pa sat for "market" (Chinese: 巴刹; Pe̍h-ōe-jī: pa-sat), written in roman script. The entrance sign of the attraction also includes a non-literal translation in English below its traditional name (Festival Market). It is also called the Telok Ayer Market, a name which makes reference to the location of the attraction and does not have anything to do with its cultural name.

The conversion and expression of Mandarin and Hokkien in Roman script helps non-Mandarin and non-Hokkien speakers with the pronunciation of the name of a place whilst remaining in tandem with the use of English and Roman script in Singapore. The repackaging of the original names of Lau Pa Sat in Roman script, and inclusion of the appearance of an English translation as a secondary title can be seen as a way of heightening the sense of authenticity and heritage of the attraction as it is marketed as a culturally-rich area in Singapore, similar to Chinatown and Little India; both of which were formerly cultural enclaves of the distinctive races. Similarly in places that bear cultural significance, the signs are printed in the language associated with the culture, such as The Sun Yat Sen Nanyang Memorial Hall which has an entirely Chinese sign without any translations.

Some notable exceptions include the brown directional road signs for the Merlion Park which are written not only in the four national languages, but also in Japanese. Although many variations exist, this arrangement is widely applied to most places of interest as well as places of worship, such as the Burmese Buddhist Temple which has signs in Burmese and some mosques in Singapore which also have their names printed in the Jawi script even though the Malay language was standardised with the Roman alphabet in Singapore.

=== Government offices and public buildings ===
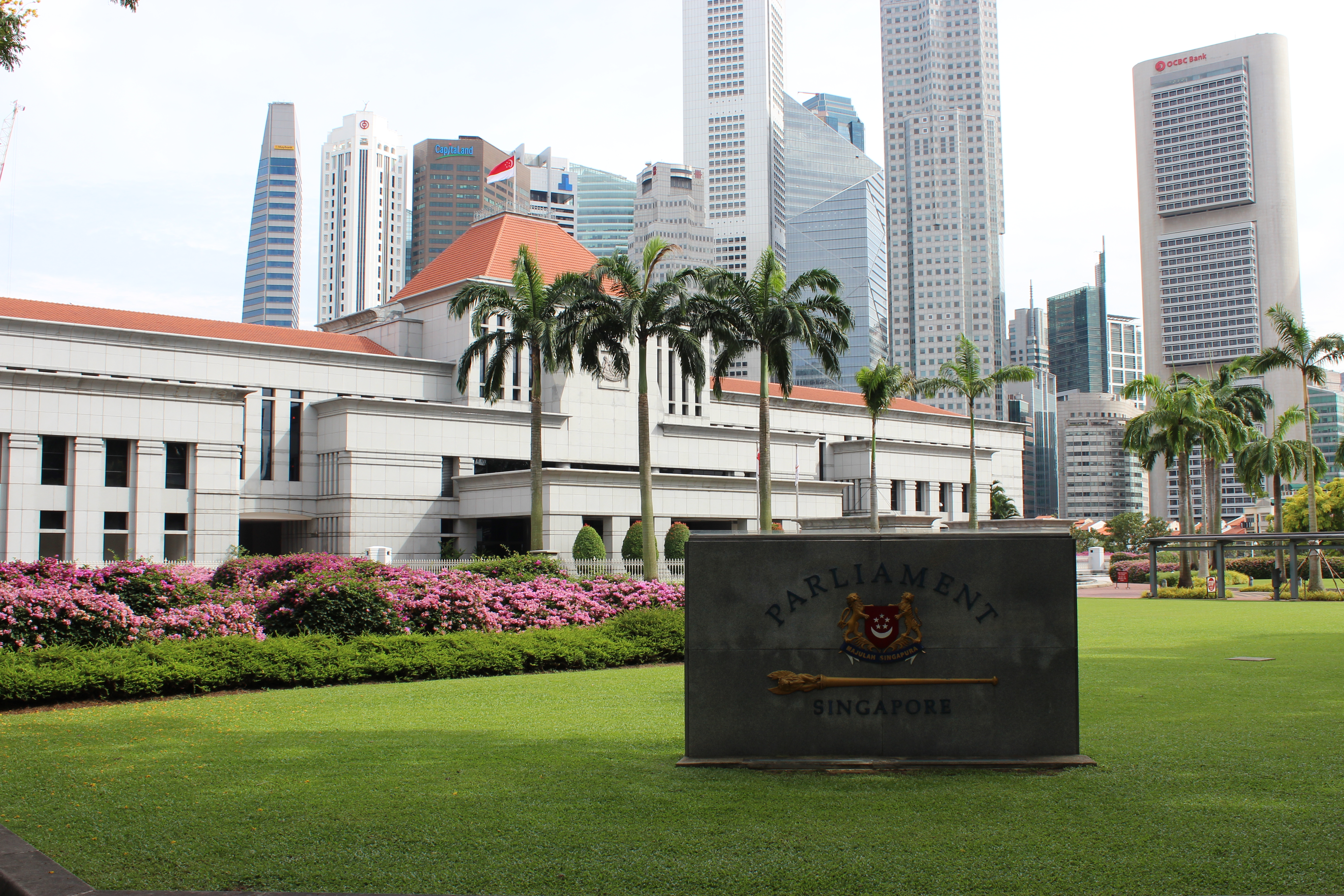
English signage at the Singapore Parliament

Despite the fact that Malay is the national language of Singapore, government buildings are often indicated by signs in English and not Malay. Comparing the relative occurrences of English and Malay in building signs, the use of the working language is far more common in Singapore's linguistic landscape than that of the national language, which is limited to ceremonial purposes. This can also be seen on the entrance sign to most Ministries and government buildings, which are expressed only in English, the working language.

Most of the foreign embassies in Singapore are able to use their own national or working languages as a representation of their respective embassies in Singapore, as long as their language can be expressed in the script of any of Singapore's official languages. For example, embassies representing non-English speaking countries such as the French Embassy are allowed to use their own languages because the language can be expressed in Roman script, thus explaining why the French embassy uses its French name. However, for the case of the Royal Thai Embassy, English was chosen to represent it in Singapore because the Thai script is not recognised as a script in any of Singapore's official languages, even though English is less widely used in Thailand than standard Thai.

=== Public hospitals ===
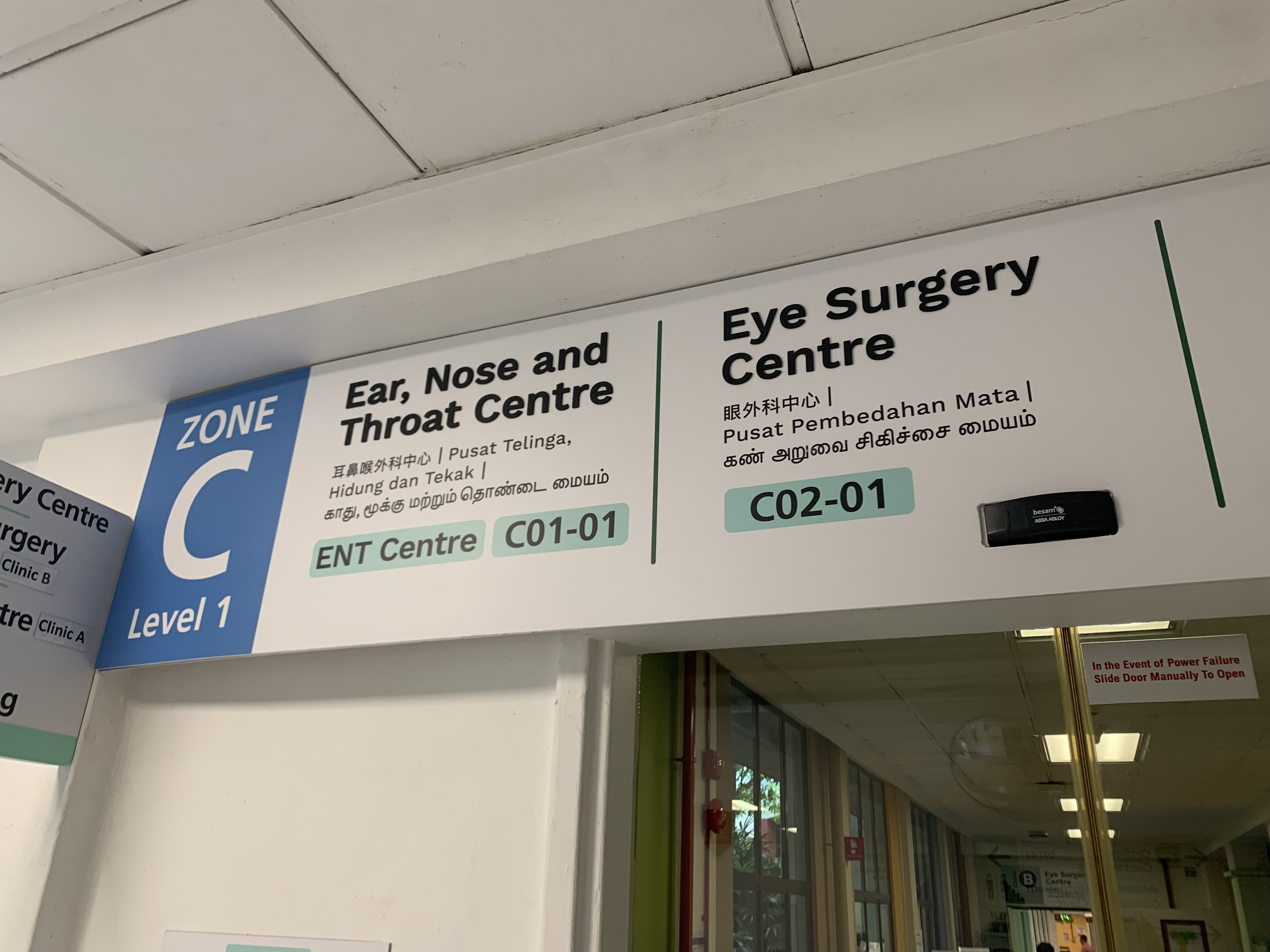
Clinic signages at Alexandra Hospital

Out of the eight general hospitals overseen by Singapore's Ministry of Health, only Singapore General Hospital has signages in the four official languages. Along Hospital Drive (where Singapore General Hospital is located) and various national medical centres, road directories are entirely in English. Within the hospital itself, signs for individual blocks, wards, Accident and Emergency department, Specialist Outpatient Clinics, National Heart Centre and National Cancer Centre have signs written in the four official languages. The English titles are still expressed with the largest font first, followed by Malay, Chinese and Tamil in smaller but equally-sized fonts, which is in accordance with order given by Singapore's constitution. Surprisingly, the Health Promotion Board, National Eye and Dental Centres, which are also in the same region, have English signs only. All of the other seven public hospitals have their "Accident and Emergency" sign in English only, with some highlighted in a red background.

=== Notices and campaigns ===
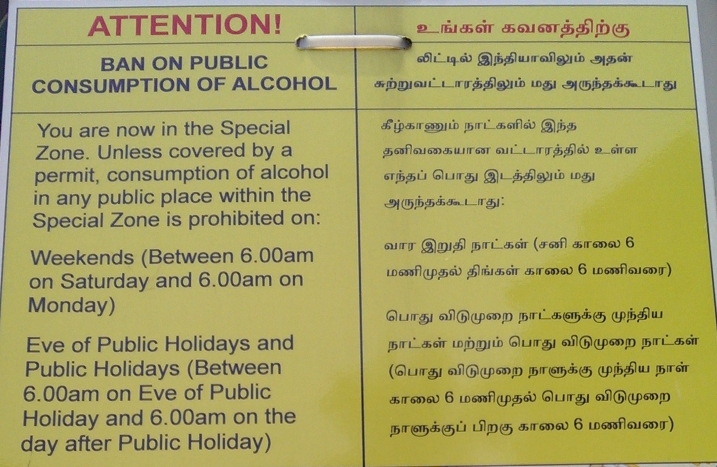
An advisory poster found in Little India with information regarding the sale of alcohol

Messages and campaigns that have a very specific target audience and purpose are usually printed in the language of intended readers. For example, the "No Alcohol" signs put up along Little India after the Little India Riots are notably printed in only Tamil and English as a reflection of the racial demographics in the region.

During the 2003 SARS epidemic, the government relied heavily on the media to emphasise the importance of personal hygiene, and also to educate the general public on the symptoms of SARS, in which a Singlish rap video featuring Gurmit Singh as Phua Chu Kang was used as the main medium. Similarly in 2014, the Pioneer Generation Package (for senior citizens above 65 years of age in 2014 who obtained Singapore citizenship on or before 31 December 1986) made use of Chinese varieties commonly spoken in Singapore such as Hokkien, Cantonese and Teochew, and also Singlish in order to make the policies more relatable, and at the same time raise awareness about the benefits that this new scheme provides for them. These allowances of different language varieties is an exception to the four official languages. This exception is seen for campaigns that are deemed as highly important, and include the elderly, or those who are not as proficient in the English language as the target audience.

=== Limitations in current research methodologies ===
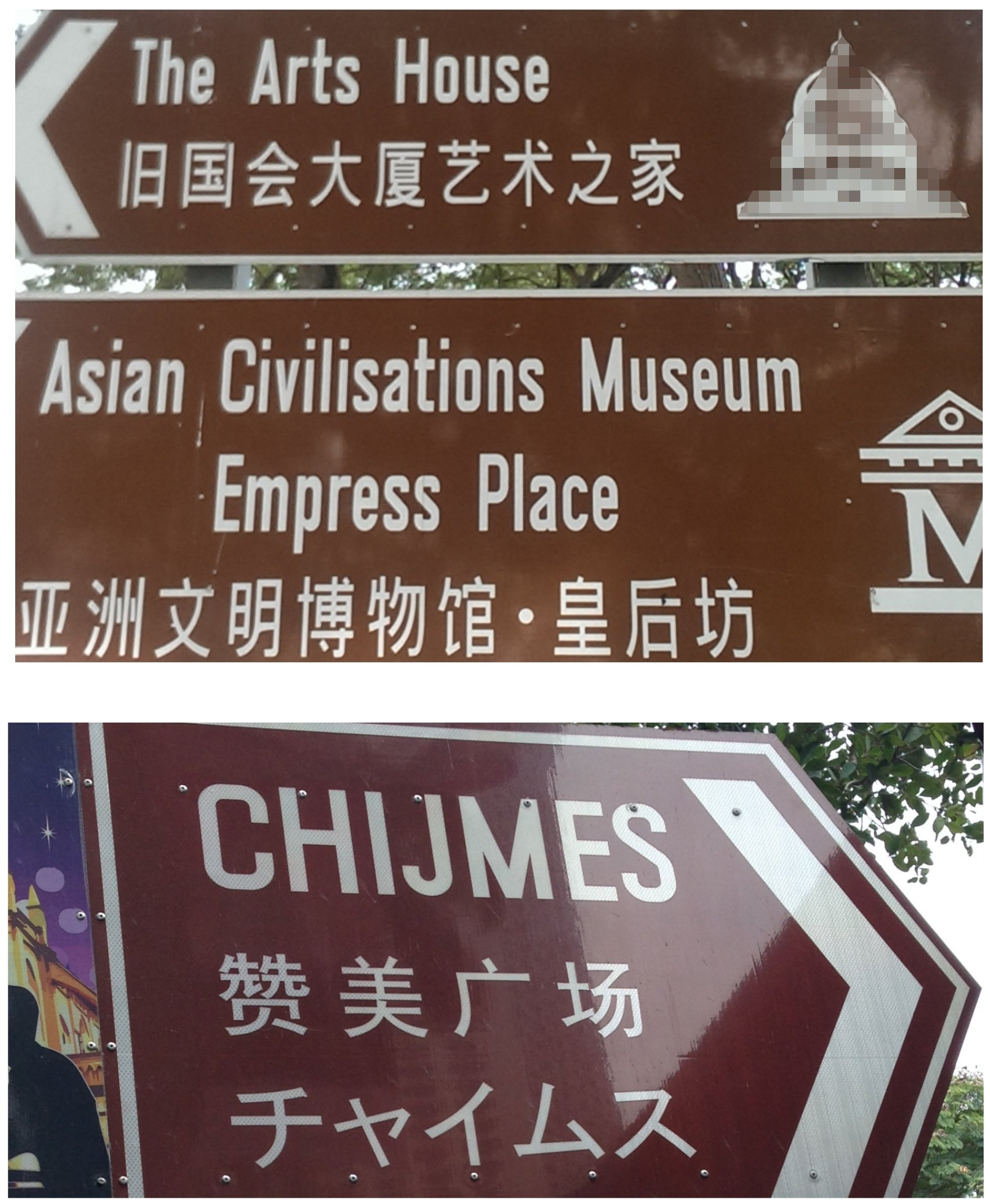
Different non-English languages appearing on directional road signs in Singapore

While the above examples show how the different languages are used on signs within Singapore, there is scant data on the motivations behind these variations seen, as exemplified by the advisory for "No Alcohol" sales in Little India, which showcased a rare variation from the usage of the four main languages that are commonly seen on most advisory signs. Similarly, the Ministry of Health, in a response to a feedback requesting all hospitals to have four languages on its entrances, has claimed that usage of pictorial signages was better in conveying messages, as opposed to using all four languages. Due to problems in the research methodology and lack of governmental statutes that explain these variations, the study on the linguistics landscape in Singapore remain as a controversial field. These problems include non-linearity, where the large numbers of variations seen in Singapore prevents the application of any trends to understand the landscape; and also the lack of any standard legislation that determines any fixed rules on usage of languages on signs.

=== Controversies ===
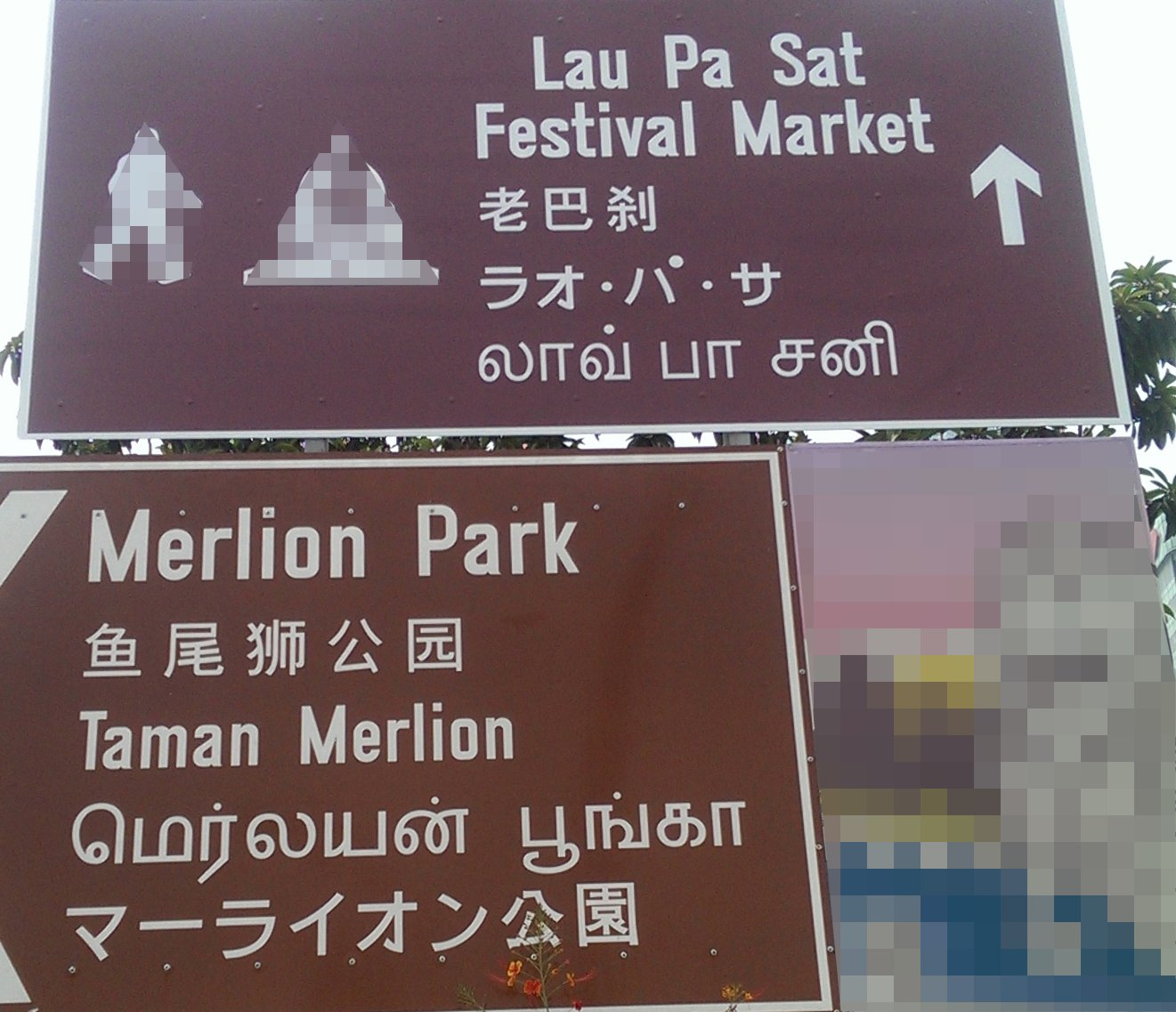
Lau Pa Sat sign with incorrect translations

In a 2012 pilot program, SMRT trains began announcements of station names in both English and Mandarin Chinese so as to help Mandarin Chinese-speaking senior citizens cope better with the sudden increase in new stations. However, this received mixed reactions from the public. Some people pointed out that there were senior citizens who did not speak Mandarin, while others complained of feeling alienated. In reaction to this, SMRT claimed that the announcements were only recorded in English and Mandarin because the Malay and Tamil names of stations sounded very similar to the English names.

In 2013, a group of Tamil speakers petitioned the Civil Aviation Authority of Singapore to include Tamil instead of Japanese on all the signs in the Singapore Changi Airport. Even though only 5% of Singapore's population speaks Tamil, they argued that since Tamil is one of the four official languages of Singapore, it should be used to reflect Singapore's multi-racial background.

In 2014, there were reports of erroneous translations on road signs of popular tourist attractions such as Lau Pa Sat and Gardens by the Bay made by the Singapore Tourism Board.

== Media and the arts ==
The free-to-air channels in Singapore are run by Mediacorp and each channel is aired in one of the four official languages of Singapore. For example, Channel U and Channel 8 are Mandarin-medium channels, Channel 5 and CNA are English-medium channels, Suria is a Malay-medium channel, and Vasantham is a predominantly Tamil-medium channel. However, these channels might also feature programmes in other languages. For example, apart from programmes in Mandarin, Channel U also broadcasts Korean television programmes at specific allotted times.

=== Chinese varieties in local films ===
The use of non-Mandarin varieties of Chinese in Singapore media (free-to-air public television and radio broadcasts mainly by state-owned Mediacorp, along with the PAP-affiliated SPH Media), is heavily restricted by the Ministry of Digital Development and Information (MDDI). The rationale given for the resistance towards non-Mandarin varieties of Chinese, was that their presence would hinder language learning of English and Mandarin. As such, non-Mandarin movies (namely popular Cantonese or Hokkien comedies, dramas or movies, from Hong Kong or Taiwan respectively) are translated and dubbed into Mandarin Chinese. However, in order to cater to older Singaporeans who only speak non-Mandarin varieties of Chinese, videos, VCDs, DVDs, paid subscription radio services, paid TV channels and paid online streaming services are exempted from MDDI's restrictions. Two free-to-air channels, Channel 8 and Channel U, are also allowed to show operas and arthouse movies with some non-standard variety content, respectively.

The use of Chinese varieties is not as tightly controlled in traditional arts, such as Chinese opera. As such, they have managed to survive, and even flourish in these areas. In Singapore, various types of Chinese opera include Hokkien, Teochew, Hainanese and Cantonese. In the past, this diversity encouraged the translation between varieties for scripts of popular stories. After the implementation of the bilingual policy and Speak Mandarin Campaign, Mandarin subtitles were introduced to help the audience understand the performances. Today, as usage of English rises, some opera troupes not only provide English subtitles but also English translations of their works. For these English-Chinese operas, subtitles may be provided in either Mandarin, other Chinese varieties, or both. In this way, Chinese opera will be able to reach out to a wider audience despite being variety-specific.

Similar to Chinese opera, there are no language restrictions on entries for film festivals. In recent years, more local film makers have incorporated non-standard Chinese varieties into their films. For example, the local movie 881 revived the popularity of getai after it was released. Getai, which is mainly conducted in Hokkien and Teochew, became more popular with the younger generations since the release of the movie. On the effect triggered by the release of the movie 881, Professor Chua Beng Huat, Head of the Department of Sociology of the National University of Singapore, commented in the Straits Times that "putting Hokkien on the silver screen gives Hokkien a kind of rebellious effect. It's like the return of the repressed." The success of 881 is also reflected by album sales of 881 movie soundtrack, which became the first local film soundtrack to hit platinum in Singapore. In other instances, the movie Singapore Ga Ga, a tissue seller sings a Hokkien song while Perth features a Singaporean taxi driver using Hokkien and Cantonese. Local directors have commented that non-standard Chinese varieties are vital as there are some expressions which just cannot be put across in Mandarin Chinese, and that the different Chinese varieties are an important part of Singapore that adds a sense of authenticity that locals will enjoy.

=== Indian languages in the media ===
Indian languages besides Tamil are managed slightly differently from the Chinese varieties. Even though only Tamil has official language status, there have been no attempts to discourage the use of other Indian languages such as Bengali, Gujarati, Hindi, Malayalam, Punjabi, Telugu, and Urdu. For one, movies in these languages are shown in some local cinemas, such as Rex and Screens of Bombay Talkies. Furthermore, the local Indian TV channel Vasantham has also allocated specific programme timeslots to cater to the variety of Indian language speakers in Singapore.

=== Language-specific societies ===
Chinese clan associations play a role in maintaining the non-standard Chinese varieties. In the past, they provided support to migrant Chinese, based on the province they originated. Today, they provide a place for people who speak the same variety to gather and interact. For example, the Hokkien Huay Kuan holds classes for performing arts, calligraphy, and Hokkien Chinese. They also organise the biennial Hokkien Festival, which aims to promote Hokkien customs and culture. With such efforts, perhaps non-standard Chinese varieties in Singapore will be better equipped to resist erosion.

Apart from the efforts to maintain local Chinese varieties, the Eurasian Association holds Kristang classes for people who are interested in learning Kristang. In this way, it hopes to preserve what it perceives to be a unique part of the Eurasian heritage in Singapore.
