= Speak Good English Movement =

Campaign in Singapore to promote Standard English over Singlish

A poster for the Speak Good English Movement, captured in 2010

The Speak Good English Movement (SGEM) is a campaign by the Government of Singapore, launched by then-Prime Minister Goh Chok Tong on 29 April 2000, to standardise Singapore English. It is seen as a measure to counter the usage of Singlish, the vernacular dialect of the country.

== Background ==
English was introduced in 1819 with the establishment of the modern port in Singapore. The port attracted migrants from neighbouring countries, such as China and India, resulting in a diverse linguistic landscape. Proximity to these languages has over generations influenced Singaporean English. Known colloquially as Singlish, the vernacular dialect is characterised by the mixture of local expressions with Standard English (e.g. the use of discourse particles such as lah). Singlish is commonly used by Singaporeans in informal contexts and can be incomprehensible to non-Singaporeans.

When the Speak Good English Movement was launched in 1999, then-Prime Minister Goh Chok Tong described Singlish as "English corrupted by Singaporeans", and "broken, ungrammatical English". According to the government, mastery of Standard English is imperative to raise living standards in Singapore, and Singlish causes problems when Singaporeans need to communicate in the "global language of commerce, business and technology". The movement thus campaigns for an improved standard of English used in Singapore. In hopes of extending its reach, the movement adopts a different theme and target group each year, and also collaborates with various partner organisations to provide programmes in line with the movement's goals.

== Aims ==
The campaign aims to discourage the use of Singlish and encourage the use of a more standardised form of English, (i.e. generally modelled on the British standard). According to the movement's chairman, then Colonel (NS) David Wong, the Speak Good English Movement aims to build a sense of pride that Singaporeans can speak good English, as opposed to Singlish, as well as to check the trend where Singaporeans use Singlish as a way of identifying themselves. Instead, it envisions a brand of grammatically correct English, different from Singlish, to be linked with the unique Singaporean identity.

== Past themes ==
Since 2003, the Speak Good English Movement has been launched annually with year-long programmes and activities held island-wide to increase the awareness among Singaporeans that speaking good English matters in their daily lives. Each year a different theme focusing on the target audience is created. The themes that were used in the campaign up until 2015 are:

- 2000–2004: Speak Well. Be Understood.
- 2005–06: Speak Up. Speak Out. Speak Well.
- 2006–07: Be Understood. Not only in Singapore, Malaysia and Batam.
- 2007–08: Rock Your World! Express Yourself.
- 2008–09: I Can
- 2009–10: Impress. Inspire. Intoxicate.
- 2010–11: Get It Right
- 2011–12: How You Speak Makes a Difference
- 2012–13: Make Good English Stick
- 2013–14: 10 Tips to Improve Your English
- 2014-16: Grammar Rules Matter. Use Good English.
- 2017–18: Learn Grammar Rules to Rule the English Language
- 2019: Let's Connect. Let's Speak Good English.

=== 2000–2004 : Speak Well. Be Understood. ===
In 1999, then Prime Minister Goh Chok Tong highlighted the problem of speaking Singlish in his National Day Rally. A year later in April 2000, he officially launched the Speak Good English Movement with the tagline 'Speak Well, Be Understood'. He stressed the importance of speaking standard English and reducing the use of Singlish, as Singapore is a hub city and an open economy with a need to interact with English-speaking foreigners. Singaporeans often use Chinese syntax and literal translations of Chinese phrases while speaking English, which make utterances seem truncated and incomprehensible to foreigners. In his rally, the prime minister stressed that "if we speak a corrupted form of English that is not understood by others, we will lose a key competitive advantage." The movement was spearheaded by a committee of people in the private sector led by then Colonel (NS) David Wong, a senior adviser with the consulting company Ernst and Young. Its target audience was Singaporeans under 40, which included young working adults, parents and students in schools, tertiary institutes, polytechnics and technical institutes. The launch kick-started a week-long festival packed with events such as plays and a speech marathon.

Later in the year, the public sector also organised year-long programmes as part of the movement. One such event was the seminar held by the Singapore Teachers' Union (STU) at the Shangri-La Hotel, attended by about 500 participants who were mostly teachers. The seminar emphasised the power of pronunciation and the teaching of grammar, and encouraged teachers to teach English in more creative ways in schools using dramas and role-playing. Other highlights in 2000 included the launch of Grammar Matters, a series of five books using comics to illustrate the correct use of grammar by the Regional English Language Centre in support of the movement.

From 2001 to 2002, it was reported that increasingly, Singaporeans were becoming more aware and acknowledging the importance of speaking good English. The British Council continued to operate its toll-free line giving English lessons. Reportedly, year 2001 saw almost 250,000 callers while there were about 170,000 callers in 2002. Also, an inter-school Scrabble competition, in which 54 primary schools participated, was held to kick off the year's events in April 2002.

According to the Government, more Singaporeans recognised the need to speak well, and took steps to improve their spoken English. Programmes organised by SGEM partners such as the People's Association and the British Council were well received.

In 2003, the movement, already in its fourth year, aimed to not only encourage Singaporeans to speak well but also speak simple English. Chairman Wong said, "They may be afraid to use English; it's not natural to them. This year what we would like to do is encourage people to try. Have a go even if they can't speak well, even if they cannot use long words, even if they can't use long sentences; it's not important. The idea is to use simple words, simple sentences and convey their message clearly." The movement continued throughout the year until March 2004 so as to create greater impact and awareness.

In its fifth year, acting Manpower Minister Ng Eng Hen launched the campaign at The Arts House at Old Parliament in April 2004. The target of the campaign can be summed up as English@Work&Play. Its target audience was working adults in the service industry, including cabbies, shop assistants, waiters and others, which made up 70 per cent of all workers in Singapore. People in positions of influence, parents and teachers were also encouraged to serve as positive role models in speaking good English to those around them. The movement also partnered organisations and key agencies in training workshop initiatives to improve the English language proficiency of all their teachers. A new programme called Functional Literacy for Our Workers (FLOW) was initiated by the Workforce Development Agency with the aim to equip workers who had little English literacy with some basic tools required for them to do their work. Other activities to promote good English were also held throughout the year, such as the WISH programme (as in the previous year), and talks at selected public libraries to educate the public on the importance of reading aloud and on using English to communicate with one's family.

==== Partner programmes ====
- Mattel Southeast Asia held the Inter School Scrabble competition.
- Singapore Drama Educators Association (SDEA) held DRAMAzing race, which involved some 150 students from 29 secondary schools in a race that encouraged them to utilise good English. The race was similar in format to The Amazing Race.
- The National University of Singapore held PROSE (Promotion of Standard English) Forum where prominent figures in Singapore shared their experiences about the importance of speaking good English and being understood.
- National Library Board held the Raise-A-Reader Workshop: The Primary Years tailored specially to equip parents with the know-hows of choosing suitable reading materials for their children and complementing their reading habits. Other events such as ACTiquette! Dramatization Contest were also organized in conjunction of the SGEM 2003.
- English Language and Literature Teachers Association of Singapore, ELLTA (S) conducted a seminar on Speaking Good English for Effective Teaching and Communication.
- Julia Gabriel Speech & Drama Centre held a workshop for parents to develop language skills, encourage reading skills and motivate writing skills using books, stories and poems at home for their children.
- The British Council held workshops for parents to improve their pronunciation, to identify Singlish errors and replace them with the standard forms and held IELTS tests.
- Society for Reading & Literacy (SRL) conducted a six-month Women Learning English (WISH) Programme for free at 12 community centres nationwide with a record enrollment of 180 students in six classes. Also, Sheila Wee from the SRL conducted a talk to educate parents on the use of storytelling to develop children's interest in English.
- Workshops by SGEM partners: These included Reading Aloud: The Whys And Hows organised by Society for Reading & Literacy (SRL), Tell Me A Story and Fun With Tots by National Library Board that educated parents on how to develop reading skills in their children among others.
- Speak Good English Weekend held at The Arts House at Old Parliament saw the collaboration of SGEM partners like Asian Storytelling Network (ASN), British Council, Institute of Technical Education (ITE), Julia Gabriel Speech & Drama Centre, National Library Board, News Radio 93.8FM and Regional Language Centre (RELC) to organise activities related to English such as Scrabble, poetry, and tongue-twister sessions. Booths were set up to allow enrolment for English classes as well.

=== 2005–06 : Speak Up. Speak Out. Speak Well. ===
Prime Minister Lee Hsien Loong launched that year's Speak Good English Movement on 13 May at the HDB Hub Auditorium at Toa Payoh. Chairing the movement was Professor Koh Tai Ann, professor of English Literature at the School of Humanities and Social Sciences at Nanyang Technological University. Professor Koh highlighted that speaking good English did not necessarily mean that one should seek to eradicate or diminish the usage of Singlish or mother tongue. He recognised the importance of mother tongue and Singlish as a bonding element for Singaporeans, but emphasised that there was a right place and time for it and that Singaporeans must be able to converse in Standard English when an occasion called for it. The highlights of that year's movement included the appointment of 12 ambassadors for the SGEM 2005. They included taxi drivers, cyber gamers and media personalities.

Partner programmes in 2005–06

- Singapore Plain English Speaking Award (PESA) 2005 was organised by the Ministry of Education and YMCA Singapore from 30 May to 29 July 2005. It took the format of story telling competition for Primary and Secondary students. While the primary school children were to draft and compose their own stories, the secondary school contestants had to pick a topic of interest, plan a speech, and present their ideas and arguments fluently and eloquently through the use of plain English. A total of 140 students participated in the event.
- Workshops and Seminars by SGEM partners: These included Raise-A-Reader Workshop by the National Library Board for parents to develop conducive reading environments for their children. A Mouthful of Words by Reach Learning Centre was organised for children between 9–12 years old and their parents to understand and explore the concept of phonetics and encourage good spoken English.The Hamburger Model: A Story Writing Workshop was organized by Ms Angeline Tan from Creative Culture Consultants which taught 7- to 10-year-old children how to develop interesting storylines and write a story.
- READi Course For Reading Facilitators organized by Society for Reading & Literacy (SRL) aimed to reach out to underprivileged children who had difficulties in reading. Partial sponsorships were given to deserving volunteers who had attended the two-month course. A total of ten volunteers obtained the sponsorship. They later carried out para-intervention or remedial reading sessions in schools, voluntary welfare organisations and libraries for children with reading difficulties.
- Nationwide challenges and competitions were organized by SGEM partners. These included DRAMAmazing race 2 by Singapore Drama Educators Association (SDEA) which involved school students solving puzzles and making use of good English to complete the race that was similar to The Amazing Race, and the inter-school Scrabble Championship 2005 that was put together by Mattel Southeast Asia. Other activities include the SGEM 2005 Pronunciation challenge held by the British Council and the National Library Board between 17 May to 20 June. In the challenge, members of the public logged onto the official SGEM website, listened to and selected the dialogue with the correct pronunciation to win a free course from the British Council.

=== 2006–07 : Be Understood. Not only in Singapore, Malaysia and Batam ===
The 2006 movement was launched by Radm (NS) Lui Tuck Yew, Minister of State For Education on 25 July 2006 at The Plaza, National Library Building. The focus of the year was on creating a standard of English for Singaporeans to be understood anywhere in the world, not just locally but internationally. The highlights of the 2006 movement include starting of the 'English as it is Broken' column in the Generation Y page of The Sunday Times which addressed questions relating to English sent in by its readers. This column continued its run for two years in print and was later adapted to a regularly updated online column on STOMP which still runs today. There have also been daily enquiries regarding English language on STOMP. Its popularity led to the publication of two best-selling volumes of books of the same title- 'English As It is Broken', based on issues brought up from the site.

Partner programmes in 2006–07

- Walk and Talk competition (British Council): During November 2006 – February 2007, students from Primary to pre-university entered the competition by creating short animations films in collaboration with tertiary-level design and technology students.
- Singapore's Favourite Words Contest (British Council): An online contest was held for the public to vote for their favourite English words. The contest concluded with 'love' as Singapore's favourite English word. Other words include 'cool' and 'exhausted'. The winner was given a pair of tickets to the UK. In a follow-up from the larger Singapore's 100 Favourite Words, a competition was held for participants to incorporate the top 10 words in a short story writing competition.
- Golden Point Award 2007 (National Arts Council, The Arts House): The biennial writing competition which began in 1992 was held on 24 April 2007.
- 'Express Yourself' Workshops (British Council): A series of six workshops were conducted for young adults to improve their literacy skills. Each workshop focused on one emotion (e.g. hope, anger, etc.) and looked at different ways of expressing it.
- Getting to Know the International Phonetic Alphabet (National Institute of Education): A two-hour workshop was conducted for the public to learn about the IPA. They were held on 30 September 2006 and 25 November 2006.
- Is Your Child Reading Enough? (Reading Specialists Association, National Library Board): A half-day free forum was held for the public on 9 September 2006 at Bishan Community Library, to raise concerns they may have regarding reading. Topics included : 'What type of Reader is your child?', 'Busting Reading Myths' and 'Ingredients for Raising a Successful Young Reader'.
- Journey through a Story (Creative Culture Education Centre): On 7 September 2006, children at the Cheng San Community Library were taught how to create stories from pictures.
- Child Mother Goose Programme (Fei Yue Family Community Service): A parent-child programme was held at Yishun Community Library on 6 September 2006 to encourage parents to use rhymes and stories to enhance language communication abilities in toddlers.
- Magical Tales from Afar (National Book Development Council of Singapore): On 5 and 6 September 2006, international storytellers narrated stories about their homeland.
- 'English As It IS Broken' (The Sunday Times, Ministry of Education): A new weekly column was introduced in the Gen Y page of the Sunday Times. It addressed questions related to English.
- 2006 Plain English Speaking Award (YMCA Singapore, Ministry of Education, National Library Board) : The public speech competition for students was held in August 2006.
- SGEM Pamphlets & Posters for Retailers (Singapore Retailers Association): Pamphlets and posters which consisted of helpful phrases for communication were distributed in a bid to encourage staff to use Standard English at the workplace.

=== 2007–08 : Rock Your World! Express Yourself ===
Launched by Radm (NS) Lui Tuck Yew, Minister of State For Education on 31 July 2007 at Timbre Music Bistro, the 2007/08 Movement targeted four broad groups – youth, parents, teachers and frontline staff. The key focus was on the youth, while parents, teachers, and frontline staff were seen as the main people to have interactions with them, thus having a vital role in the language input that they receive. The organizers tried to encourage young Singaporeans to express themselves through the arts and music. This year also saw the appointment for the new chairman – Mr Goh Eck Kheng, publisher of Landmark Books for a two-year term from 1 March 2008 to 30 April 2010.

==== Rock Your Word – A social networking initiative ====
From August 2007 to June 2008, the movement held weekly programmes and performances which aimed to allow youths to grow their confidence and fluency with the code. Programmes included music, oratorical performances, film, drama, stand-up comedy, and poetry. In providing a platform for local artists, it had hoped to use the power and reach of those artists to send its message to youths in Singapore. It also used social media platforms such as MySpace, YouTube, Facebook, STOMP, Youth.Sg, The Speak Good English Movement website and blogs by band members.

Partner programmes in 2007–08

- Inspiring Teacher of English Award 2008 (The Straits Times): This was the first national award to acknowledge passionate English teachers in Singapore schools who have ignited love of the English language in their students by using innovative methods to help students speak and write better.
- Good English Tip-off! (Youth.Sg): A monthly series which provided nuggets of information about using English.
- Fat Kids Are Harder To Kidnap – 31 plays in 1-hour (Youth Empire): An interactive theatrical production performed by How Dram company which ran for 3 Wednesdays between 5–16 March 2008.
- Schools Digital Media Awards 2008 (SDMA): In this year, there were some winning entries that were related to good English.
- School Invasion Tour at Temasek Junior College: On 31 January 2008, music acts by Switchfoot, Speak Good English Movement activists, West Grand Boulevard and Caracal were performed for students at Temasek Junior College.
- Speak Good English Day at Singapore Polytechnic: On 28 November 2008, students and lecturers from the School of Business at Singapore Polytechnic held performances to emphasise the importance of speaking good English. The programme included a skits of a Singlish version of Little Red Riding Hood, a courtroom trial as well as a mock debate on the topic "Men Are Redundant".
- English As It Is NOT Broken! (Singapore Polytechnic) held a version of the oratorical competition – Plain English Speaking Award to proficient speakers to represent the school in the annual Plain English Speak Award by the YMCA.
- Switch on to Standard English! & Interactive Storytelling Sessions (Julia Gabriel Centre for Learning, National Library Board): two events were conducted with a talk "Switch on to Standard English!" on how Standard English is crucial to children's success in school, and Interactive Storytelling Sessions which used drama, puppets and music in the process.
- Stories My Grandparents Told Me Storytelling Competition 2007 (Acropolis English Centre, National Book Development council of Singapore): 13 primary school students qualified as finalists in this competition.
- Special Edition of Rock Your World (Timbre Music Bistro & Bar, The British Council): On 5 December 2007, Charlie Dark was brought in for a one-night-only performance.
- Rock Your World @ Youth.SG Contest: Contests were held every last Tuesday of the month where participants had to creatively express an emotion such as 'joy' or 'anger' in any way.

=== 2008–09: I Can ===
Launched by Minister Lim Boon Heng, Prime Minister's Office, on 26 August 2008, the Speak Good English Movement 2008 targeted the workforce who were seen as the people both Singaporeans and international visitors would encounter most frequently. Frontline staff of the service and retail sectors were especially targeted. The message of the tagline of 2008 – 'I Can' was that 'I can help others improve their English.', 'I can take action to improve my English.' and 'I can speak good English if I want to.' In order to encourage willingness to speak and improve their proficiency of Standard English, the movement of this year initiated the classification of Singaporeans into three categories: 1. Singaporeans who can speak Standard English. 2. Singaporeans who cannot yet speak Standard English and are open to improving themselves. 3. Singaporeans who are not able to speak Standard English and do not see the importance of doing so.

Partner programmes in 2008–09

- Service English for Retail Professionals (Singapore Retailers Association): A new training programme called "Service English for Retail Professionals" was launched. It targeted non-fluent English speakers in the service and retail sectors.
- Inspiring Teacher of English Award 2009 (The Straits Times): This was the first national award to acknowledge passionate English teachers in Singapore schools who have ignited love of the English language in their students, used innovative methods to help students speak and write better.
- Schools Digital Media Awards (SDMA) 2009
- The ABCs of Pronunciation (Jan & Elly) : A series of four workshops were conducted at four public libraries. They aimed to help Singaporeans understand and use proper pronunciation on the international stage by using phonemic awareness techniques and giving tips on commonly mispronounced words.
- What Every Parent Needs to Know About Standard Singapore English (RELC and National Library Board): A series of three talks were presented on how parents have an influence on their children's use of Standard English. The titles of the talks are 'What Every Parent Needs to Know About Standard Singapore English' and 'Ten Best Ideas to Teach Your Children to Speak Good English' and ' Using Standard Spoken English at Home'.
- Inspiring Teacher of English award 2008 (The Straits Times) : On 29 October, the inaugural Award ceremony was held at the National Library Building. Nine teachers were presented with the award.
- English As It Is Broken (STOMP): At the website, ongoing question and answer for the public about English was updated daily by an English panel.

=== 2009–10 : Impress. Inspire. Intoxicate. ===
The Speak Good English Movement 2009 was officially launched by Deputy Prime Minister Teo Chee Hean on 28 August with the tagline "Impress. Inspire. Intoxicate": impress those we communicate with, inspire others as role models of good English and using words that intoxicate to make everyday communication more engaging. The tagline also aimed to convey the message that communicating well goes beyond grammar and vocabulary and involves being able to express and be understood as well. The target of this year's movement is young people of the wired generation, aged 18 to 29.

==== Six Lives ====
This year, the movement initiated an online drama titled Six Lives which followed the lives of six friends planning a wedding for their friends John and Huileng. Over a span of 12 episodes, Six Lives aimed to show the importance of communicating well and how 'Impress, Inspire and Intoxicate' can be incorporated into daily situations that friends get into, through the demonstration by the six characters who interacted through blog entries and comments at the Sixlives webpage.

Partner programmes in 2009–10

- Grammar Ninja (STOMP): A contest was held where participants had to take pictures of poor English usage in public places, suggest corrections and post it in the forum according to a different theme each month. The 'Grammar Ninja' with the most significant contribution of the month was awarded a S$100 Kinokuniya book voucher.
- Inspiring Teacher of English Award 2010 (The Straits Times): This was the first national award to acknowledge passionate English teachers in Singapore schools who have ignited love of the English language in their students, used innovative methods to help students speak and write better.
- Work Your Language (Mediacorp Radio's 938LIVE) : It was a weekly radio programme which aimed to enhance the working experience. Though weekly episodes, tips and hints where shared on how to be more effective in the workplace and improve relationships with colleagues with better language skills.
- Fix That Sign (STOMP) :A contest which gave prizes to the top three voted entries of photographs of signs with broken English island wide.
- English As It Is Broken contest (PIONEER): A contest with the Singapore Armed Force's monthly print magazine, which gave away T-shirts for entries of photos with corrections for signs with broken English.
- Language Master 2009 (Teens Network Club): In collaboration with the People's Association Teens Network Club, Language Master was a competition to encourage teens in upper primary and lower secondary to speak in proper English.
- Schools Digital Media Awards 2010 (SDMA): A category open to both student and teachers that was related to good English was included in the competition this year- 'Miscommunication in the English Language'.
- Free English Workshops (The British Council): A series of four free English workshops were conducted on the topics of 'Guiding Children in Reading', 'Learning English Online', 'Singlish vs Standard English' and 'Presentation Skills'.

=== 2010–11 : Get it Right ===
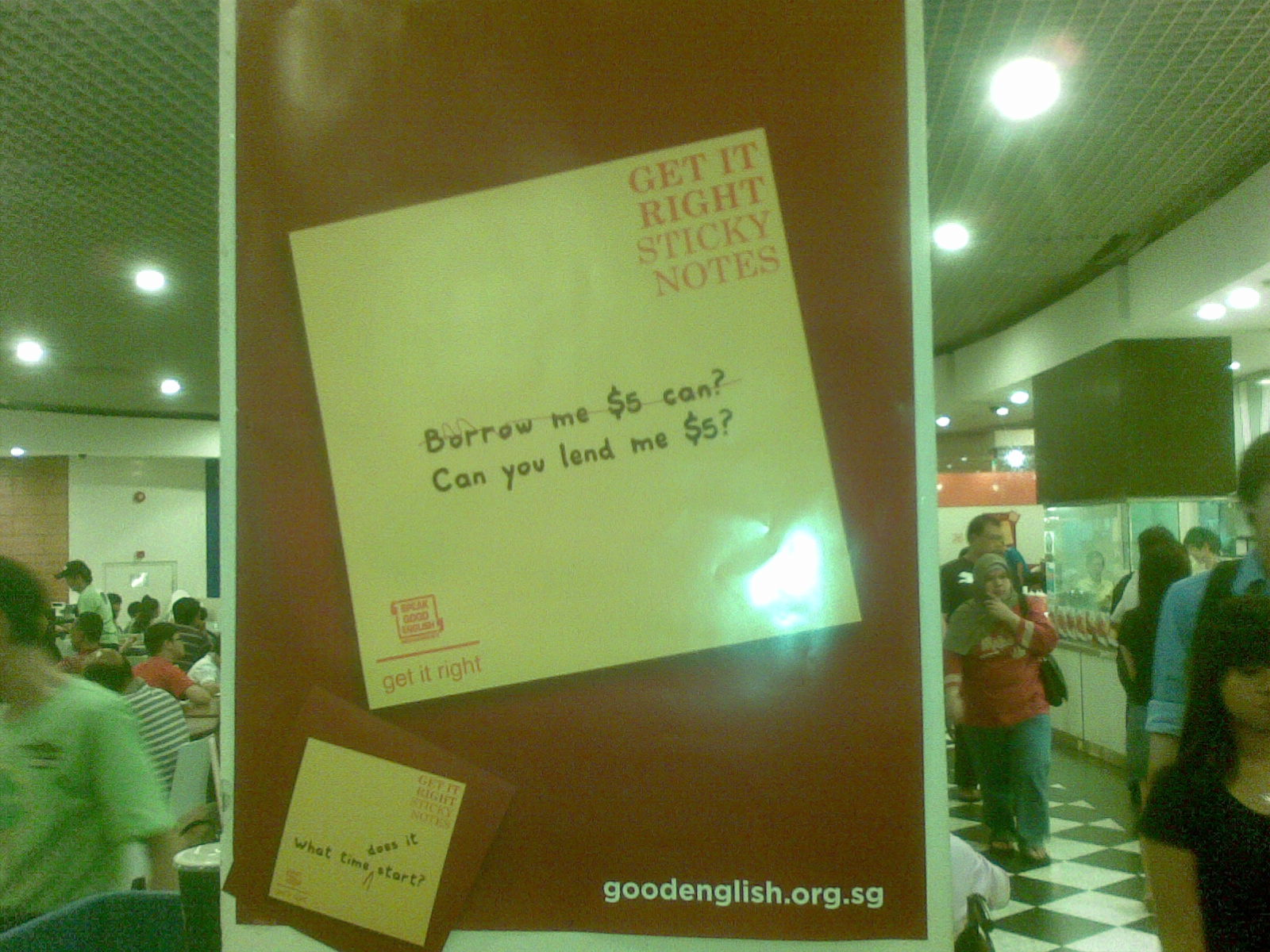
A Get It Right Poster at a food-court displaying a correction of ungrammatical English.

In its 11th year, the Speak Good English Movement 2010 which was launched on 7 September 2010 with the tagline 'Get It Right'. This year's focus is on those who are less proficient in Standard English. It aimed at broadening the environment in which Standard English is used, in order to create a conducive environment where those less proficient in the code can learn by example. Fluent speakers of Standard English are encouraged to use it more frequently in all conversation, regardless if it is with family members, colleagues, hawkers, or taxi drivers.

==== Activist toolkit ====
In a bid for Singaporeans to 'Get It Right'-where those proficient in Standard English take note to use the language accurately and those who are less proficient at it try to use it correctly; the organisers introduced an Activist Toolkit. The Activist Toolkit includes sticky notes, stickers and notebooks. People are encouraged to use the sticky notes to correct English errors that they encounter anywhere. For example, correcting a wrongly expressed sign by pasting a sticky note over it. This tactic is called 'guerrilla-styled' from guerrilla marketing. The current Minister for Community Development, Youth and Sports Vivian Balakrishnan kicked off this year's campaign by being the first to correct a sign at the Xin Food Court at the HarbourFront Centre. He replaced an ungrammatical sign saying 'No outside food allowed' with a one which reads 'No food from elsewhere, please'.

Partner programmes in 2010–11

- English Pronunciation Workshops (Jan & Elly): This partner programme by Jan and Elly offered a series of free pronunciation workshops that were held at public libraries across Singapore. The workshops aimed to teach participants how to understand and use proper English pronunciation in an international environment.
- English Workshop Series (British Council Singapore): The British Council Singapore offered a series of free workshops at public libraries across Singapore from August to December 2010. Topics included 'Know your pronunciation', 'Phonics and Early Learning Literacy' and 'Success with your Presentation'. Reading workshops for children and parents as well as English communication workshops for working adults are also conducted.
- English Workshops for Young Executives (Ascend Education Centre): Ascend Education Centre conducted a series of eight workshops targeting young working executives. The focus was on improving communication skills by brushing up written and spoken grammar of the participants. Some of the topics included: 'Don't Be Tense Over Tenses – Present, Perfect and Past', 'Would You if You Could? – Use of Modals', 'Be Active About Using the Passive', 'Work Your Way Up – Use of Phrasal Verbs', 'Therefore, In Conclusion – Use of Conjunctions and Transition Phrases'
- English As It Is Broken: The citizen journalism and social networking site STOMP collaborated with SGEM to provide an English-language panel which answers readers' questions regarding the English language in the local context on a daily basis. STOMP's continuing partnership with the movement has since produced two books focus on commonly asked questions and mistakes, as well as tips on how to improve the reader's command of the English language. STOMP also launched a free iPhone app, Say It Right, that allows users to listen to the correct pronunciation of words that are most commonly mispronounced by Singaporeans and to look up the definition of these words. The app uses a familiar Singaporean voice to pronounce the words in hopes of making it more appealing and useful to its target audience in spontaneous situations when they are unsure of the pronunciation of a certain word.
- Street Speak (RazorTV): RazorTV, an online television broadcast service launched a five-part video series titled 'Street Speak' was focuses on 5 areas where Singaporeans commonly face difficulties in their daily use of the English language. The series also suggests corrections for self-improvements. The five areas include 'Literal translations', 'Vocabulary', 'Grammar/ Tenses', 'Pronunciation', 'Listening'.
- English Fun Facts (938LIVE): The radio station would run daily programmes featuring fun facts and trivia about English. Examples of topics include 'Did you know that certain English words actually have foreign origins?' and 'Did you know that the meanings of some English words have evolved over time?'

=== 2019 : Let's Connect. Let's Speak Good English ===
With the new appointment of a new chairman after ten years and the formation of a new committee, a new campaign was rolled out on 14 June 2019. Mr. Jason Leow, chairman of Speak Good English Movement, says the movement recognises Singlish as a "cultural marker for many Singaporeans", but good English has value in "promoting understanding, supports business communication and helps us be understood by others wherever English is spoken – internationally and in Singapore."

The logo is a quotation mark symbolising a person in conversation, with the new tagline 'Let's connect. Let's speak good English.'

== Criticism ==
The SGEM has received mixed reactions from its beginning; its strongest opponents have included linguists and social commentators. In response, Liew Choon Boon, Director of the Arts & Heritage Development Division from the Ministry of Information, Communications and the Arts and Ho Peng, Director of Curriculum Planning and Development from the Ministry of Education, wrote in a letter published in The Straits Times on 12 December 2008:

While Singlish may be a fascinating academic topic for linguists to write papers about, Singapore has no interest in becoming a curious zoo specimen to be dissected and described by scholars.

=== Singlish as a marker of Singaporean identity ===
The Speak Good English Movement is the government's effort to encourage Singaporeans to speak Standard English rather than the colloquial form, Singlish. Many Singaporeans have criticised this as trying to eradicate Singlish. Arguing that Singlish is a distinctive marker of Singaporean identity, supporters of Singlish criticise SGEM. Their support for Singlish stems from the belief that Singlish can forge social cohesion and according to some, "It may be the only thing that makes us Singaporean." Likewise, celebrity STOMP blogger Leow Ju Len says in this blog post:

"I mean, our tourism slogan is 'Uniquely Singapore', and what could be more uniquely Singaporean than Singlish?". He also reasons that the beauty of Singlish is the fact that "It's also wonderfully time- and breath-saving. If you need to know the time, you say: 'Now what time?'. It gets the question across in three words. Where got time to say: 'Do you know what time it is now?'"

==== Save Our Singlish Campaign ====
On 27 April 2002, two years after the start of SGEM, TalkingCock launched the Save Our Singlish Campaign. They made it clear at the speech during the launch that they did not oppose the speaking of good English. Rather, they "completely support the writing and speaking of good English" and hoped that SGEM would see the Save Our Singlish Campaign "as complementary, not adversarial". TalkingCock found it important to save Singlish for it is a crucial part of the Singaporean culture and heritage:

Why we're fighting for Singlish, is because it's simply a part of our culture. In fact, it may be the ONLY thing that makes us uniquely Singaporean. It mixes all the various languages, which to me, seems to spread multi-cultural understanding. I thought this was something to be proud of.

Furthermore, they reiterated that "Singlish is not just broken English. It's a patois." They argued that speaking good English should not be promoted at the expense of Singlish. Singapore Watch summed it up with "Speak Singlish proudly, speak English properly." Colin Goh, who started TalkingCock, pointed out that Singaporeans can tell the difference between English and Singlish:

Have more faith in Singaporeans than that. We know when to use Singlish and when not to. We are intelligent enough to know we don't write formal letters in Singlish. When was the last time you typed out, "Eh, give me a job, leh!" And we try not to speak Singlish to our foreign friends because we instinctively know that they might not understand. Or as we say, they'll catch no ball.

He further acknowledged that there are times when improper English is spoken by Singaporeans but reiterated that the blame cannot be pushed onto Singlish:

If Singaporeans' communication with Europeans or Americans is bad, that's because they speak broken English, not Singlish. We all know we can't speak Singlish to foreigners because they'll all catch no ball. That's just common sense. The fault isn't with too much Singlish, it's because English is taught so badly.

In an event held on 24 August 2006, TalkingCock in Parliament: We, the Citizens, Ruby Pan (a former Ministry of Education scholar and a graduate of Princeton University) displayed the ability to switch easily from Standard English to Singlish and to different English accents.

==== Speak Good Singlish Movement ====
The Speak Good Singlish Movement gathers support through a Facebook page which as of September 2013 had 252 members though as reported in a dead link, an identically named group had 3,140 members in December 2012. It began as a response to the launch of SGEM 2010, in particular, its notion of using post-its to correct public signs written in poor English. The page ran its own post-it campaign, called the "Post-its Tak Bak Chew Campaign", inviting supporters to send in snapshots of their own home-made signs with proper Singlish.

The original Facebook page was established on 11 September 2010 with the following statements:

We are not against the Speak Good English Movement in Singapore. But we believe that we should get it right with speaking English as well as Singlish. We are tired of people confusing Singlish with broken English. We are tired of people pretending to speak Singlish by speaking bad English. We are tired of people caricaturising Singlish speakers as uncouth and unintelligent. If you don't bother to learn the subtle rules of a natural evolving language, then please don't conclude that it is simple, shallow, and useless! Singlish is full of cultural nuances and wordplay, and it pulls together the best in the grammar, syntax, and vocabulary of many languages.

In an exclusive interview with The Online Citizen, one of Singapore's key social commentary websites, its unnamed founder directly called into question Dr Balakrishnan's appeal about the SGEM.

=== Hiring "native" English speakers to teach ===
Since Singapore gained independence in 1965, English is taught as a first language and is also the most dominant language in Singapore. All public schools use English as the medium of instruction. But one cannot classify all Singaporeans as native speakers of English because the main languages spoken at home are not necessarily English. In 2006, then Education Minister Tharman Shanmugaratnam mentioned during a dialogue session at a student education conference that his ministry was looking at hiring "native speakers" to teach English language in schools in order to improve the standard of teaching the English language in school. Following this, many Singaporeans wrote in to newspapers forums with questions such as "Why aren't our English teachers suitably qualified?" and wondering if "native English speakers" meant foreign English-speakers hailing from the United States or from Britain.

On 14 June 2006, mrbrown reported in his blog that the Ministry of Education had already put up job advertisements in the British newspaper The Guardian for experienced, qualified native speakers of English to teach English as a first language, English literature, geography, history, knowledge and inquiry.

Subsequently, mrbrown created two podcasts on the mrbrown show to express his views. The first gave insight to what will happen if the implementation of hiring foreign native English speakers to teach English became too successful. The second tells of how he imagines the interviews with the native speaker applicants for the teaching jobs.

In response, Jennifer Chan, Press Secretary to Minister for Education, wrote in a forum letter reply dated 22 June 2006 that:

The criteria for the selection of foreign teachers will remain stringent. Besides academic and teaching qualifications, they should also have a proven track record in teaching in their countries. The individuals may be native speakers or persons who have learnt EL well as a first language

The hiring of "a small number" of foreign teachers was to complement the local teachers in subjects like English, the Mother Tongue Languages and the humanities. This formed part of the plan to bring the standard of English languages in schools to a higher level.

=== The "interference" argument ===
Drawing from notions of linguistic interference, the "interference" argument justifies the need to eliminate Singlish by suggesting that it confuses and contaminates Standard English. It suggests that the inability to distinguish the grammars of the two varieties of English will cause learners to mix their features, thus contaminating the grammar of the standard version.

However, many Singaporeans feel that Singlish is unlikely to negatively affect their proficiency in Standard English. In a 2008 study, about 41% of the Singaporean participants felt that they already have a good command of English. Another study by Wee (2005) has shown that in general, Singaporeans are confident in their code-switching abilities between Singlish and Standard English, which undermines the claims that using Singlish interferes with the learning of Standard English.

== See also ==
- English-only movement
- Languages of Singapore
- Linguistic rights
- Singapore English
- Singlish vocabulary
- Speak Mandarin Campaign
- Language planning and policy in Singapore
