= Language planning and policy in Singapore =

Language planning in Singapore refers to government policies and initiatives that influence the use, learning and status of languages in the country. These policies reflect Singapore's multilingual population and the government's objectives of facilitating communication, supporting the economic development of the country and maintaining law and order.

Singapore has four official languages: English, Malay, Mandarin Chinese and Tamil. Malay is the national language, while English serves as the primary working language in administration. Singapore's language policy is centred around bilingualism. This means that citizens are taught to be proficient in the English Language, as well as a mother tongue which is usually Mandarin Chinese, Malay or Tamil.

The goals of language planning were very much dependent on the political and social forces present in Singapore during two distinct periods: colonisation by the British and the period following the nation's independence from Malaysia in 1965.

== Concepts used by the Singapore Government ==
=== Language Ideology ===
There were two prominent language ideologies that the Singapore government adopted:

- Internationalisation
  - It entails the adoption of a non-indigenous language as an official language. The Singapore government adopted a non-indigenous language, English, to exist alongside the indigenous languages of Singapore.
- Linguistic Pluralism
  - It entails a recognition and support of the co-existence of multiple languages within society.
  - Some believe it to be in contrast with the language ideology of linguistic assimilation, where every member of the speech community, regardless of his first language, must learn the dominant language of the society where he lives in.

The Singapore government attempts to shun away from linguistic assimilation, as it believes it must acknowledge the need to embrace the co-existence of the four official languages in the context of a multi-racial Singapore.

=== Status Planning ===
Status Planning suggests that a particular language or variety may be chosen for specific purposes and given official status. This may result in a language policy which is a product of language planning, and can be comprehended within the discourse of language politics and society, or the more informal but powerful political and social aspects of language planning. In this view, one can argue that language status planning issues are related to political issues as status planning focuses on legislative decisions that affect the reallocation of language functions. Language status can also mean the position or standing of a language vis-à-vis other languages.

=== Acquisition Planning ===
Acquisition Planning can be defined as the co-ordination of the language planning goals of the official parties involved in the implementation and integration of a language policy to ensure its timely and cost effective acquisition.

In Singapore, the government has sole control over the acquisition planning of language. This form of language planning is often done in line with status planning. The government aims to influence aspects of the language, status, distribution and literacy through the education system. Acquisition planning is often incorporated into language planning processes in which the statuses of languages are evaluated, corpuses are revised and these revisions are implemented in society through the education system.

=== Corpus Planning ===
Corpus planning focuses on changes by deliberate planning to the actual corpus or shape of a language. It deals with codification, and can play a significant role in implementation and elaboration stages. Elaboration can be considered as a language task resulting in increased sophistication of the chosen code.

Corpus planning is often undertaken by planners with great linguistic expertise. Corpus planning is also referred as making language planning decisions to engineer changes in the structure of a language. The Singapore Government has been active in status planning and acquisition planning however with regards to corpus planning in English, nothing has been done. The government modelled Singaporean English after Standard British English, without recognising the internal issues of English which must be specific to the local context. Due to the lack of a government body that deals with language issues such as codification and purification, there is negligence to local English. Hence, it becomes difficult to ascertain whether there is a Standard Singapore English.

== Historical Development ==
=== Self Governance and Independence ===
English Language, Mandarin Chinese, Malay Language and Tamil Language acquired official status in Singapore with the foundation of Singapore Legislative Assembly in 1955. After attaining internal self-government in 1959, the Singapore Government officially accepted Malay as the national language of Singapore. Afterwards, these four languages were declared official languages of the Republic of Singapore with the 1965 Singapore Independence Act.

== Official Language policy ==
=== Linguistic and Ethnic Context ===
Singapore is a linguistically and ethnically diverse country with a population of about 5.7 million.

Officially, its ethnic composition is approximately 76.8% Chinese, 13.9% Malay, 7.9% Indian, while the remaining 1.4% are mainly Others, a miscellaneous category.

=== English as the working langauge ===
English serves as Singapore's principal working language and a common means of communication among its ethnically diverse population. Following independence, the government developed English in various functional domains such as the government, law, business, administration, where it became the principal medium of instruction. Additionally, the English language represents the idea of 'modernity' and its association with progress, science, technology and capitalism. English was no longer viewed as a colonial language but rather an international language permitting universal communication. The economic rewards of being proficient in English was emphasised upon.

The use of English as a common language was also intended to reduce the privileging of any single ethnic group, while the designated mother tongues (Mandarin Chinese, Malay and Tamil), were retained to support the preservation of cultural identities. The idea behind this policy is that treating all languages as standard and thus equally prestigious will result in the speakers of each language being treated equally.

Besides government administrative domains where English is widely practised, English has gradually been inculcated into social, family and individual habitats as well. Despite the government's attempt to maintain symbolic and cultural capital in the Mother tongues, English has been deeply integrated into the local linguistic landscape of Singapore.

It is evident that English has acquired a significant role in the linguistic landscape of Singapore, as Singapore is the only (non-native speaker) country which has adopted English as a working language. Short of Singapore, no other country has channelled its language policies into churning out a population that is bi-literate in English and another official language.

=== Malay ===
Malay is valued as the means for transmitting familial and religious values. Malay is widely practised in mosques and religious schools also known as madrasah. The use of Malay language has been largely reduced to religious and classroom domains only. The increase in the number of contexts in which English is being practised has resulted in a large proportion of the Malays assimilating to English.

As a result, the ML 'B' programme was introduced in 2000 to help less linguistically inclined students cope with acquiring the Malay language at oral- language proficiency levels. However, the ML 'B' programme was available only at secondary levels and was not offered at pre-university levels.

=== Mandarin Chinese ===
The Singaporean government also promotes a single, standardised form of Chinese, discouraging the usage of other Chinese varieties. While the Chinese community of Singapore historically spoke several varieties of Chinese, most of them mutually unintelligible, such as Cantonese, Teochew, and Hokkien, the government has promoted Standard Mandarin, both as a means of unifying Chinese Singaporeans under a common language, and to facilitate communication with Chinese people from outside Singapore. Since 1979, the Speak Mandarin Campaign has promoted use of Mandarin.

With respect to Chinese language, the government selected Mandarin Chinese as the variety of Chinese language that takes precedence over other social and regional varieties i.e., Hokkien, Teochew, Cantonese, Hainanese, Hakka. Standardization generally entails increasing the uniformity of the norm, as well as of the norm. The government adopted Mandarin Chinese as one of the four official languages in Singapore and it is mandatory that the Chinese population in Singapore learn Mandarin Chinese as their mother tongue in schools. In addition, the government launched the Speak Mandarin Campaign to promote the prestige of Mandarin Chinese against other Chinese varieties.

==== The Chinese community ====
The Chinese community struggled with learning two languages; English and Mandarin Chinese. When Chinese students were exposed to Mandarin Chinese in school, they felt that the language was foreign and hard to grasp. The home context did not favour the learning of Mandarin Chinese because different Chinese varieties, such as Hokkien, Teochew, Cantonese, Hainanese, Hakka were the dominant mode of communication at home depending on group. The Ministry of Education only allowed Mandarin Chinese in the classroom, other Chinese varieties were seen as inferior in status and were an impediment to learning Mandarin Chinese.

In light of the difficulties faced by the Chinese community, the government made several amendments to the educational system to help Chinese students cope with acquiring Mandarin Chinese:

- With the introduction of EM3 stream, Mandarin Chinese and other Primary school subjects were taught at a lower than mainstream level to help academically less inclined students cope with a less demanding curriculum.
- Introduction of Chinese B Mandarin Chinese is taught at a lower than mainstream level to help students with difficulties in Mandarin Chinese still be able to acquire the language at oral- language proficiency levels.
- Establishment of Singapore Centre for Chinese Language (SCCL) in November 2009. In recognition of Chinese students who come from non –Mandarin speaking homes, the centre aims to enhance the effectiveness of teaching Chinese as a second language in a bilingual environment that is conducive to the needs of these students.
- The Speak Mandarin Campaign (SMC) was organised in 1979 by then Prime Minister Lee Kuan Yew to promote Chinese Language and Culture among Chinese Singaporeans. Essentially this annual event seeks to create heightened awareness of Singaporean Chinese Asian heritage.

=== Tamil ===
Under the Bilingualism Policy, Singaporean Indians only had the option of Tamil for their Mother Tongue. Non-Tamil Indian Students were thus at a disadvantage. In recognition of this, the Ministry of Education revised the Bilingual Policy in 1989 to allow Indian Students to choose between Bengali, Hindi, Punjabi, Gujarati and Urdu as their Mother Tongue.

== Bilingual Education Policy ==
Under the Bilingual Policy, all students are educated in English as their first language. When vernacular schools were closed in 1987, the Ministry of Education implemented the National System of Education.

=== Curriculum Development Institute of Singapore ===
The Curriculum Development Institute of Singapore (CDIS) was formed in 1980 as a division under the Ministry of Education. The institute had the sole task of producing teaching packages under the syllabuses prepared by the Curriculum Planning Division. In 1998, the Ministry of Education recognised a need to incorporate innovative changes to its Education system besides the current Bilingual Policy. The Ministry introduced three important national initiatives: 1)National Education, 2)Information Technology and 3)Thinking Skills, to the school curriculum The Curriculum Planning Division reduced the content of the existing syllabuses to integrate the three national initiatives into the school curriculum.

=== Aims ===
The Ministry of Education ensures that the Bilingual Policy is met by students in Primary and Secondary schools- not only are they required to master English as their first language, they also have to learn their Mother Tongue as a second language. They are offered Mandarin Chinese, Malay or Tamil depending on their father's ethnicity. The Bilingual Policy encourages Singaporeans to be proficient in both the English language, and in their respective ethnic mother tongues, which include Chinese Mandarin, Malay, and Tamil. Bilingual education is provided by the Ministry of Education in Singapore.

The Bilingual Policy also aims to promote better understanding amongst the three ethnic groups in line with the effort of nation building. Additionally, there was also the growing concern that Singapore was facing increasing Western influences, effecting a potential threat of the de-Asianisation or de-culturalisation of the people. Due to the increasing importance of English as an international language, many Singaporeans have started to pay more attention to the learning of the English language and focus less on the learning of their own mother tongue. The Bilingual Policy was then enacted to safeguard Asian identities and values. Alongside English, the Singapore Government aims to promote Mandarin Chinese, Malay and Tamil so as to prevent the erosion of culture and heritage of the three ethnic groups

Racial harmony is a stated policy of the Singaporean government, and a racial harmony day is even celebrated. Usage of four official languages is an element of policy designed to promote racial harmony, as is bilingualism in accordance with the belief that the ethnic language is the "carrier of culture" while English is the "language of commerce", a choice motivated by the fact that English had historically been the language of the colonial administration, while being the native language of few Singaporeans at the time of the policy's implementation.

=== Methodology ===
While English is the core language of instruction in government schools, mother tongue languages are taught on a weekly basis. While "mother tongue" typically correlates to the first language (L1) overseas, in Singapore, the Ministry of Education refers to it as the "ethnic language" or the second language (L2). Singapore's language planning is known as exogenous planning, whereby a foreign language takes on the role as the main language of communication against the indigenous languages in the country. The education system aims to create a workforce that is bi-literate in English and Chinese/Malay/Tamil.

Despite the intentions of the bilingual policy, there has been an inherent and significant shift from a predominant use of Mandarin Chinese to English within the Chinese community. The 1980 Population Census revealed that the use of Malay Language has dropped from 96.7% to 94.3%. The use of English Language in Malay households has increased from 2.3% to 5.5%.

=== Outcome of Bilingual Policy ===
Report on the Ministry of Education, 1978: Assessment of Bilingual Policy:

Formed in April 1978 and led by Deputy Prime Minister, Dr Goh Keng Swee, the Goh Report assessed the bilingual education programme in Singapore. The Ministry of Education saw its Bilingualism policy as not being universally effective. The Goh Report critiqued the Bilingual policy as ineffective bilingualism leading to the main cause of language education problems in Singapore. Although the Bilingual policy resulted in a rise in overall literacy rate, statistics reveal that less than 40% of the School-going Students had the minimum competency level in two languages at a time.

Under the review of Singapore's education system:

- At least 25% of the Primary school cohort did not meet the minimum criteria for literacy levels.
- Only 11% of the armed force recruits were adequately competent in English.
- 97.5% of the Primary 6 students who sat for the Primary School Leaving Examination (PSLE) obtained AL1-6 grades in English.
- 86.9% of the Secondary 4 students who sat for the GCE 'O' Level Examinations obtained A*-C grades in English.
- Despite increasing Language exposure time in the school curriculum, teaching strategies were ineffective in enhancing Students' language proficiency.

=== Challenges and solutions of Bilingual Policy ===
An increasing number of Singaporeans are speaking and using English at home, leading to declining standards in the command of Mother Tongue. The impact of the bilingualism policy however, differs from one ethnic group to another.

==== Revisions made to Bilingual Policy ====
The development and implementation of the Bilingual Policy is an example of acquisition planning.The Bilingual policy places excessive demands on average students. Most students tackle two foreign languages at primary school level because most of them speak Chinese varieties at home and Mandarin Chinese is used in schools for Chinese lessons. The Ministry of Education felt that resources were not effectively employed to meet the goals of the policy. Therefore, amendments were made to allow for more flexibility and to cater to the diverse linguistic needs of the population:

- Students who could not cope with the demands of a Bilingual education could choose to focus on one language, i.e., English.
- Students who were linguistically inclined were encouraged to take on a third language, in addition to English and their Mother Tongue.

Under this new curriculum, the diverse needs of the students could be met and they could effectively maximise their linguistic capabilities. However, the issue of the lack of command in English was highlighted again in the "Report for Moral Education" in 1979.

== Language Promotion Campaigns ==
=== Speak Good English Movement (SGEM) ===
The Speak Good English Movement is a government-initiated campaign.

While the Singaporean government promotes Standard Singapore English as a lingua franca, it heavily discourages the usage of Singlish, a Chinese- and Malay-influenced contact language, widely spoken by Singaporeans, but virtually unintelligible to foreign speakers of English. Governments including those of Lee Hsien Loong, Lee Kuan Yew, and Goh Chok Tong have campaigned against the usage of Singlish, declaring it an obstacle to communication with the rest of the English-speaking world, and a substandard, "broken English", that ought not be part of Singapore's identity. A Speak Good English campaign aims "to encourage Singaporeans to speak grammatically correct English that is universally understood", while urging citizens to purge Singlish from their speech. In line with government policy, schools emphasize standard English, and try to minimise the usage of Singlish in the classroom, holding that Singlish hinders the learning of "proper" English. The Media Development Authority, a statutory board of the government, urges Singaporean mass media to use as little Singlish as possible, declaring it appropriate only for "interviews, where the interviewee speaks only Singlish". Despite these policies, however, the usage of Singlish outside formal, institutional contexts remains widespread.

The Singapore government saw Singlish as a variety whose increasing popularity might threaten the ability of Singaporeans to acquire competence in 'good' English. The latter is prized as a linguistic resource in a world of global economic competition, and the government fears that the presence of Singlish might actually undermine English language proficiency. This led the government, in 2000, to initiate the Speak Good English Movement (SGEM).

On 15 August 1999, The Sunday Times reported Lee Kuan Yew, Singapore's first Prime Minister, commented on Singlish as a 'handicap':

Those Singaporeans who can speak good English should help to create a good environment for speaking English, rather than advocate, as some do, the use of Singlish… Singlish is a handicap we must not wish on Singaporeans.

==== Controversy of the campaign ====
While the Speak Good English Movement has seen progress through its engagement via radio shows, on television programmes, and in giving out the 'Inspiring Teacher of English' award, it has controversy as well. Despite the government's label of Singlish as a 'handicap', the latter endorsed the usage of Singlish on more than one occasion.

===== SARS crisis =====
When the SARS crisis broke out in 2003, the Singapore government commissioned a SARS rap song (sometimes known as the "SAR-vivor Rap") to emphasise the importance of proper hygiene. The lyrics of the SARS rap song are heavily Singlish, containing terms such as "lah", "leh", and "kiasu".

To answer its contradictory stance, the Singapore government provided a rationale that "Singlish was considered necessary in order to communicate with less-educated Singaporeans".

===== Singapore Day =====
Singapore Day is a cultural-cum-cuisine-based event organised by the Prime Minister's Office Overseas Singaporean Unit. It is aimed at engaging Singaporeans residing overseas. It is held in different cities with a significant community of overseas Singaporeans.

According to a report by The Sunday Times on 26 April 2009, the event made occasional use of Singlish, such as the lexical item 'chope', which is used to indicate the reservation of a seat. The intended audience there is not the 'less-educated', since most of the overseas Singaporeans are working professionals or university students pursuing a degree abroad.

=== Speak Mandarin Campaign (SMC) ===
The Speak Mandarin Campaign was launched by then Prime Minister Lee Kuan Yew in 1979. The campaign seeks to encourage the use of Mandarin and to discourage the use of non-Mandarin Chinese varieties, characterising the latter as 'burdens,' as summarized in Goh Chok Tong's (then First Deputy Prime Minister) speech marking the 1986 Speak Mandarin Campaign:

Parents know that our bilingual education system is here to stay, when they drop dialects in conversation with their children they are recognising that the continued use of dialects will add to the learning burden of their children.

=== Outcome ===
The success of the campaign was evident 20 years from the launch of the campaign. The campaign has significantly reduced the number of speakers of non-Mandarin Chinese varieties in Singapore. The use of non-Mandarin Chinese varieties at home dropped from 81.4% in 1980 to 30.7% in 2000. Meanwhile, households that claimed to use Mandarin as the dominant language at home increased from 10.2% in 1980 to 35% in 2000.

Although the campaign is successful in reducing the number of non-Mandarin Chinese varieties speakers in Singapore, it is not always received positively. This is due to two key reasons:

- The Singapore Government does not abandon the usage of non-Mandarin Chinese varieties fully.
- Members from other ethnic groups in Singapore felt that they were not treated fairly.

The reason why Mandarin was chosen among the various Chinese varieties is that it is supposedly able to unite the different Chinese groups, and it is also supposedly the variety associated with ancient Chinese culture and its values. Indeed, Singapore's Chinese schools universally replaced all other Chinese varieties with Mandarin by 1935. This is not to say that the government considers the other Chinese varieties to be totally without cultural value. The government does at times acknowledge that the other Chinese varieties are also capable of conveying traditional Chinese values.

Excerpted from a speech made by then Prime Minister Goh Chok Tong during the 1991 Speak Mandarin Campaign:

Although Chinese literature, idioms and proverb can be translated into English, their full meaning may be lost in the process. A Chinese Singaporean who does not know Chinese- either Mandarin or dialect- runs the risk of losing the collective wisdom of the Chinese civilization.

Non-Mandarin speakers have complained that their children have to study two foreign languages – English and Mandarin. This is contrasted to a possible alternative policy of English and their native language, and that the emphasis on Mandarin threatens family ties, as older generations are often not conversant in Mandarin (unless it is their native tongue). Some critics include that the Mandarin education system's goal of promoting cultural identity has left many younger generations of Mandarin speakers unable to communicate with their non-Mandarin-speaking grandparents.

== Overview ==
Singapore's Bilingual Policy has been commended on contributing to the country's economic success. The social and political stability that Singapore has enjoyed all these years has also been attributed to the Bilingual policy. There are however, a lot existing issues and potential problems underlying the bilingual policy, while the English language was useful in attaining national cohesion within the Multi-racial Country, Mandarin Chinese, Malay Language, Tamil Language have lost their prestige in the society. To rectify these issues, the government, the policy makers and the teaching professions should co-operate with one another. As front-line practitioners, local teachers have direct experience on the needs and difficulties of students. Parents and peers are invisible planners who have power to determine the success of the government's language policy. The collective collaboration of the government, policy makers, local teachers, parents and peers more effective and indigenised language policy can be designed.

Policy discourse in Singapore has largely overlooked the fact that the linguistic market consists of permeable boundaries and the value of linguistic capital for each language changes as internal and external factors interact together. The Ministry of Education was critiqued as failing to recognise that perceptions regarding linguistic capital can change, therefore Language Policy implementation (Bilingual Policy) need to consider the feelings and willingness of the recipients as this ultimately determines the final acceptance and success of the policy. Language Policy and implementations need to consider bottom up processes (Individuals and Unofficial Institutions), and not just designed from the top (Government and Official Agencies). The population's perceptions regarding prestige and image of Ethnic Languages are important parameters that need to be established and analysed in accordance with the Government's Language Policies plans to account for a multicultural country like Singapore.

The political advantages that English has to offer cannot be denied. While the bilingual policy aims to educate its population in enhancing communication in the international market, it is also able to protect the cultural identities of the indigenous groups by embracing multiculturalism. However, the processes of globalisation exert increasing pressure on the population to assimilate towards English at the expense of their mother tongues. While diversity breeds potential threats to globalisation, long-term language planning must be sensitive enough to tackle the precarious linguistic situation to protect Mandarin Chinese, Malay and Tamil (the official languages), perhaps even other mother tongue languages alongside English.

== See also ==
- Directorate of Language Planning and Implementation
- Language planning
- Language ideology
- Language education in Singapore
- Education in Singapore
- Ministry of Education (Singapore)
- Bilingual Education
- Multilingualism
- Speak Good English Movement
- Speak Mandarin Campaign
- Singapore Day
