= STOMP (website) =

News portal/aggregator in Singapore

- Former name: Straits Times Online Mobile Print
- Website type: Online journalism website
- Available in: English
- Founded: June 2006
- Area served: Singapore
- Parent: SPH Media
- Website: https://www.stomp.sg/
- Registration: Necessary
- Launched: June 2006
- Current status: Active

STOMP (formerly Straits Times Online Mobile Print) is a Singapore-based citizen journalism and breaking news website managed by SPH Media. Launched in 2006, STOMP combines user-generated content with journalism.

== History ==
STOMP was launched on 15 June 2006 by SPH Media.

On 30 October 2025, The New Paper merged with STOMP.

== Controversy ==
STOMP contributors, known as STOMPers, have been criticised for submitting xenophobic, racist and sexist content onto the portal. There are also instances of fabricated submissions targeting National Servicemen (NS men) and commuters on public transport.

In 2012, STOMP staff, 23-year-old Samantha Francis, was sacked after submitting a photo of an MRT train moving with the train doors wide open. It was later revealed that she had taken the photo off Twitter. The then-SPH English editor-in-chief, Patrick Daniel, issued an apology to SMRT.

On 24 March 2014, a STOMPer submitted a photograph of an NS man not giving up his seat to an elderly woman on the train. This photo was later found to be doctored – there was an empty seat next to the man which was cropped out of the photo.

In April 2014, an online petition to close down the portal became popular. The petition garnered close to 23,000 signatures as of 15 April 2014. Robin Li, creator of the petition, said: "STOMP has failed to rectify and set simple sensible guidelines before any irresponsible netizen contributes a fabricated story without getting the right facts." Media Development Authority responded that "it will not influence the editorial slant but will take firm action if there is a breach of public interest or the promotion of racial and religious hatred or intolerance."
