= Contact language =

Language developed for communication between populations

A contact language is a language developed spontaneously by two (or more) populations, each initially speaking their own language, as they come into regular contact and find ways to communicate together – whether for trade or other reasons.

Contact languages have varying degrees of complexity, depending on the duration and intensity of social relations between the two groups. They may range from basic trade languages with limited vocabulary to fully-fledged language systems, known as pidgins and creoles.

When the resulting language shows a rough balance between elements of both original languages, it is labelled a hybrid or mixed language. When the contact language results from the merger of dialects that were already close to begin with, the resulting contact language is known as a koiné.

== See also ==
- Sabir language
- Pidgin
- Creole language
- Mixed language
- Language contact
- Lingua franca
