= Manglish =

Contact language in Malaysia

- Colloquial Malaysian English
- Bahasa Inggeris Malaysia Basahan
- Native to: Malaysia
- Region: All urban centres across Malaysia
- Language family: Indo-European: Germanic; West Germanic; Ingvaeonic; Anglo-Frisian; Anglic; English; Southeast Asian English; Malaysian English; Manglish
- Writing system: Latin

Official status
- Official language in: Not official, de facto Malaysia

Language codes
- ISO 639-3: None (mis)
- Glottolog: None
- IETF: cpe-MY

Manglish is an informal or basilect form of Malaysian English with features of an English-based creole principally used in Malaysia. It is heavily influenced by the main languages of the country, Malay, Tamil, and varieties of Chinese. It is highly colloquial and not one of the official languages spoken in Malaysia.

Manglish spoken in Peninsular Malaysia is very similar to and highly mutually intelligible with Singlish of Singapore. There is generally little distinction between the two, although Singlish speakers may use fewer words derived from Malay and more from Chinese languages (particularly Hokkien and Teochew).

The vocabulary of Manglish consists of words originating from English, Malay, Hokkien, Mandarin, Cantonese, Tamil, and, to a lesser extent, various other European languages and Arabic, while Manglish syntax resembles southern varieties of Chinese. Also, elements of American and Australian slang have come through from imported television series. Manglish is sometimes historically known as Bahasa Rojak, but it differs from the latter by the use of English as the base language. The term rojak derives from "mixture" or "eclectic mix" in colloquial Malay. The East Coast (Kelantan and Terengganu) and Borneo versions (Sarawak and Sabah) of Manglish may differ greatly from that of the western coast of West Malaysia.

Besides mixing multiple languages, Manglish includes mixing the syntax of each language. Idioms, proverbs and phrases are also often translated directly to English from Malay, Chinese, and Tamil. The accent and vocabulary used are highly dependent on the formality of the context and language dominance of the speaker. The speaker would also vary the quantity of Manglish spoken depending on their counterpart. As a result, foreigners unfamiliar with the region are generally unable to grasp Manglish; it is mostly understandable only to native-born Malaysians and some Singaporeans.

== History ==
The term Manglish is first recorded in 1989. Other colloquial portmanteau words for Manglish include (chronologically): Malish (1992), Malaylish (1992), Malenglish (1994), Malglish (1997), Malayglish (2005), and Malanglish (2013).

Manglish shares substantial linguistic similarities with Singlish of Singapore, although distinctions can be made, particularly in vocabulary. Initially, "Singlish" and "Manglish" were essentially the same language, when both Singapore and the states now comprising Peninsular Malaysia were under various forms of direct and indirect British rule, though never forming a single administrative unit except for a brief period between 1963 and 1965. (See Malaya.) In old British Malaya, English was the language of the British administration whilst Malay was the lingua franca of the street. Even non-Malays such as the Chinese and Indians would speak Malay when addressing their counterparts who did not speak their language.

English as spoken in Malaysia is based on British English and called Malaysian English. British spelling is generally followed. Since 1968, Malay has been the country's sole official language. While English is widely used, many Malay words have become part of common usage in informal English or Manglish. An example is suffixing sentences with lah, as in, "Don't be so worried-lah", which is usually used to present a sentence as rather light-going and not so serious; the suffix has no specific meaning. However, Chinese languages also make abundant use of the suffix lah and there is some disagreement as to which language it was originally borrowed from. There is also a strong influence from Malay, Hokkien, Cantonese, Mandarin, and Tamil, which are other major languages spoken in Malaysia. Manglish also uses some archaic British terms from the era of British rule (see "gostan" and "outstation" below).

== Malaysian English and Manglish ==
In Malaysia, Manglish is considered to be a less formal form of Malaysian English which has features of a pidgin or a creole, rather than a fully-fledged creole language. While all varieties of English used by Malaysians may be considered Malaysian English, some make a distinction between Malaysian English and Manglish; Malaysian English being a form of English that largely follows the standard rules of English grammar but with some local characteristics, while Manglish is a pidgin that does not follow the grammatical rules or structure of English. Many Malaysians however tend to refer to the colloquialisms used by those taught in English-medium school as Malaysian English, while some argued for the basilect form or pidgin as the "real" Malaysian English. At the lexical level, limited lexis is used and consequently, a number of words serve a variety of functions, giving extended meanings not normally accepted in standard British English.

There are some differences of contemporary words used between Malaysia and the United Kingdom. The use of Manglish is discouraged at schools, where only Malaysian Standard English is taught.

The term Malaysian English is not used in any official context except for the ever-changing school curriculum modules in attempts to improve the command of English but without going into advanced lessons.

It is however, possible to speak Manglish without substituting English words with those from another language.

== Influences from other languages ==
Speakers of Manglish from the country's different ethnic groups tend to intersperse varying amounts of expressions or interjections from their mother tongue – be it Malay, Chinese or one of the Indian languages – which, in some cases, qualifies as a form of code-switching.

Verbs or adjectives from other languages often have English affixes, and conversely sentences may be constructed using English words in another language's syntax. People tend to translate phrases directly from their first languages into English, for instance, "on the light" instead of "turn on the light". Or sometimes, "open the light", translated directly from Chinese.

Aside from borrowing lexicons and expressions at varying levels depending on the speaker's mother tongue, Malay, Chinese and Tamil also influence Manglish at a sentence formation level.

For example, Chinese languages do not mark the verb for tenses. Instead, information about time is often acquired through contextual knowledge or time-specific markers such as 'yesterday', 'today' and 'tomorrow'. This is also replicated in Manglish with sentences like 'She go to the shop yesterday' and 'I come here every day'.

The Chinese also tend to speak Manglish with staccato feel as it is syllable-timed, unlike English which is stress-timed.

=== Duplication of words ===
Chinese, Malay and Tamil languages often duplicate words for different functions such as to show pluralisation, emphasis or repetition. Similarly, this has influenced the duplication of English words when speaking Manglish, especially when placing emphasis on certain words or to show pluralisation.

Some examples include:

- You don't noisy-noisy ah, I whack you later then you know. (Don't be too noisy or I'll discipline you later.)
- That boy you dated last time is the short-short one in the party is it? (Was the boy you used to date the very short one we met at the party?)

== Words and grammar ==
Manglish is topic-prominent, like Chinese and Malay. This means that Manglish sentences often begin with a topic (or a known reference of the conversation), followed by a comment (or new information). Compared to Standard English, the semantic relationship between topic and comment is not important; moreover, nouns, verbs, adverbs, and even entire subject-verb-object phrases can all serve as the topic:

- "That school Chinese orchestra very good one." (The Chinese orchestra of that school is very good.)
- "She play violin very bad leh." (She's very bad at playing the violin.)
- "Yesterday she also give homework, too much lah." (She also gave homework yesterday, there's too much.)
- "Discussed finish already." (We've finished discussing already. 'Already', which is sudah in Malay, is used to mark verbs referring to the past. Malay itself has no verb tenses. Consequently, manglish can use 'already' to indicate a past or completed action despite 'finish' being in the present tense.)

The above constructions can be translated analogously into Malay and Chinese, with little change to the word order.

The topic can be omitted when the context is clear, or shared between clauses. This results in constructions that appear to be missing a subject to a speaker of Standard English, and so called PRO-drop utterances may be regarded as a diagnostic feature of Manglish. For example:

- "Stupid lah." (This is stupid.)
- "Why don't want come?" (Why don't you want to come?)

=== Nouns ===
- "ang mo" – White people, from Hokkien "red hair" (紅毛). Used by Chinese, while the Malays use Mat Salleh {see below}. Gweilo may be used in Cantonese.
- "chop" – stamp (also used as verb). From Malay 'cop' meaning stamp e.g. "Put your company chop on the receipt".
- "dollar" – a loaned currency used especially in relation to business transactions, in lieu of "ringgit" (Ringgit Malaysia).
- "Mat Salleh" - a Malay term to describe white people.
- "outstation" – out of town (e.g. going outstation), from the colonial era when British officials went to hill stations to escape the heat.
- "terrer" – (pronounced as the English "terror") Refers to someone or something being awesomely amazing or good (e.g. "Bloody hell, that guy is terrer!").

=== Adjectives ===
- "action / ackshun/ eksyen" – showing-off, arrogant, from English "action".
- "aiksy / lan si" – arrogant, overconfident. Laan si is of Cantonese origin.
- "best" - superlatively good, see also syok/shiok.
- "blur" – confused, unfocused, ignorant.
- "chop" – stamp (of approval). (Due to confusion of the usage of the Malay word "cap". [E.g. I got the chop for my letter from the office lah.])
- "cincai" – casually, simply, doing things as one pleases. Comes from Hokkien chhìn-chhái (凊彩) for "simply", "casual" or "slipshod". E.g. "I just cincai order a dish from the menu."
- "geng" – great, amazing, used to describe a person. e.g. "Wah, he is so geng."
- "geram" – to be annoyed, irritated, pissed off. Originally from Malay meaning "angry" or "to feel agitated". e.g. "Eh look at his attitude lah, geram only!"
- "la-la" – flashy, gaudy appearance. "La-la" replaces the older derogatory term "Ah Lien" that is used to describe girls who wear heavy make-up and outstanding clothes and accessories, which usually end up being rather bad taste instead of looking sophisticated or in fashion. They also usually sport brightly coloured hair. "La-la" can also be used to describe the things these girls are known to wear. E.g. "That salegirl was very la-la"/"The clothes are so la-la." These days, the term is also used to describe guys who sports outstanding/bizarre hairstyle and wear outstanding clothes and accessories resulting in bad taste as well. "la-la zai" and "la-la mui" is commonly used to make distinctions between the genders, with the former referring to guys and the latter referring to girls. The "la-la's" also feature rather punkish attitudes.
- "macam yes" – to describe when a person believes he is amazing, when in reality, he is not. 'Macam' is a Malay word meaning 'as if' or 'like', and 'yes' in this context means 'amazing/great/best/right'. e.g. "He macam yes one." (He believes he is so great.)
- "ngaam ngaam" - just. From Cantonese (啱啱), e.g. "It ngaam-ngaam fits in." (It fits in just right.)
- "pai-seh" – ashamed, embarrassed/embarrassing. 'pai-seh' (歹勢) is of Hokkien origin [E.g.: I kena punish lah... very pai-seh eh!].
- "slumber" – relaxed, laid-back; possibly a conflation of the Malay "selamba", meaning nonchalant, and the English "slumber".
- "sup-sup sui" – easy, no big deal. 'Sup-sup sui' (濕濕碎) is of Cantonese origin.
- "seng" - refer to "geng"
- "syok / shiok" – indicates the object as superlatively good. "Syok" or "shiok" is a borrowing from Malay syok meaning "pleasing" or "attractive", possibly originally Persian šoḵ (cheerful, spirited) or Arabic šawq (desire, passion).
- "tidak apa" - to have a happy-go-lucky attitude, or be indifferent. From Malay.
- "ulu" - uncultured or remote, from Malay meaning upriver or remote interior of country. The word has also entered British military slang to mean a remote jungle place.
- "yellow" – dirty-minded, perverted. Direct translation of Chinese word for yellow to describe a perverted or dirty-minded person. e.g. "Aiyer, he is very yellow, better stay away from him." (He is very perverted, you should stay away from him.)

=== Adverbs ===
- "agak agak" - approximately, roughly, from Malay for "guess".
- "sibeh" – very, extremely. From Hokkien (死爸). Used when wanting to put an emphasis on something saying it is great or big—whether it is in a good or bad way does not matter as long as it is "huge" e.g. : "That guy is sibeh annoying lo."

=== Verbs ===
- "beh tahan" – cannot stand something. "beh" comes from Hokkien, meaning cannot. "tahan" comes from Malay, meaning stand or tolerate. Used mostly among Chinese. e.g. "I beh tahan him la." (I cannot stand him anymore.)
- "cabut / cantas" – to run off, flee or to escape ('Cabut' is a Malay word meaning to pull or pulling out as a transitive verb, or to become detached as an intransitive verb.)
- "gostan" – reverse a vehicle, probably from the nautical term "go astern" (mostly used in Terengganu, Kelantan, Kedah and Penang) or "go stunt". Sometimes also expressed as "gostan balik" (lit., reverse back).
- "jadi" – happened, succeeded (derived from the Malay word 'jadi', and may sometimes mean 'so' as in, "Jadi?" = "So what?")
- "jalan" or jalan-jalan – to walk (from Malay for "road" or "walk")
- "kacau" – to disturb, e.g.: Please don't kacau me. From Malay for "disturb" or "disorganised".
- "kantoi" – to get caught ("I kena kantoi..." means, "I got shafted/reprimanded/caught")
- "kena" – to experience/get caught/punished; often used like a noun. e.g. "I sure kena if I cheat". (I'm sure to get punished if I cheat.) From the Malay passive verb "kena".
- "kenasai" / "kanasai" – to get into trouble, a mix of Malay kena meaning "get" or "meet" and Hokkien sai (屎, faeces) to form the phrase "hit by shit".
- "makan" – to eat (Malay), often refer to lunch or dinner (Malay) (e.g. "You makan dy?" means "Have you taken your dinner/lunch?")
- "kow-kow" / "kowkow" / "kaukau" – (pron: Kao-kao) used to stress a personal satisfaction on a specific action specified before. The stress can be due to shock, anger, pain, or pleasure. Example: He got it kow kow ("He got it badly")
- "lempang" – literally "bash" in Malay but usually refers to a slap. Example: He can lempang your face.
- "makan" – Take a bet (e.g. "I makan 1/2 biji on Manchester United" means "I bet 1/2 handicap on Manchester United")
- "mamak" / "mamak stall" – from the term mamak (a slang for Indian or Indian Muslims), it is used to refer to Indian Muslim restaurants in Malaysia. Example: let's go eat at a mamak lah.
- "mempersiasuikan" - to embarrass, derived by adding Malay affixes "mem", "per" and "kan" to a Hokkien word "sia suay" (泻衰) meaning shame.
- "minum" – to drink (Malay)
- "on/off" – to turn something on or off, respectively (e.g. "Don't forget to off the fan.")
- "pakat" - gang up. From Malay. e.g. "They pakat against me la, if not I win lo." (They ganged up against me, if not I would have won.)
- "pengsan" – to faint (Malay)
- "pon" – to skip school/play truant/apon (from Malay "ponteng", meaning the same)
- "saman" – to issue a fine, usually in relation to a traffic offence, from "summons".
- "shake leg" - idling, not doing anything, from Malay "goyang kaki".
- "siam" – to avoid (e.g. "Boss is coming. I siam first.")
- "sit" – this English word is used for riding in a vehicle in the way the equivalent words are used in Malay and in Chinese dialects, e.g. "sit bus" for "take the bus".
- "tahan" – to stand, to bear ("Cannot tahan her perfume! So strong!"). From Malay "tahan", to endure, to withstand.
- "tumpang-ing" – riding in someone else's vehicle or lodging at someone else's house, from the Malay verb "tumpang" + "-ing".
- "yam-cha/yum-cha" – socializing with friends usually in "mamak stalls", but other places also apply. Generally identifies with "go have a drink". Derived from the "yum cha" used in Cantonese.
- (any Malay word) + the English suffix "-ing" – doing a certain action, e.g. "Makan-ing (short for "tengah makan" or "I'm eating right now"), "He's d one dat tipu-ing me leh.." (meaning "He's the one cheating me!").

=== Interjections ===
- "Alamak" – exclamation of surprise or shock. (E.g. "Alamak!" (Oh no!)). From the Malay exclamation 'alamak', probably a contraction of "Allah" and "Mak" (mother).
- "Abuden?" - Combination of Hokkien "A-bo", meaning "if not" in English, and the word "then". It is also equivalent to simply saying "Obviously". Usually used a sarcastic response to an obvious observation or question.
- "Adoi" - exclamation like an "Ouch!" From Malay.
- "Aiya" - exclamation to express surprise or dismay. From Chinese. e.g. "Aiya, it's raining leh, cannot go out liao." (Aiya, it's raining, we cannot go out anymore.)
- "Aiyer" – exclamation to express disgust. Derived from Chinese. e.g. "Aiyer, there's vomit all over the floor."
- "Anoh" – exclamation to express agreement. Used mostly among Chinese.
- "Bo jio" – A term in Hokkien meaning "no invitation" (bo jio, 無招). It may be used to annoy friends or families when they are having a better time than the speaker.
- "Cehwah / Huiyooh / Fuyoh / Fuiyoh / Fuiyor / Fulamak / Aiseh" – exclamation of amazement/wonder/marvel. (E.g. Fuyoooh, his hair so jinjang!)
- "Cheh" - from Malay, to express disgust.
- "Deyh!" – meaning bro. Borrowed from Tamil.
- "Die / Finish / Gone / Habis / Mampus / Mampui / Sei / See / GG / Pok kai /" – generic exclamations from various languages to indicate "trouble", used like the English "dead" or "dead end", but the word "die" does not mean to die literally. "Sei" is usually pronounced as its Cantonese equivalent, "die". (E.g. Today he die because of that loan shark (Today, he is in trouble because of the loan sharks.).
- "Geli"- meaning disgusting. Example: "Eh, this thing very geli eh!" (Hey, this thing is very disgusting!)
- "Haiz/Haish" – similar to sighing. e.g. "Haiz, still got work to do." (Haiz, I still have work to do.)
- "Izzit?" – expression of mild unbelief. ("Really? ", basically, "Is it?").
- "Jinjang" – a term to explain one's appearance, being out of fashion or old-fashion, e.g. The guys over there are so jinjang! (Jinjang is also a sub-urban town in Kuala Lumpur, Malaysia.)
- "Giler Ah!" – exclamation of shock or amazement. From the Malay word 'gila' which means mad or crazy. Sometimes it is used to refer to people who act rudely or uncivilized in public.
- "Neh" (high pitch) – used to emphasize to remember something. e.g. "Neh, the guy that wear yellow shirt ah, he fall down yesterday." Probably from the nasalisation of English "there".
- "Neh" (rising pitch) – used to emphasize pointing to something. e.g. "Neh, the toilet is over there." Probably from the nasalisation of English "there".
- "Oi" - to call someone. It has a disrespectful connotation and often used rudely. e.g. "Oi, come back here."
- "Podaa!" – from Tamil equivalent to the American phrase, "Get out!" when expressing disbelief
- "Siao" – crazy. From Hokkien siao (痟). e.g. "Siao ah you" (Are you crazy)
- "Walao" or "Walao eh" – also an exclamation of amazement, either from Hokkien or Teochew
- "Wah" - to express amazement. From Cantonese (嘩).
- "Watodo" – a rhetorical "What do do?" (Example, "It has already happened. What can we do?").
- "Wei" – exclamation when conversing to a close friend, or used as "hello" when answering phone (from Chinese 喂, "wei")
- "Woi" – exclamation to express annoyance. e.g. "Woi, you siao ah, where can do this one?" (Woi, are you crazy, how can we do it like this?)

=== Grammar ===
- "(Subject + predicate), is it?" – this is often used as a question. "It" doesn't refer to the subject, but rather to the entire preceding clause ("Is it so?") This is comparable to the French phrase "n'est-ce pas?" (literally "isn't it?") and the German usage of "..., oder?" (literally "..., or?")

=== Phrases ===
- "Open collar, pocket no dollar" – expression reflecting linkage between extravagant appearance and persona, and illusion of wealth
- "That's why" - expression used to express agreement with a statement (Example: "It's so hot today!" "That's why!")

== Particles ==
=== Lah ===
The ubiquitous word lah ([lɑ́] or [lɑ̂]), used at the end of a sentence, can also be described as a particle that simultaneously asserts a position and entices solidarity.

Note that 'lah' is often written after a space for clarity, but there is never a pause before it. This is because originally in Malay, 'lah' is appended to the end of the word and is not a separate word by itself.

In Malay, 'lah' is used to change a verb into a command or to soften its tone, particularly when usage of the verb may seem impolite. For example, "to drink" is "minum", but "Here, drink!" is "minumlah". Similarly, 'lah' is frequently used with imperatives in Singlish, such as the command, "Drink lah!" (Come on, drink!). 'Lah' also occurs frequently with "Yah" and "No" (hence "Yah lah" and "No lah"), resulting in a less brusque sound, thus facilitating the flow of conversation.

It is also possible that Lah comes from Cantonese. In Cantonese, Lah (啦) is placed at the end of a sentence in imperatives making it sound more like a request than an order.

It might have Tamil origin as well. Lah is still used widely in Southern Tamil Nadu (Thirunelveli, Kanyakumari district) in the same manner. Tamil is said to be more pure in this region than northern Tamil Nadu and had ancient trade link with south east Asia.

Lah is often used with brusque, short, negative responses:

- Don't have lah! (Brusque response to, "Lend me some money, can?")
- Don't know already lah! (Brusque response to someone fumbling with an explanation. Mostly by Chinese.)

Lah is also used for reassurance:

- Don't worry, he can do it one lah – Don't worry, he can get it done.
- It's okay lah – It's all right.

Lah can also be used to emphasize items in a spoken list, appearing after each item in the list but is not commonly used in this context.

- They got sell Nasi Lemak lah, Roti Canai lah, Chapatti lah; Everything got lah!

Although lah can appear nearly anywhere, it cannot appear with a yes–no question. Another particle should be used instead. For example:

- Where are you ar? (This is especially of Chinese origin.)

The Chinese influence in Manglish, however, can be seen among other races in Malaysia, especially when conversing with Chinese-speaking people. This principle can be generally applied to all forms of non-standard English spoken in Malaysia.

=== Loh ===
'Loh' or 'lo' (囉) is used in the same context as "lah". It serves as a final particle to intensify a decision that is definitive and irrevocable.

In most cases, loh is used in direct response to a question or query with the connotation that the respondent is somewhat impatient or annoying because the person thinks that the answer is so obvious that the question should not have been raised from the start. In fact, the questioner might have no idea beforehand about the rude reply that would be shot back to him/her, though it can be argued that the word 'lah' might deliver stronger emotions from the speaker.

For example, to show argumentative mood or making emphasis, one would say, "You lo (it's your fault), if it's not for you we wouldn't be in trouble now!" and possibly in response, the other would say, "Eh, I never forced you to follow me here loh!" Another example is "traffic jam loh!" when asked by a friend why he or she is late to an occasion.

Sometimes, loh is used to express insincerity while speaking, for instance when one says "sorry loh" or "thank you loh".

However, in some cases, the use of loh is only intended to give an advice without any notion of impatience. Examples: "I think he's being unreasonable loh" or "if you ask you will know loh".

In lesser cases, using "loh" can make some emphasis or convey a jovial atmosphere. For example, "I came all the way for you loh" and "Nah, that one loh, that fat chubby one in a yellow shirt loh".

"Loh" is mostly used by the Chinese community in Malaysia, because of its Cantonese origin.

=== Meh ===
"Meh" is commonly used at the end of a question. It is usually used with a sense of confidence in his or her own statement but the hint of doubt towards the other person. For example," I like her, cannot meh?" (meaning "I like her. What's wrong with that?").

"Meh" is of Cantonese origin (咩). In Cantonese or Hakka, "meh" is a final particle that transforms statements into questions that indicate doubt or surprise.

== Phonology ==
Manglish has its unique set of features when spoken by native Malaysians that are distinct from the standard variety of English. Though very similar to spoken Singlish, the two should not be considered the same variety.

Manglish is non-rhotic

- Sometimes referred to as r-fullness/r-lessness, spoken Manglish is similar to the standard variety of English in Singapore and Britain, in that the final /r/ consonant is dropped during speech. Words such as 'water' and 'player' are transcribed as /wɒtə/ and /plejə/ respectively.

There is no distinction between long and short vowels

- In Manglish, long vowels such as /ɑː/ and /ɜː/ are usually pronounced no differently from /ʌ/ and /ə/ respectively. For instance, 'father' is pronounced as /fʌdə/ instead of /fɑːðə/.

Diphthongs are reduced to monophthongs

- Diphthongs are usually reduced. For instance, /eɪ/ is reduced to /e/ in words such as 'later'. So instead of /leɪtə/, Manglish speakers tend to say /letə/. As another example, 'so' and 'go' are pronounced as /so/ and /go/ instead of /soʊ/ and /goʊ/.

Dental fricatives /ð/ and /θ/ are pronounced as dental plosives instead.

- Dental fricatives are often not enunciated in Manglish the way it is in standard varieties of English. Instead, they are pronounced as plosives. Hence, words like 'this' /ðɪs/ is pronounced as 'dis' /dɪs/ (voiced), and 'thing' /θɪŋ/ is pronounced as /tɪŋ/ (voiceless).

Omission of final consonants

- Final consonants of words are often left out in spoken Manglish. Some examples include 'dun' (don't), 'fac' (fact), 'adap' (adapt).

== Usage of Manglish on the Internet ==
The use of Manglish can be commonly found on the internet, especially amongst bloggers.

	Nouns	Adjectives	Verbs	Phrases
1)	Aircon: abbreviation of air conditioning.	Syiok Sendiri: used to express the feeling of getting carried away or amusing oneself.	Ciplak: describing plagiarism	Goyang Kaki: when translated into English, it means "shake leg". To Malaysians, shaking one's legs means that the individual has nothing to do and is simply laying around.
2)	Gegirls: a slang that became popular due to its frequent usage by local television comedians as a friendly nickname used for girls. It can also be used to describe a group of girls.	Chincai: originates from Hokkien, means a non-serious or simple attitude committed by a person in ignorance attitude without thinking of the possible consequences that might occur as a result from the chincai attitude. E.g. I chincai paraphrase and summarise.	Pau: indicative of asking someone to buy something or give money.	Makan-makan: used by Malaysians to describe small dining events such as small gatherings at home or with friends.
3)	Kapcai: a small motorcycle. It combines the Honda Super Cub motorcycle with the Cantonese word "chai", meaning extremely small.	Cibai: a swear word often used by Malaysians. Derived from the Hokkien word referring to the female sexual organ. Can also mean shit, bastard and other profanities.	Membawang: a slang word derived from Malay that means to gossip. 'Bawang' means 'onion'. 'Mem' is a prefix for a verb. This slang word came about as there are many 'aunties' that gossip together while peeling onions.	
4)	Uncle/Aunty: Malaysians refer to all middle-aged adults as uncle and aunty despite having no blood relation.	Gatal: When translated from Malay, the word has the meaning of "itchy" in English. The word however means "on purpose" or indicate female concupiscence		
5)		Lansi: a profanity describing individuals with an arrogant attitude.		
6)		Sepet: someone who has slit and narrow eyes and often used when describing the eyes of the Chinese.		

== Miscellaneous ==
"There is"/"there are" and "has"/"have" are both expressed using got, so that sentences can be translated in either way back into British / American English. This is equivalent to the Chinese 有 yǒu (to have):

- Got question? – Is there a question? / Do you have a question?
- This bus got air-con or not? – Is there air-conditioning on this bus? / Does this bus have air-conditioning?
- Where got!? – lit. Where is there [this]?, also more loosely, What are you talking about? or Where did you get that idea?; generic response to any accusation. Derived from Malay sentence "Mana ada" – 'Mana' (Where) 'ada' (got) and also from Chinese sentence "哪里有" – '哪里' (Where) '有' (got).

Can is used extensively as both a question particle and an answer particle. The negative is cannot:

- Gimme lah, ok or not? – (Give it to me, OK?)
- Can! – (Sure!)
- Can! – (Yes, that is possible)
- Cannot. – (No way.)

=== Pronouns ===
There is a tendency to drop referential pronouns (I, you) in Manglish. This is due to direct translations of Chinese and Malay in which it is unnecessary. For example, "you" and "I" in the following sentences is omittable.

- "(you) never do anything right" (None of the things that you do is correct.)
- "(you) always also cannot, cannot, cannot" (You always prohibit (me) from doing something)
- "你可以做这个吗？" (Can you do this?)

"可以。" ((I) can.)

- "Kau boleh buat ini ke?" (Can you do this?)

"Tak boleh." ((I) cannot.)

=== Noun phrases ===
There is a tendency to use plural forms for uncountable nouns such as 'staffs', 'equipments', 'informations', 'criterias' and 'phenomenons'. Additionally, some articles are often dropped.

== Comparisons with Singlish ==
Manglish and Singlish share a common history and some common characteristics. The difference between Manglish and Singlish can be subtle and sometimes difficult to be distinguished even among Malaysians and Singaporeans. However, Manglish is markedly more influenced by the Malay language, with Malaysia being an ethnic Malay majority country; while Singlish is more influenced by Chinese languages, with Singapore being an ethnic Chinese majority country. However, any subtle differences between the two is generally lost to a foreigner's ears who is unfamiliar with both Malaysia and Singapore.

== See also ==
- British and Malaysian English differences
- Malaysian English
- Singapore English
