= Variant form =

A variant form may refer to:

- Variant Chinese characters
- Variant form (Unicode)

== Alternative spellings ==
  - American and British English spelling differences
  - British and Malaysian English differences
  - Orthographical variant (in biology)
