= Bahasa Rojak =

Pidgin language of Malaysia

Bahasa Rojak (Malay for "mixed language") is a form of communication in Malaysia formed by code-switching among two or more of its many languages as some kind of pidgin (trade language); rojak refers to a local salad which also invokes the meaning of "mixture".

== History ==
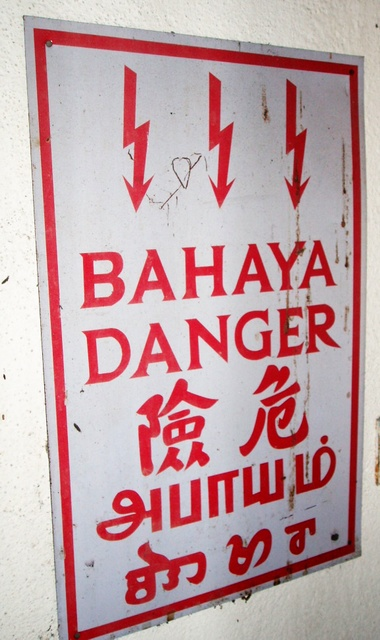
Warning signs at Malaysian electrical substations still use five of the country's most common languages (top to bottom under the high voltage symbol: Malay, English, Chinese (traditional), Tamil, Punjabi).

Rojak language of Malaysia can be traced back to 1402, in the early Malacca of Parameswara, an international port where more than 80 languages from a variety of cultures were spoken. Worldwide traders, settlers, and original dwellers speaking multiple languages in a conversation was common.

According to the Encyclopedia of Malaysia (Languages and Literature), it is a contact language, specifically a pidgin, known in modern Malaysia as rojak language. The uniqueness of rojak language is in its code-switching style. A person who speaks rojak language may begin with standard Malay, continue with English, then mix one or two words in Cantonese garnished with Tamil, and finish with Mandarin Chinese or some fashionable Japanese words. During Parameswara's time, when two groups of traders without a shared language met, they would try many possible languages in order to best understand each other, and the result would be a pidgin or rojak.

In the early 16th century, Portuguese visitor Tome Pires found in Malacca

"Moors from Cairo, Mecca, Aden, Abyssinians, men of Kilwa, Malindi, Ormuz, Parsis, Rumi [Turks living abroad], Turks, Turkomans, Christian Armenians, Gujaratis, men of Chaul, Dabhol, Goa, of the kingdom of Deccan, Malabars and Klings, merchants from Orissa, Ceylon, Bengal, Arakan, Pegu, Siamese, men of Kedah, Malays, men of Penang, Patani, Cambodia, Champa, Cochin China, Chinese, men from Liu Kiu [Formosa] and Brunei, Luzonese, men of Tamjompura, Laue, Bangka, Lingga (and in this area 1000 more Islands are known), from the Moluccas, Banda, Bima, Timor, Madura, Java, Sunda, Palembang, Jambi, Tongkal, Indragiri, Kappatta, Menangkabau, Siak, Arcat, Aru, Bata, from the country of the Tomjano, Pase, Pedir, from the Maldives."

These peoples came to Malacca with ships, and by 1511, Malacca had a population of 50,000 people, including a resident trade community that spoke 84 languages.

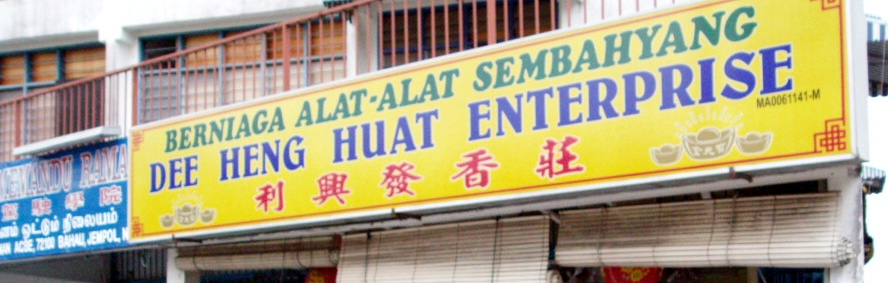
An example of a multilingual signboard in Malaysia

The British brought in large numbers of immigrants from China and India from the late 18th to mid 20th century. The presence of local Malays, Orang Asli, Peranakans, Portuguese settlers, Siamese Thais, newly arrived Chinese and Indians, Sarawakians and Sabahans, as well as the others resulted in the wide use of mixed language.

The P. Ramlee song Dengar Ini Cerita (1953) notably uses Malay-English code-switching as a plot device between its subjects indicating their different social backgrounds.

== Examples ==
- Kau memang terror la! - You're really terrific!
- Tempat makan ni best sangat! - This food court is really cool!
- Nak makan sini ke nak tapau? - Do you want to dine here or take away?
- Jangan susah hati maa, lu punya bos mesti boleh kaw tim punya maa! - Don't worry, your boss can surely compromise!
- Apasal lu buat ini kerja cincai? - Why do you do this task sloppily?

Colloquial and contemporary usage of Malay includes modern Malaysian vocabulary, which may not be familiar to the older generation, such as:

- Awek (means girl, in place of perempuan).
- Balak (means guy, in place of jantan).
- Cun (means pretty, in place of cantik / jelita).

New plural pronouns have also been formed out of the original pronouns popularly nowadays and the word orang (person), such as:

- Korang (kau + orang, the exclusive "us", in place of kalian / kamu semua (or hangpa / ampa in Kedah)).
- Kitorang (kita + orang, the exclusive "we", in place of kami).
- Diorang (dia + orang, the exclusive "they", in place of mereka (or depa in Kedah)).

In addition, Arabic terms that are originally used in Standard Malay nowadays have been popularly changed where some of the words or pronunciations in the involved terms have been added by the local conservative Muslims by disputing the terms suggested by the Dewan Bahasa dan Pustaka (DBP), claiming that the involved terms with implementation of the additional words or pronunciations is the real correct terms as same as stated in the Qur'an, where it is predominantly used by the local Muslim netizens in the social media nowadays. The several involved terms in comparison to Standard Malay that is popularly used, such as:

- Ramadhan (means the holy fasting month, in place of Ramadan).
- Aamiin (means asking Him to verify the prayer (Du'a); real term is Ameen, in place of Amin).
- Fardhu (means obligatory (in Islam), in place of Fardu).
- Redha (means accepting, in place of Reda).
- Mudharat (means harm, in place of Mudarat).
- Dhaif (means poverty, in place of Daif).
- Zohor (means mid-day or noon time, in place of Zuhur).
- Hadith (means Prophet (Mohamed) terms or speeches, in place of Hadis).

=== Jangan lupa diri ===
"Jangan lupa diri" ("Do not forget your roots") is a rallying cry commonly heard among Malaysians interested in protecting their linguistic heritage. This statement suggests that, regardless of race, the Malaysian people have their own roots and ancestral origin to protect. In 2002, Tun Dr. Mahathir proposed that English be 'a tool' to obtain knowledge in the sciences and mathematics, as part of education in Malaysia.

== Controversy ==
Code-switching between English and Malaysian and the use of novel loanwords is widespread, forming Bahasa Rojak. Consequently, this phenomenon has raised the displeasure of linguistic purists in Malaysia, in their effort to uphold use of the prescribed standard language.

Bahasa Rojak is widely used, especially by Malaysian urban youths, which has triggered concerns about continued proficiency in the Malaysian (specifically Malay) and English languages being mixed, and consequent risks to job opportunities for new graduates. The Malaysian government is promoting the use of standard Malay (bahasa Melayu (baku)) since the end of 1980s, especially in the private sector, and discouraging the usage of Bahasa Rojak, similar to the Singapore Government's Speak Good English Movement and its discouragement of the use of the Singlish (Singaporean-English) pidgin. For example, Malaysian TV station TV3 in April 2006 changed the name of its carnival Karnival Sure Heboh to Karnival Jom Heboh as a result of this concern.

Comic magazines are often criticized for using Bahasa Rojak. Words or phrases written in Bahasa Rojak are often printed in boldface to enable readers to identify them. By the end of 2003, Gempak magazine began using a more formal language style and minimizing use of Bahasa Rojak, including the usage of bold lettering for words deemed colloquial.

During the Standard Malay Language Framework Congress held in November 2017, former Malaysian Deputy Prime Minister Ahmad Zahid Hamidi expressed his disappointment at the poor usage of the national language. Despite Malaysia having achieved 60 years of independence, there are still many Malaysians (especially Malays) who could not speak proper Malay despite being born, raised, and educated in Malaysia.

== See also ==
- Rojak
- Manglish
- Singlish
- Malaysian English
- Malay trade and creole languages
