= Bhāṣā =

Word for "language" derived from Sanskrit

Bhāṣā (or one of its derived forms) is the word for "language" in many South and Southeast Asian languages, which derives from the Sanskrit word भाषा bhāṣā meaning "speech" or "spoken language". In transliteration from Sanskrit or Pali, bhasa may also be spelled bhasa, basa, or phasa.

The word Bahasa in English is sometimes used to refer specifically to the Malay language (including Indonesian and Malaysian standards), this standalone usage however is considered incorrect within the language: when referring to other languages, a non-capitalized bahasa ("language") is used preceding a toponym or ethnonym (e.g. bahasa Ingg[e]ris "English", bahasa Italia "Italian"). However, bahasa could also be expanded to refer to any lect from one of a particular region (bahasa daerah) to one only used personally (idiolect, bahasa aku).
