= Malaysian Malay =

Standardized variety of Malay language

- Standard Malay; Bahasa Melayu Baku بهاس ملايو باكو; Bahasa Melayu Piawai بهاس ملايو ڤياواي
- Bahasa Melayu Malaysia بهاس ملايو مليسيا; Bahasa Malaysia بهاس مليسيا
- Pronunciation: [baˈha.sə mə.la.ju mə'lej.sjə],[baˈha.sə mə'lej.sjə]
- Native to: Malaysia, Singapore, Brunei
- Speakers: Native: Few (2022); L2: Spoken by the vast majority of those in Malaysia, although most learn a local Malay dialect or another native language first.
- Language family: Austronesian: Malayo-Polynesian; Malayo-Sumbawan (?); Malayo-Chamic-BSS (?); Malayic; Malay; Malaysian Malay
- Early forms: Proto-Austronesian: Proto-Malayo-Polynesian; Proto-Malayic; Old Malay; Classical Malay (Standard Classical Malay); Pre-Modern Malay (Standard Johor–Riau); Modern Malay (Malaysian language)
- Writing system: Latin (Rumi); Arabic (Jawi); Malaysian Braille
- Signed forms: Manually Coded Malay

Official status
- Official language in: Malaysia; Singapore; Brunei
- Regulated by: Dewan Bahasa dan Pustaka (Malaysian Institute of Language and Literature); Dewan Bahasa dan Pustaka Brunei (Brunei Language and Literature Bureau); Majlis Bahasa Melayu Singapura (Singapore Malay Language Council)

Language codes
- ISO 639-3: zsm
- Glottolog: stan1306
- Linguasphere: 33-AFA-ab
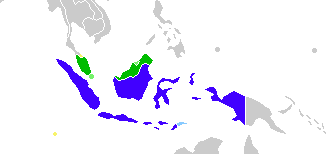
- Countries where Malaysian Malay is spoken: Malaysia Singapore and Brunei, where Standard Malay is an official language Indonesia, where Standard Malay is mutually intelligible with the state language Southern Thailand and Cocos Island, where Standard Malay is minority language

Malaysian Malay (Malay: Bahasa Melayu Malaysia) or Malaysian (Bahasa Malaysia) – endonymically known as Standard Malay (Bahasa Melayu Baku or Bahasa Melayu Piawai) or simply Malay (Bahasa Melayu, abbreviated to BM) – is a standardized form of the Malay language used in Malaysia and also used in Singapore and Brunei (as opposed to the variety used in Indonesia, which is referred to as the "Indonesian" language). Malaysian Malay is standardized from the Johor–Riau dialect of Malay, particularly a branch spoken in the state of Johor south of the Malay Peninsula. It is spoken by much of the Malaysian population, although most learn a vernacular Malay dialect or another native language first.

== Terminology ==
=== In Malaysia ===
Article 152 of Malaysia's Constitution as drafted in 1957 (revised in 1963) merely mentions "Malay" (Bahasa Melayu) as the designation of its "national language" without any further definition, but the term bahasa Malaysia (lit. 'Malaysian language') is used in official contexts from time to time. The latter term was endorsed by Tunku Abdul Rahman during his premiership.

The exact wording of either names above can be politically contentious. Between 1986 during Mahathir Mohamad's tenure and 2007, the term bahasa Malaysia was replaced by "bahasa Melayu"; even in 1999 the Dewan Bahasa dan Pustaka rejected the publication of some short stories as the preface to the publication used the term bahasa Malaysia instead of bahasa Melayu. In 2007, to recognize that Malaysia is composed of many ethnic groups (and not only the ethnic Malays), the term bahasa Malaysia became the government's preferred designation for the national language. The Ministry of Education's official communications used bahasa Malaysia from 2011 to 2015 but has preferred bahasa Melayu in its syllabi as of 2023.

=== Other countries ===
In Singapore, "the Malay language" in the "Roman script" is afforded the status of national language in part 13 of its constitution's general provisions. The term bahasa Melayu is used continuously in Singapore's educational literature and is considered to be identical to Malaysian Malay.

The national standard variety of Malay employed in formal communications of Brunei dubbed "Standard Brunei Malay" (or internally "Standard Malay") is observed to largely follow the Malaysian standard; the main differences being minor variation in pronunciation and some lexical influence from Brunei Malay, the local non-standard vernacular variety of Malay.

== Writing system ==
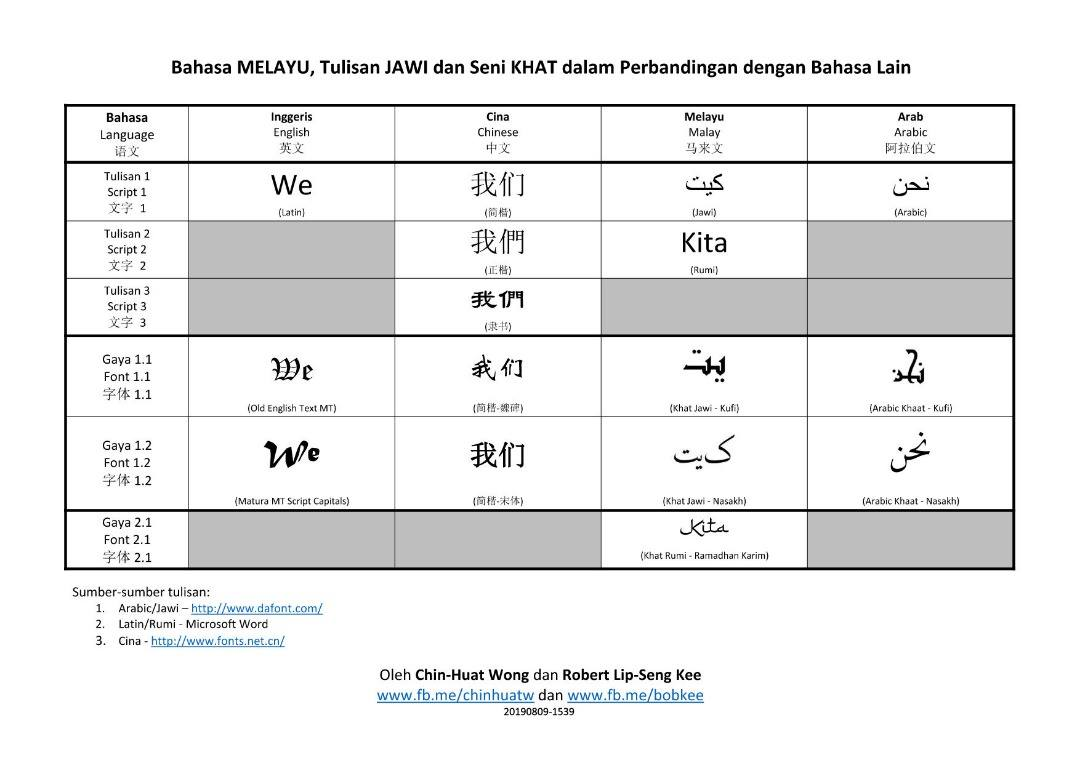
Comparison of the Malay language written in Rumi and Jawi with other languages

The Latin alphabet, known in Malay as Rumi (Roman alphabet), is prescribed by law as the official script of Malaysian Malay, and the Arabic alphabet called Jawi (or Malay script) is not legally prescribed for that purpose. Rumi is official while efforts are currently being undertaken to preserve the Jawi script and to revive its use in Malaysia. The Latin alphabet, however, is still the most commonly used script in Malaysia, for both official and informal purposes.

== Borrowed words ==
While literary Malay throughout the region has mostly absorbed from Sanskrit, Tamil, Hindustani (Hindi–Urdu), Arabic, Persian, Portuguese and Sinitic languages; the variety spoken within British colonies that eventually make up Malaysia following the 1824 Anglo-Dutch Treaty borrowed majorly from English (in particular many scientific and technological terms) compared to Dutch as spread within the East Indies.

Since Malayan independence and later Federation formation, its own Dewan Bahasa dan Pustaka followed a purist approach in lexicography away from Western loanwords (even favouring established roots like Sanskrit and Arabic) as well as neologizing from native roots. In recent years, Malaysian has also been influenced lexically by the Indonesian variety largely through the popularity of neighbouring mass media like dramas, soap operas, and music – akin to the effect of American media towards other Englishes like those of Britain and Australia.

1. Sanskrit: This language had a significant influence on the Malay language through trade and the spread of Hindu-Buddhist religions that arrived in the Malay Archipelago from the 1st to the 14th century. Borrowed words include bahasa (language), raja (king), syurga (heaven), neraka (hell), desa (village).
2. Arabic: With the arrival of Islam in the region during the 7th century, Arabic began influencing the Malay language, especially in religious and philosophical terminology. Examples include kitab (book), masjid (mosque), ilmu (knowledge), iman (faith), zakat (almsgiving).
3. Tamil: The influence of the Tamil language came primarily through maritime trade between India and the Malay Archipelago. Borrowed words from Tamil include kedai (shop), mangga (mango), and vadai (a type of snack).
4. Chinese: Trade relations between Chinese merchants and the local population led to the borrowing of words such as tauhu (tofu), mi (noodles), lombong (mine).
5. Portuguese: The Portuguese occupation of Malacca in the early 16th century introduced words like gereja (church), keju (cheese), jendela (window), sekolah (school), and almari (cupboard).
6. Dutch: Borrowing from Dutch occurred during the Dutch colonial period, including words like kabin (cabin), kontrak (contract).
7. English: The English language introduced many technical and modern words into Malay, especially during British colonial rule. Examples include telefon (telephone), komputer (computer), bank, internet, and stesen (station).

== Colloquial and contemporary usage ==
Colloquial and contemporary usage of Malay includes modern Malaysian vocabulary, which may not be familiar to the older generation, such as:

- Awek (means girl, in place of perempuan).
- Balak (means guy, in place of jantan).
- Cun (means pretty, in place of cantik / jelita).

New plural pronouns have also been formed out of the original pronouns popularly nowadays and the word orang (person), such as:

- Korang (kau + orang, "you all", in place of kalian / kamu semua).
- Kitorang (kita + orang, the exclusive "we", in place of kami).
- Diorang (dia + orang, the exclusive "they", in place of mereka).

Malaysian speaker

In addition, several Arabic-derived terms traditionally used in Standard Malay have, in contemporary usage, undergone popular changes in spelling, pronunciation, and form. These changes are particularly prevalent among conservative Muslim communities, who sometimes reject the terminology recommended by the Dewan Bahasa dan Pustaka (DBP), arguing that the modified forms more accurately reflect the original Arabic terms and their usage in the Qur’an. Consequently, these alternative forms have become increasingly widespread among local Muslim netizens, particularly on social media. Some of the terms commonly used in this manner, in contrast to their Standard Malay equivalents, include:

- Ramadhan (means the holy fasting month, in place of Ramadan).
- Aamiin (means asking Allah (Islam) to verify the prayer (Du'a); real term is Ameen, in place of Amin).
- Fardhu (means obligatory (in Islam), in place of Fardu).
- Redha (means accepting, in place of Reda).
- Mudharat (means harm, in place of Mudarat).
- Dhaif (means poverty, in place of Daif).
- Zohor (means mid-day or noon time, in place of Zuhur).
- Hadith (means Prophet (Mohamed) terms or speeches, in place of Hadis).

Code-switching between English and Malaysian and the use of novel loanwords is widespread, forming Bahasa Rojak. Consequently, this phenomenon has raised the displeasure of linguistic purists in Malaysia, in their effort to uphold use of the prescribed standard language.

== See also ==
- Comparison of Standard Malay and Indonesian
- Indonesian language
- Jawi, an Arabic script based writing system for Malay
- Language politics
- Malaysian English, English language used formally in Malaysia.
