= Rojak =

Southeast Asian fruit and vegetable dish

Rujak
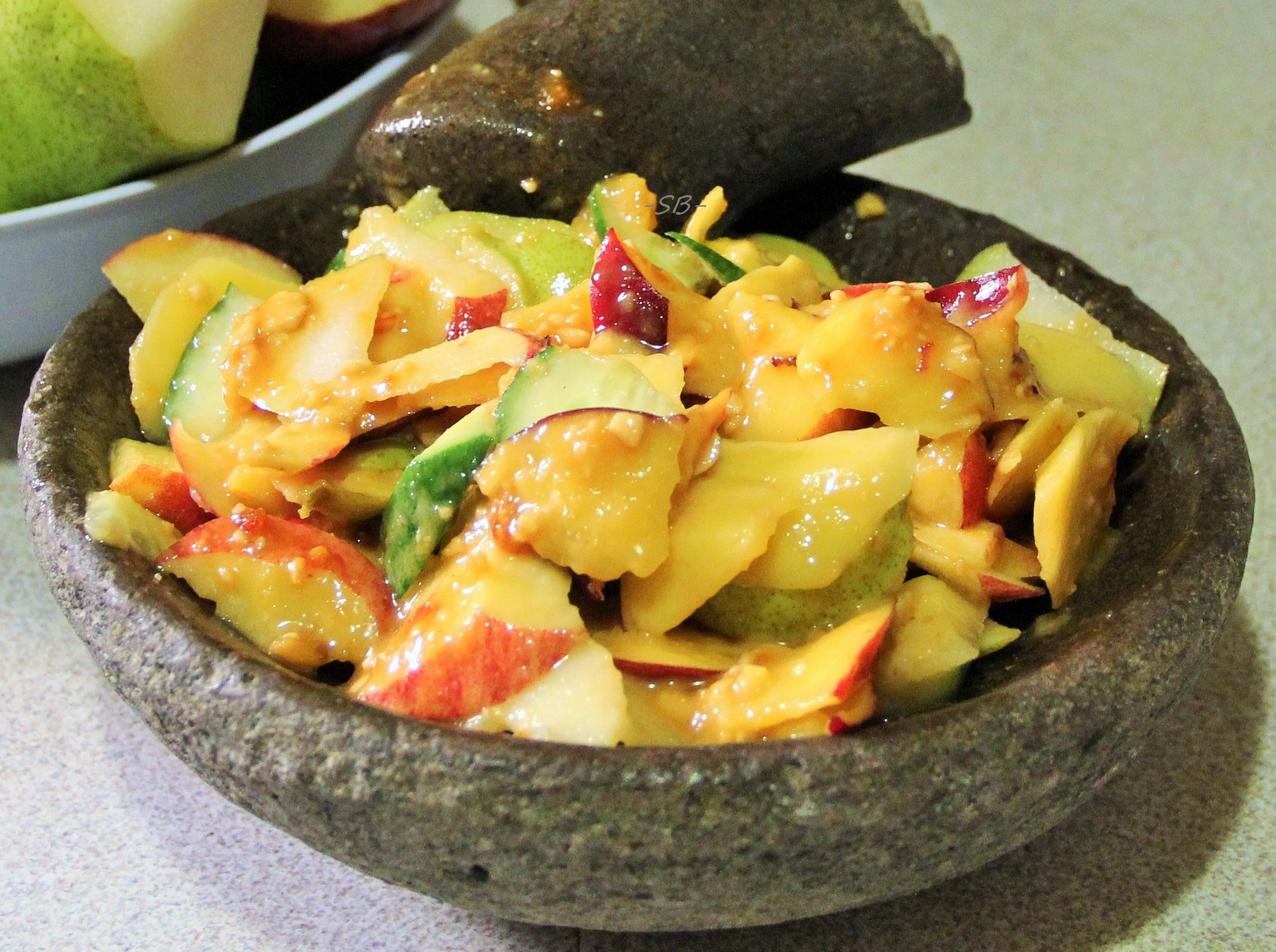
- Rujak in a stone mortar
- Alternative names: Lotis
- Type: Salad
- Region or state: Java, Indonesia
- Associated cuisine: Indonesia, Malaysia, Singapore
- Serving temperature: Fresh, at room temperature
- Main ingredients: Fruits, vegetables, palm sugar, peanuts, chilli dressing

Rojak (Note: in Malaysian and Singapore English, from Malay) or rujak (Javanese: ꦫꦸꦗꦏ꧀) is a salad dish of Javanese origin, commonly found in Indonesia, Malaysia, and Singapore. The most popular variant in all three countries is composed of a mixture of sliced fruit and vegetables and served with a spicy palm sugar dressing.

There is a variety of preparations, especially in cuisine, and rujak is widely available throughout the country. The most common variant is primarily composed of fruits and vegetables, and its sweet and tangy dressing is often made with shrimp paste. Some recipes may contain seafood or meat components, especially in Malaysia and Singapore, where a notable variant shows influence from Indian Muslim cuisine.

== Etymology ==
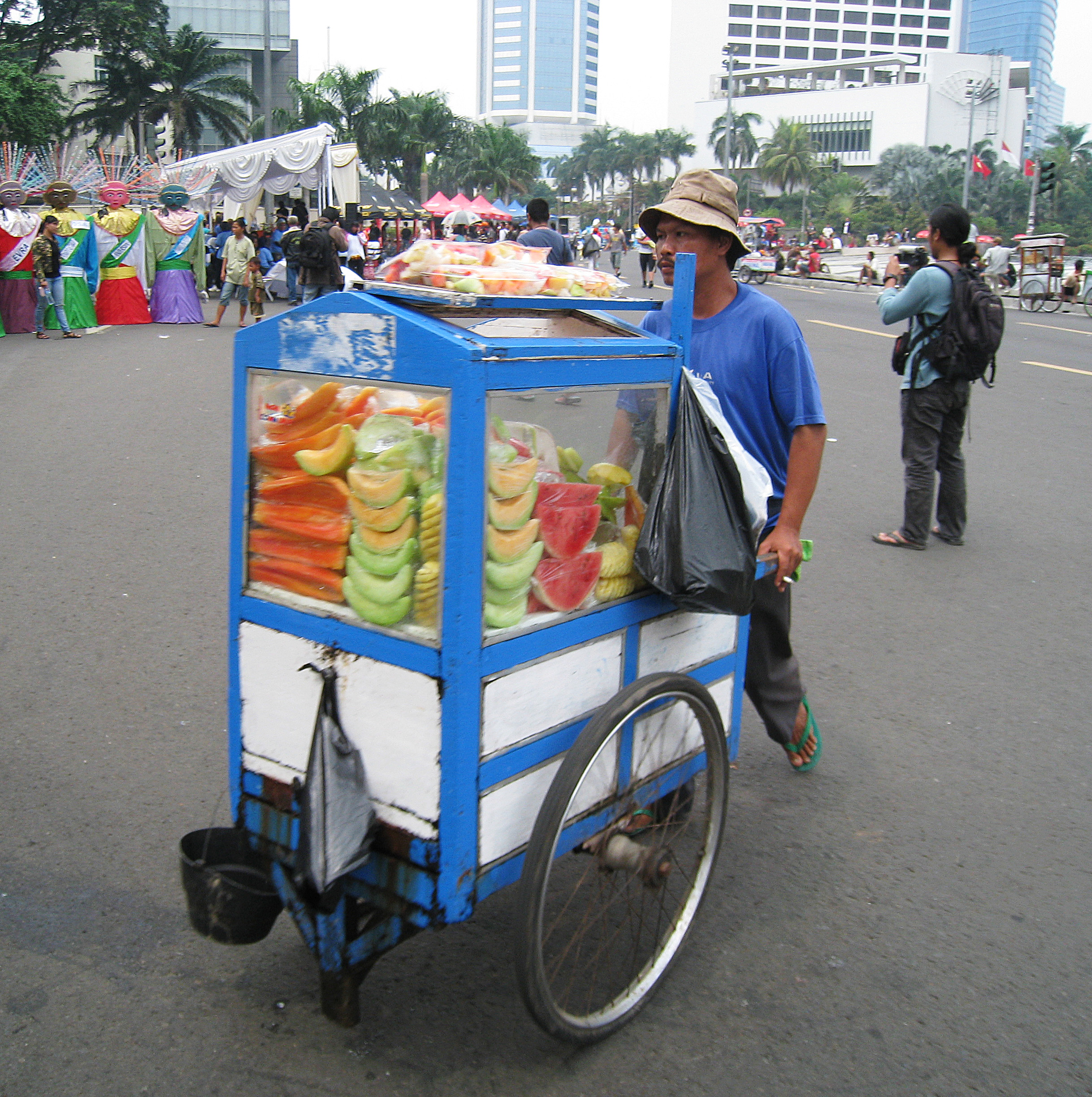
Travelling fruit rujak vendor in Jakarta, Indonesia, 2009

According to the Dutch missionary Petrus Josephus Zoetmulder, the word rujak (ꦫꦸꦗꦏ꧀) comes from Old Javanese anrujak or rinujak, which mean "to chop into little pieces". Alternatively, its origin may be the word rurujak, meaning a mixture of chopped unripe fruit, as attested in the ancient Taji Inscriptions (901 CE) from the era of the Mataram kingdom in Central Java.

The dish was later introduced to other regions and neighboring countries by the Javanese diaspora as well as by Indian migrants from Java. In Malaysia and Singapore, it is spelled "rojak".

== Cultural significance ==
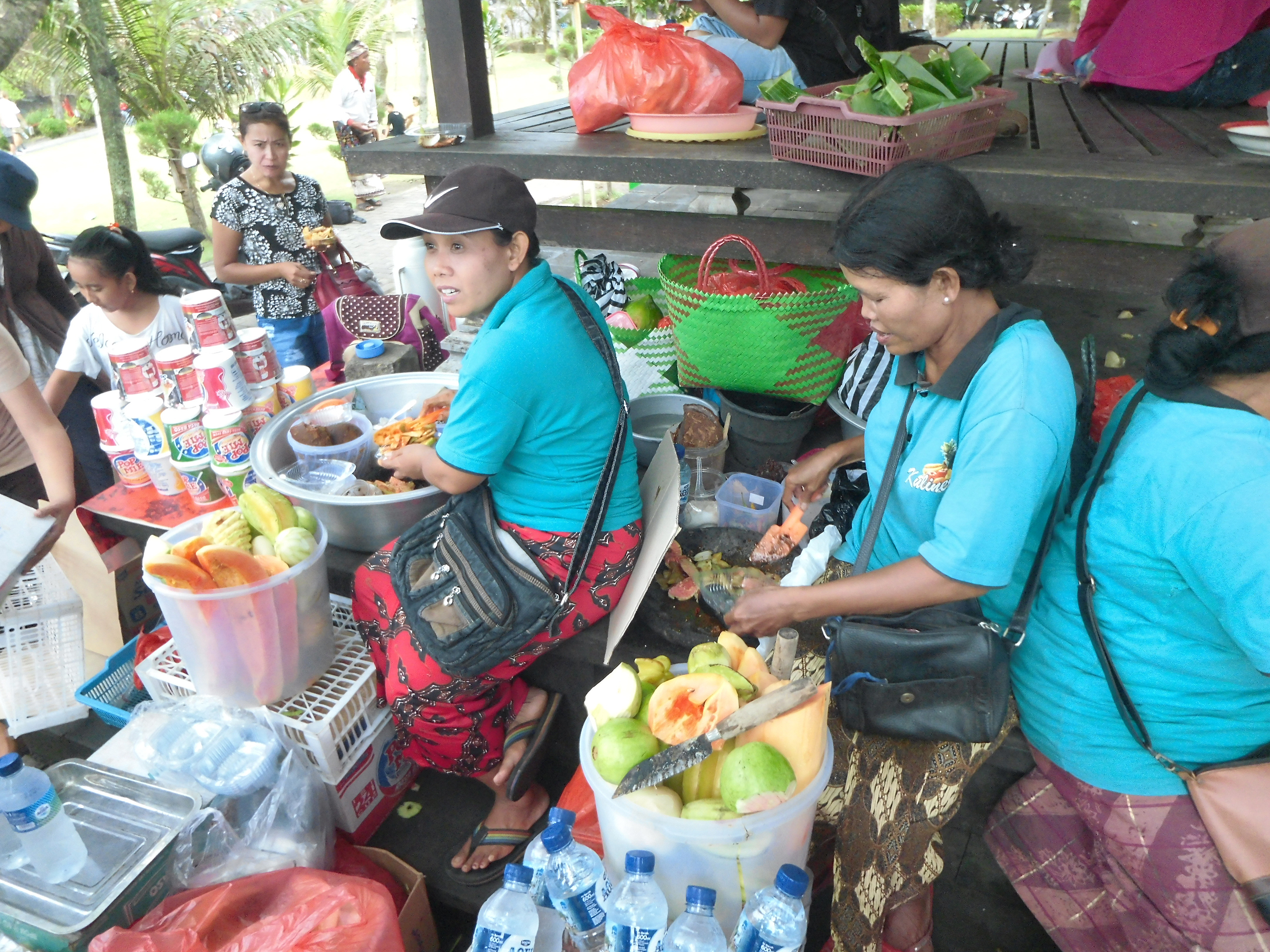
Fruit rujak sellers in Bali, Indonesia

In Indonesia, particularly among the Javanese, the sweet, spicy, and sour tastes of rujak are popular among pregnant women; this craving for unripe mango and other sour-tasting fruits is known as ngidham or nyidham in Javanese. In Javanese culture, rujak is an essential part of the traditional prenatal ceremony called naloni mitoni or tujuh bulanan (literally: "seventh month") and is meant to wish the mother-to-be a safe, smooth, and successful labour. The recipe for this ceremony is similar to typical fruit rujak, with the exceptions that the fruits are roughly shredded instead of thinly sliced, and that jeruk bali (pomelo/pink grapefruit) is an essential ingredient. Javanese people believe that if the rujak tastes sweet, the child will be a girl, and if it is spicy, it will be a boy.

Mangarabar, or rujak-making, is a special event for the Batak and Mandailing people of Tapanuli, North Sumatra, following a harvest, with entire villages getting involved.

In Malaysia and Singapore, "rojak" is also used as a colloquial expression for an eclectic mix, in particular as a word describing the multiethnic character of the two societies.

== Indonesian rujak ==
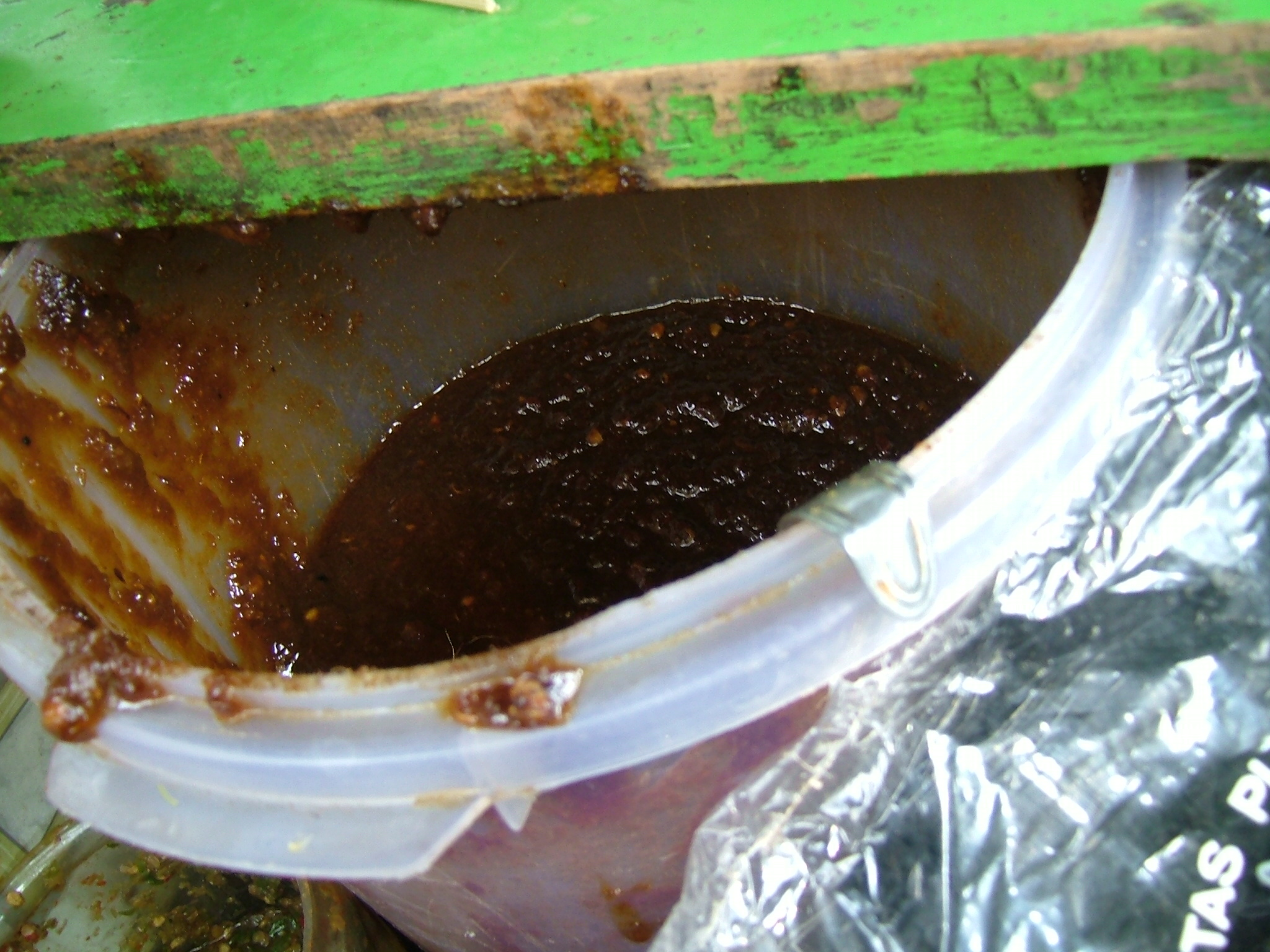
Sweet rujak sauce made of palm sugar, tamarind, peanuts, and chilli

=== Rujak buah (fruit rujak) ===
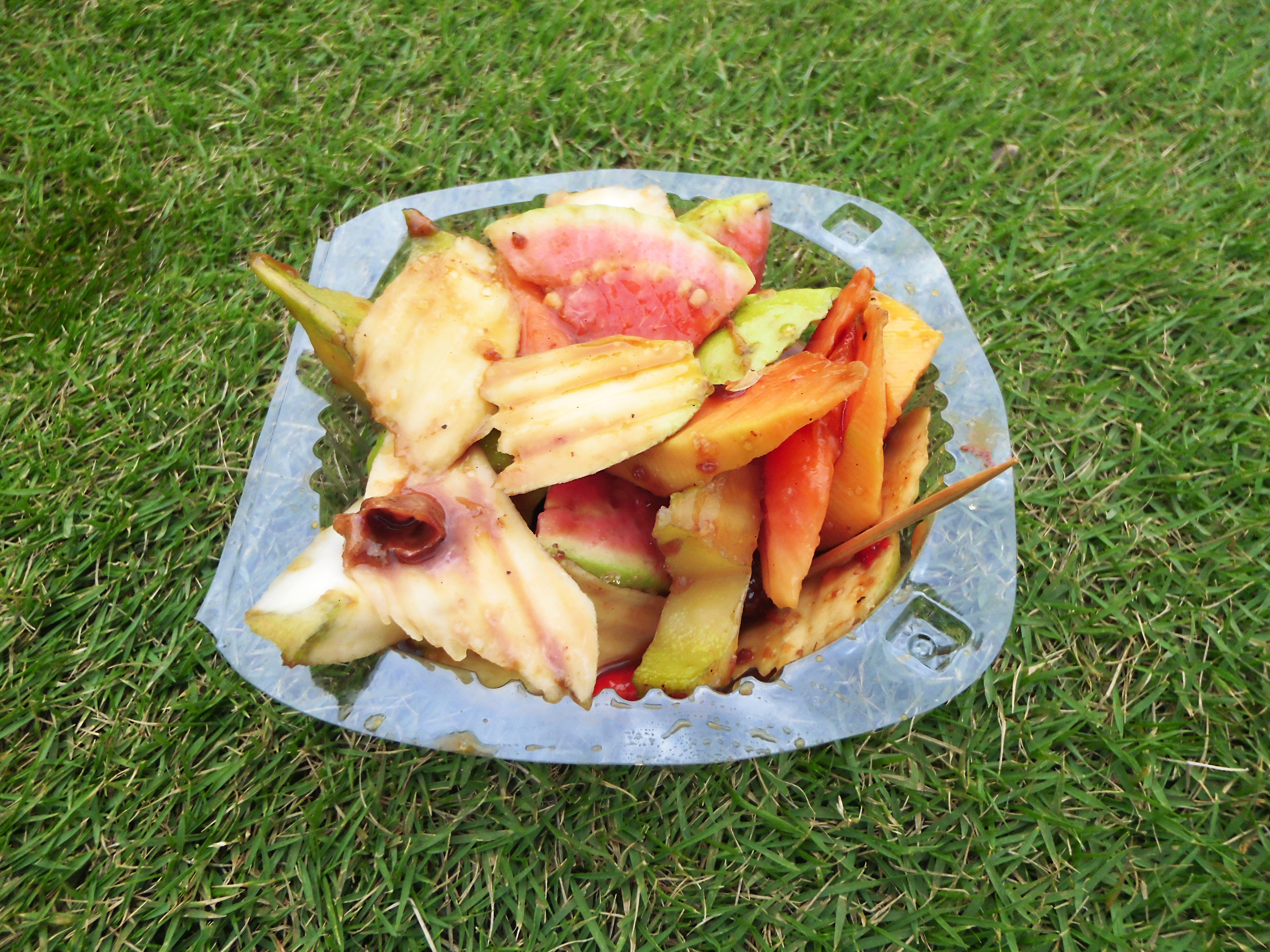
Seasonal fruit rujak in Indonesia

In Indonesia, rujak buah is also known as rujak manis (sweet rujak). The typical Indonesian fruit rujak consists of slices of assorted tropical fruits, such as water apple, pineapple, unripe mango, jícama, cucumber, kedondong, and sweet potato. Sometimes, variants of green apple, bilimbi, and pomelo are added. The sweet and spicy rujak dressing is made of water, palm sugar, tamarind, crushed peanuts, shrimp paste (known locally as petis), salt, and bird's eye chili.

The fruits are cut into bite-sized pieces, and the dressing is poured on top. An addition of sambal garam powder (a mixture of salt and ground red chilli) is offered on the side for a saltier flavor. Javanese people call this version of rujak lotis.

=== Rujak Bagan ===
Rujak bagan is a typical dish of Bagansiapiapi, Riau, locally known as lolia. It consists of pineapple, prawn fritters, cucumber, and bean sprouts.

=== Rujak bakso ===
Rujak bakso, or bakso rujak, is a fusion dish between rujak and bakso. In Malang, the dish is made using a mixture of noodles, water spinach, menjes, tofu, and meatballs, sprinkled with seasoning made from peanuts, chilies, and petis, and doused with bakso soup. In East Jakarta, bakso rujak is made with cucumber, mango, kedondong, jícama, guava, papaya, pineapple, and starfruit. The fruits are cut into pieces and doused in bakso and rujak sauce.

=== Rujak belut ===
In Brebes, a version of rujak called rujak belut is common, consisting of fried eel smeared with sambal and served with fresh chopped shallot and tomato.

=== Rujak bulung ===
Rujak bulung is a traditional dish from Bali containing seaweed mixed with fish sauce, grated coconut, grated galangal, and seasoning made from salt, sugar, chili peppers, and shrimp paste.

=== Rujak cingur ===
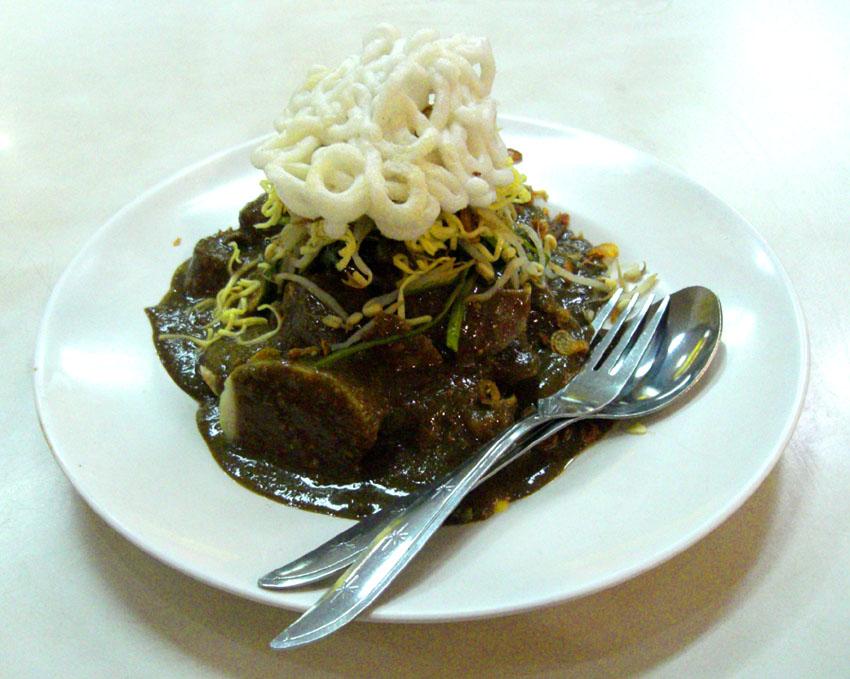
Rujak cingur, containing buffalo lips, is a speciality of Surabaya.

Cingur (pronounced "ching-ur") literally means "mouth" in Javanese. This variant of rujak originates from Surabaya and has a meaty taste, as it contains slices of cooked buffalo or cow lips, jícama, unripe mango, pineapple, cucumber, kangkung (water spinach), lontong rice cake, tofu, and tempeh, all served in a black petis sauce, and crushed peanuts. It is topped with a sprinkle of fried shallots and krupuk prawn crackers.

=== Rujak corek ===
This version of rujak is made from a hollowed-out cucumber filled with a petis sauce.

=== Rujak cuka ===
Rujak cuka literally means "vinegar rujak". It is a speciality of Sundanese cuisine of West Java, noted for its sourness. It is made of shredded fruits such as pineapple and unripe mango, and vegetables such as jícama, cabbage, bean sprouts, and cucumber. It is similar to asinan, due to its sour and spicy dressing, since both dishes contain vinegar, palm sugar, and chilli.

=== Rujak ebi ===
Rujak ebi is a fruit rujak containing ebi (dried shrimp) and emping crackers. It is a delicacy of Singkawang, West Kalimantan.

=== Rujak es krim ===
A specialty dessert from Yogyakarta, this dish consists of fruit rujak and coconut ice cream, served with sambal.

=== Rujak gamel ===
Rujak gamel is a specialty rujak of Gamel village in Cirebon Regency, West Java. It consists of noodles, boiled water spinach, cabbage, tofu, fritter, eggplant, and wet krupuk.

=== Rujak gobet ===
Rujak gobet is usually served on special occasions such as the telonan or tingkepan celebrations of pregnant women. Various types of fruits, such as jícama, pineapple, starfruit, and guava are included, but especially young jackfruit, locally known as babal.

=== Rujak juhi ===
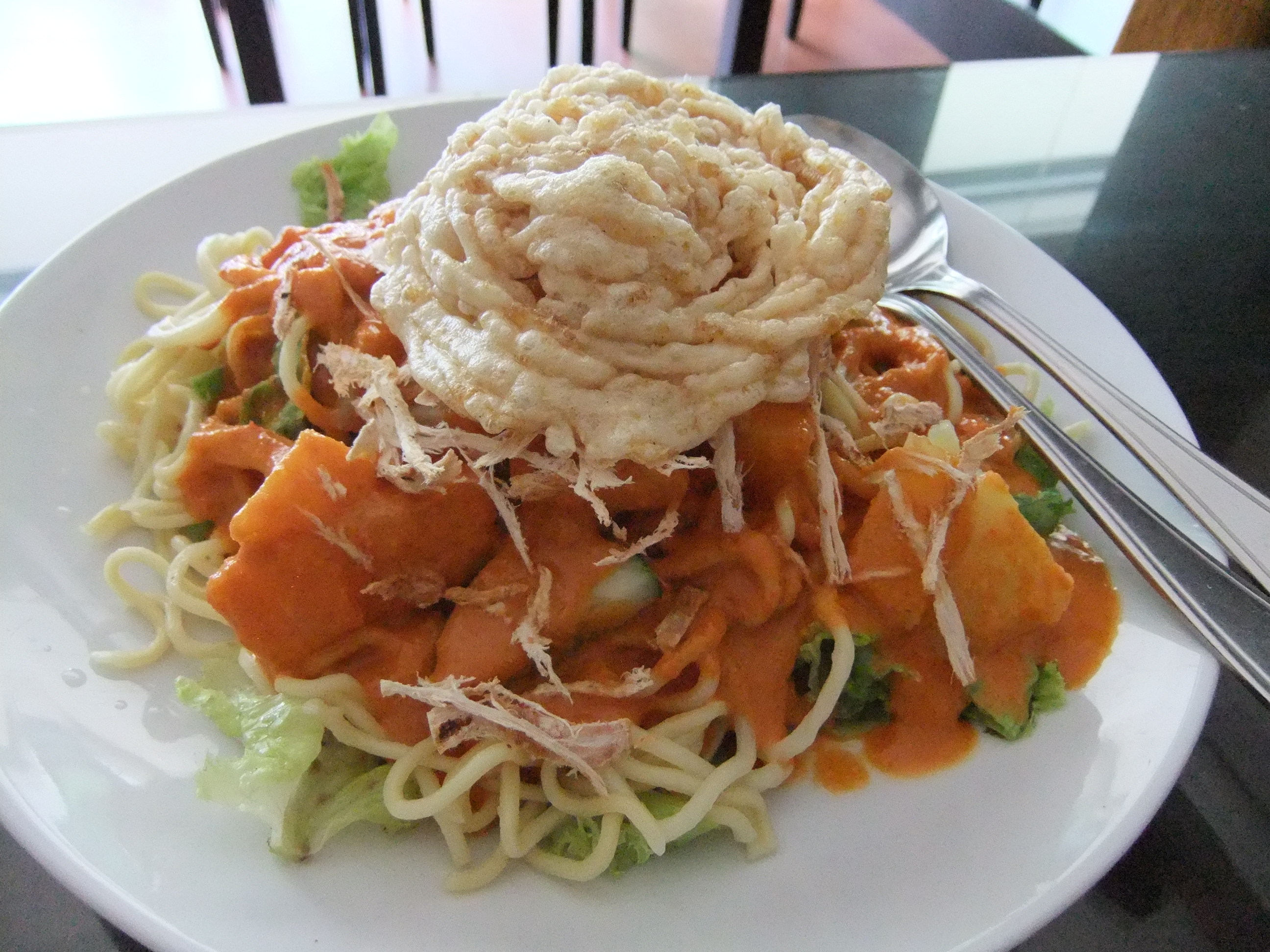
Rujak juhi, with krupuk

Juhi means salted cuttlefish in Indonesian. This variety of rujak contains fried tofu, fried boiled potatoes, fried shredded salted cuttlefish, cucumber, noodles, lettuce, cabbage, peanut sauce, vinegar, chilli, and fried garlic. It originates from the Chinese community in Batavia (now Jakarta).

=== Rujak kambang ===
Rujak kambang consists of rice vermicelli, cucumber, unripe mango, unripe papaya, as well as other fruit, seasoned with a thin sauce consisting of fish broth and petis as well as salt and vinegar.

=== Rujak kangkung ===
Rujak kangkung is made from water spinach, sweet spicy sambal, and krupuk. It is a delicacy from Kuningan, West Java.

=== Rujak kembang katis ===
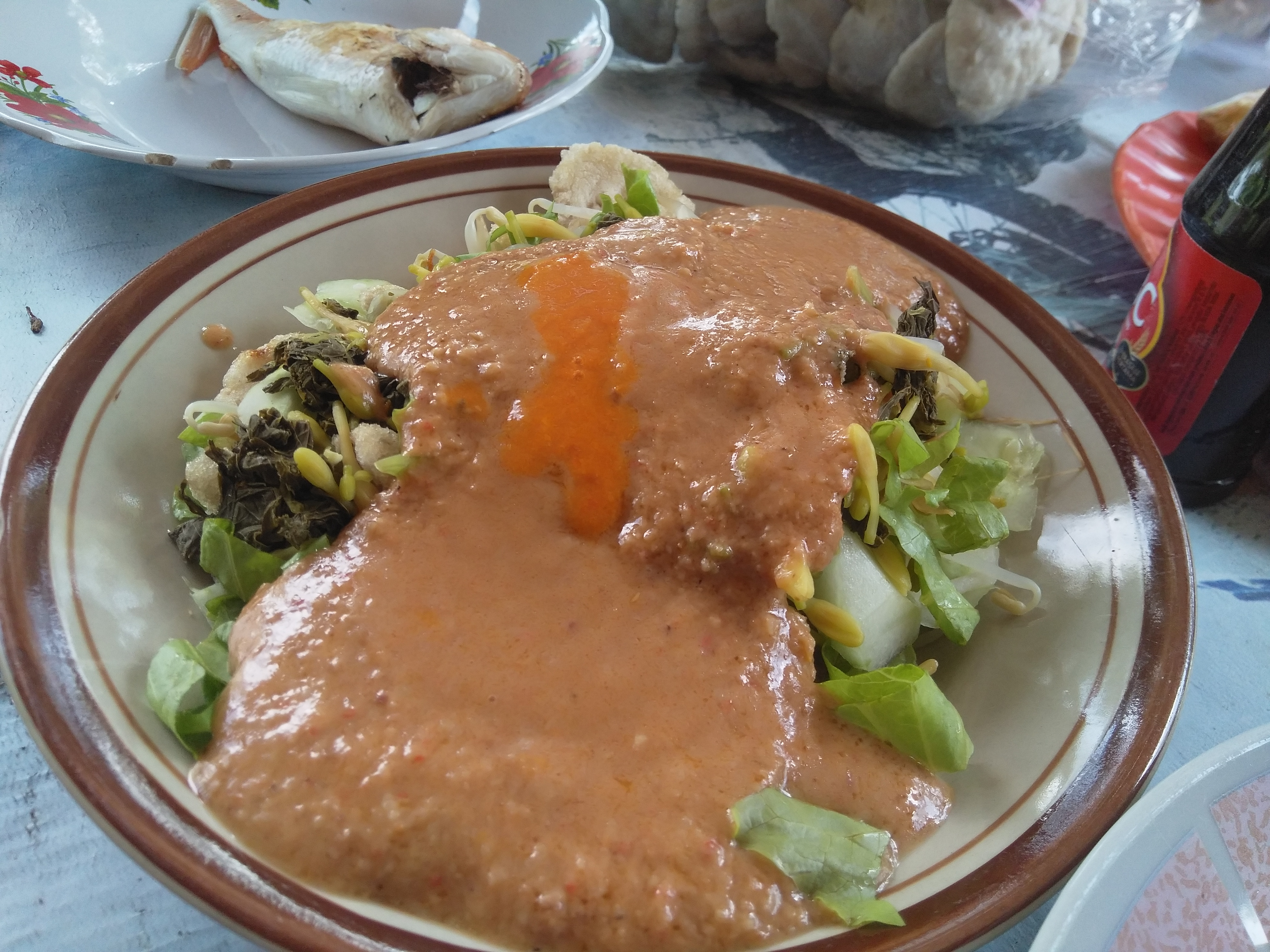
Rujak kembang katis

Rujak kembang katis, or rujak bunga pepaya, originates from Bangka Island. It consists of cassava leaves and papaya flowers as well as other vegetables, together with peanut sauce.

=== Rujak kuah pindang ===
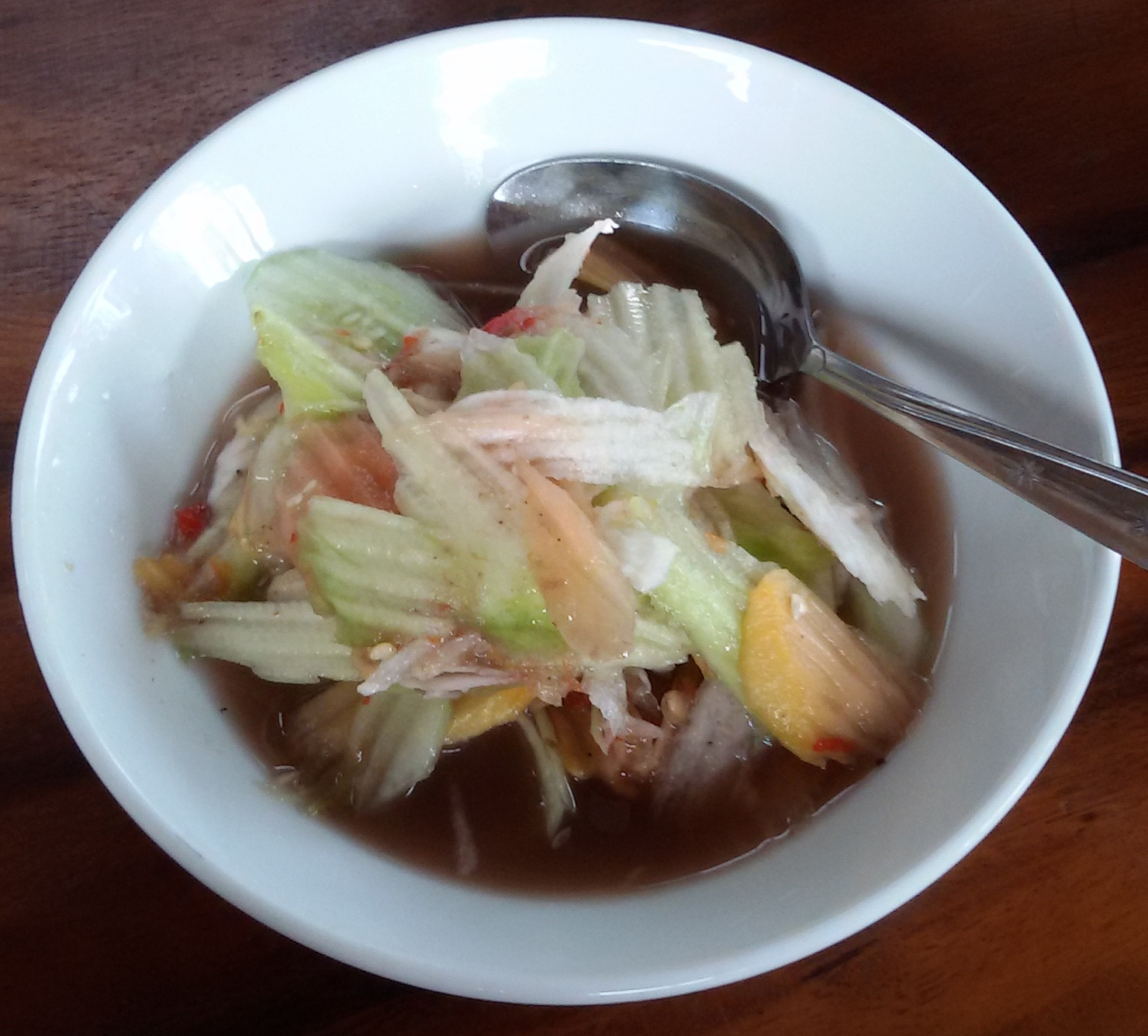
Rujak kuah pindang uses thin, sweet, and spicy sauce made of pindang fish brine broth.

Rujak kuah pindang is a popular street food in Bali, where instead of the normal dressing, the fruits are soaked in a spiced fish broth, which consists of terasi shrimp paste, salt, bird's eye chilli, red chilli, and pindang fish broth.

=== Rujak kucur ===
Commonly found in Cirebon, West Java, this dish, whose name means "to pour", is made with peanut sauce and spicy sour sauce. It includes water spinach, cucumber, bean sprouts, asparagus beans, cabbage, different types of noodles, bitter melon, and papaya leaves.

=== Rujak mie ===
Rujak mie is a dish from Palembang, consisting of noodles, tofu, slices of pempek, cucumber, lettuce, and sweet spicy broth.

=== Rujak Natsepa ===
Taken from the name of the beach where the dish is sold, in Ambon, Maluku, this rujak is made with various fruits and vegetables, including rose apples, mangos, pineapples, starfruit, cucumbers, and sweet potatoes, as well as nutmeg and tomi-tomi. The topping sauce is made with coarsely ground fried peanuts and palm sugar.

=== Rujak pengantin ===
Pengantin means "bride-and-groom pair" in Indonesian. This variant of rujak contains slices of boiled eggs, potatoes, fried tofu, pineapple, carrot, bean sprouts, pickles, chilli, lettuce, cabbage, cucumber, emping crackers, roasted peanuts, peanut sauce, and vinegar.

=== Rujak petis ===
Another variant from Surabaya and Ponorogo Regency, rujak petis contains slices of jícama, unripe mango, cucumber, water spinach, kedondong, tofu, and soybean sprouts, all served in a black petis sauce, fried shallots, salt, palm sugar, unripe banana, and crushed peanuts.

=== Rujak selingkuh ===
Rujak selingkuh, which originates in Sumenep, Madura, contains a mix of fruits with peanut sauce and soto soup, to which are added vegetables, rice vermicelli, and lontong.

=== Rujak serut ===
Literally meaning "shaved rujak", rujak serut consists of similar ingredients as standard rujak buah, with the difference being that the fruits are not cut into bite-sized pieces but shredded into a roughly grated consistency.

=== Rujak Shanghai ===
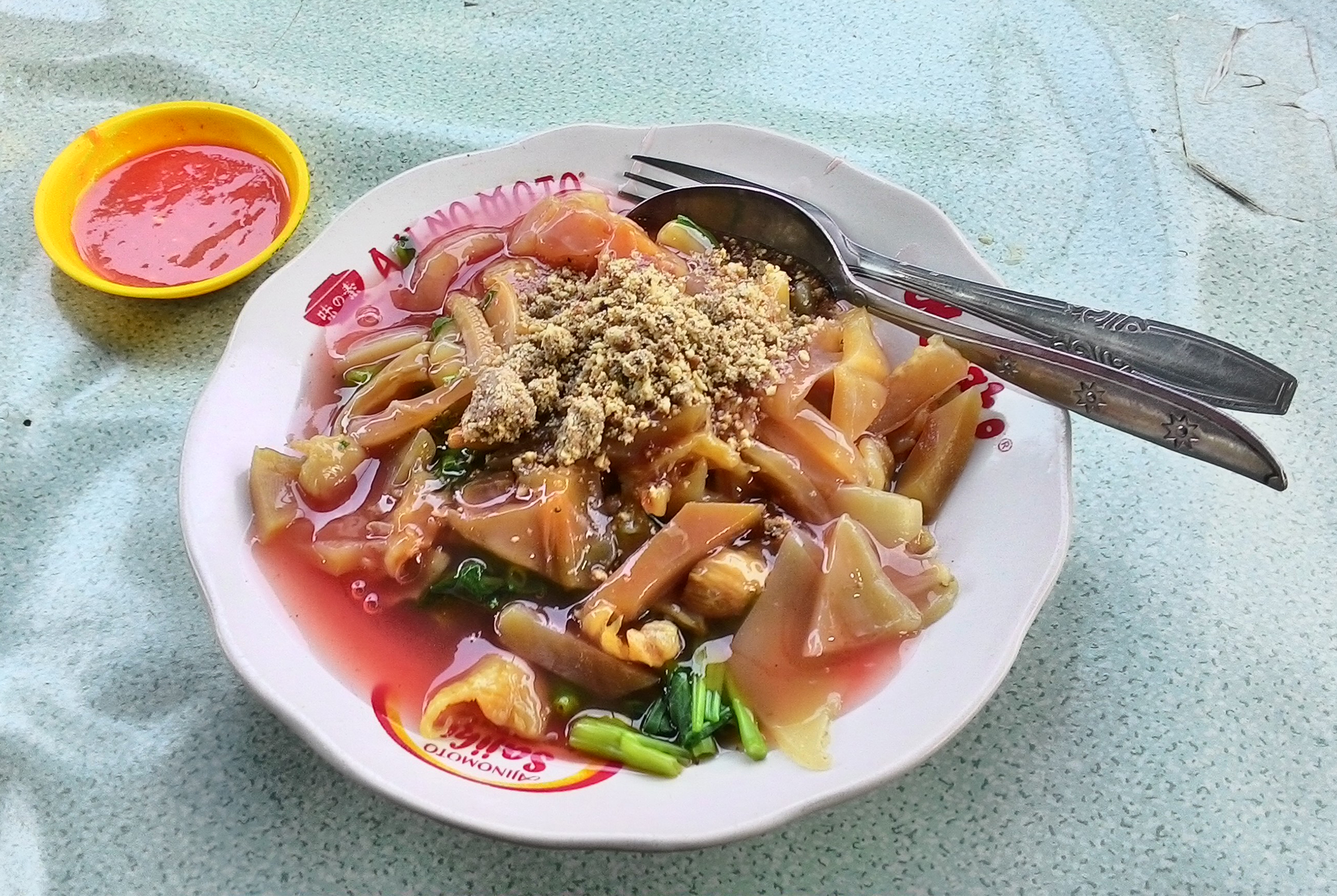
Rujak Shanghai served in the Glodok Chinatown area of Jakarta

This version of rujak was created by Indonesia's Chinese community in Kota Tua Jakarta. It contains seafood, boiled sliced octopus, jellyfish, and water spinach, and is served with thick red sweet and sour sauce, mixed with pineapple juice and toasted crushed peanuts. Chilli sauce and pickled jícama are often served as condiments.

=== Rujak siwil ===
A rujak dish from Madura, siwil is made from wheat flour, tapioca flour, garlic, and spices. Generally, siwil dough will be put into long plastic tubes and boiled first. It can additionally be fried with flour or simply cut and served with rujak seasoning made of a fish petis sauce.

=== Rujak soto ===
A dish from Banyuwangi, East Java, this is a blend of beef soto and rujak cingur, in which the vegetables (water spinach and bean sprouts) are served with lontong in a petis sauce poured over soto soup.

=== Rujak tahu ===
Rujak tahu is a variant of rujak that contains tofu and was created in Majalengka Regency in the 1970s. The sauce combines vinegar, sambal, and sweet soy sauce.

=== Rujak teplak ===
In Tegal Regency, rujak teplak is a common variety of rujak consisting of vegetables such as water spinach, cabbage, bean sprouts, asparagus beans, papaya leaves, cassava leaves, and banana blossoms, smeared with spicy sauce made from chilli, peanuts, and cassava. The dish is served with a noodle cracker called kerupuk mie.

=== Rujak terasi ===
This version of rujak is from Lombok and consists of slices of fruits such as mango, june plum, pineapple, and papaya, mixed with sambal containing roasted shrimp paste.

=== Rujak tolet ===
Also from Surabaya, rujak tolet includes fried tofu, fried garlic, and optionally, beef tendons. The sauce is petis-based, mixed with palm sugar, slices of raw bird's eye chilli, and sweet soy sauce.

=== Rujak tumbuk (rujak bēbēk) ===
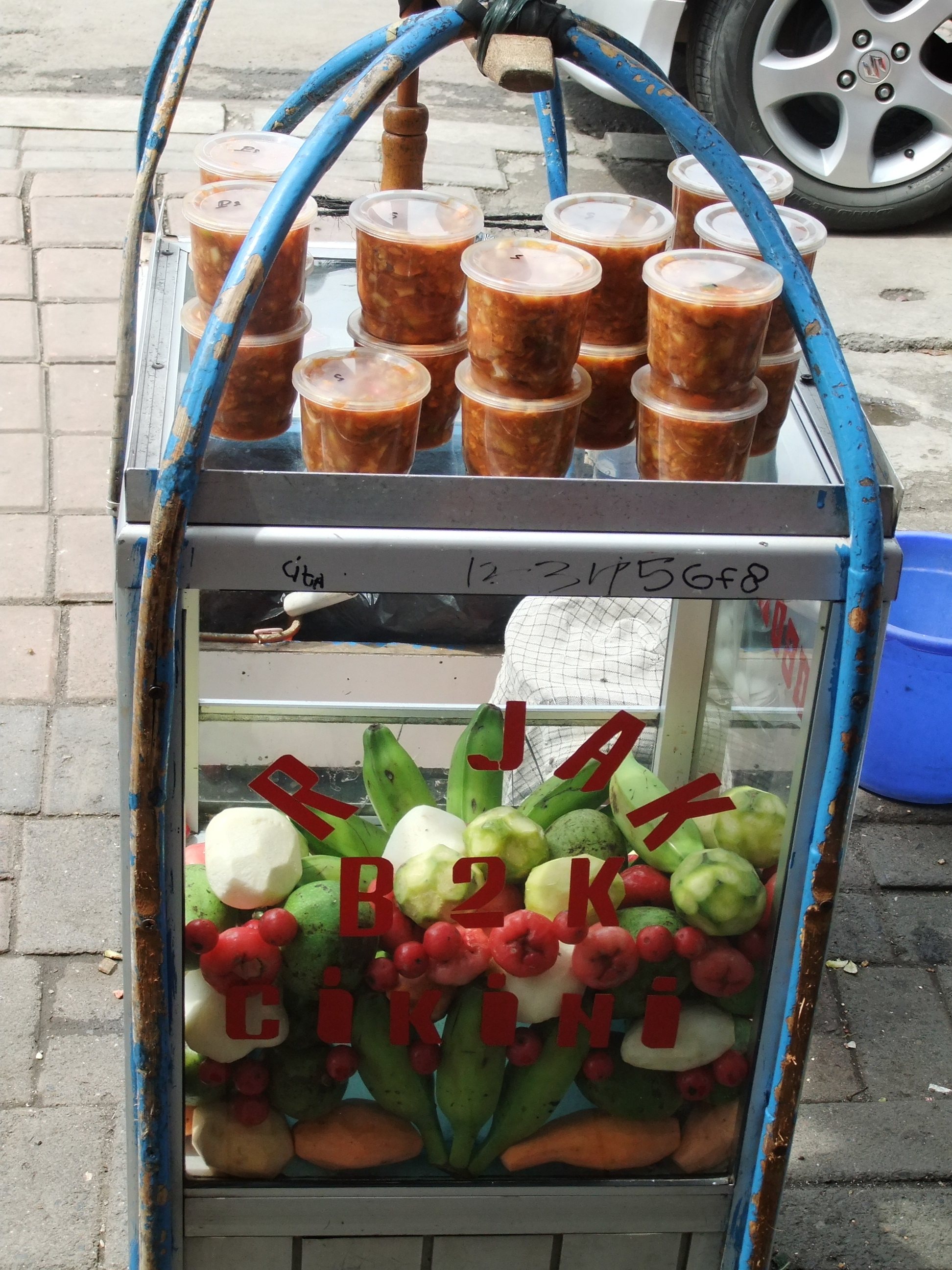
Rujak bebek, or rujak tumbuk (mashed rujak)

This is another variant of Indonesian fruit rujak, from West Java. The ingredients are almost the same, except that they are ground or mashed together (tumbuk or bēbēk in Indonesian) in a wooden mortar. The fruits include green plantain, raw red yam, jícama, apple, kedondong, and unripe mango. The dressing is not poured on the fruit but mixed in. Traditionally, rujak tumbuk was served on banana leaf plates called pincuk, though nowadays, it is more often served in plastic cups.

=== Rujak u' groeh ===
A delicacy from Aceh province, this rujak consists of very young and tender coconut meat, young (green) papaya, bird's eye chili, sugar, palm sugar, ice, salt, and a dash of lime.

== Malaysian and Singaporean rojak ==
=== Rojak buah ===
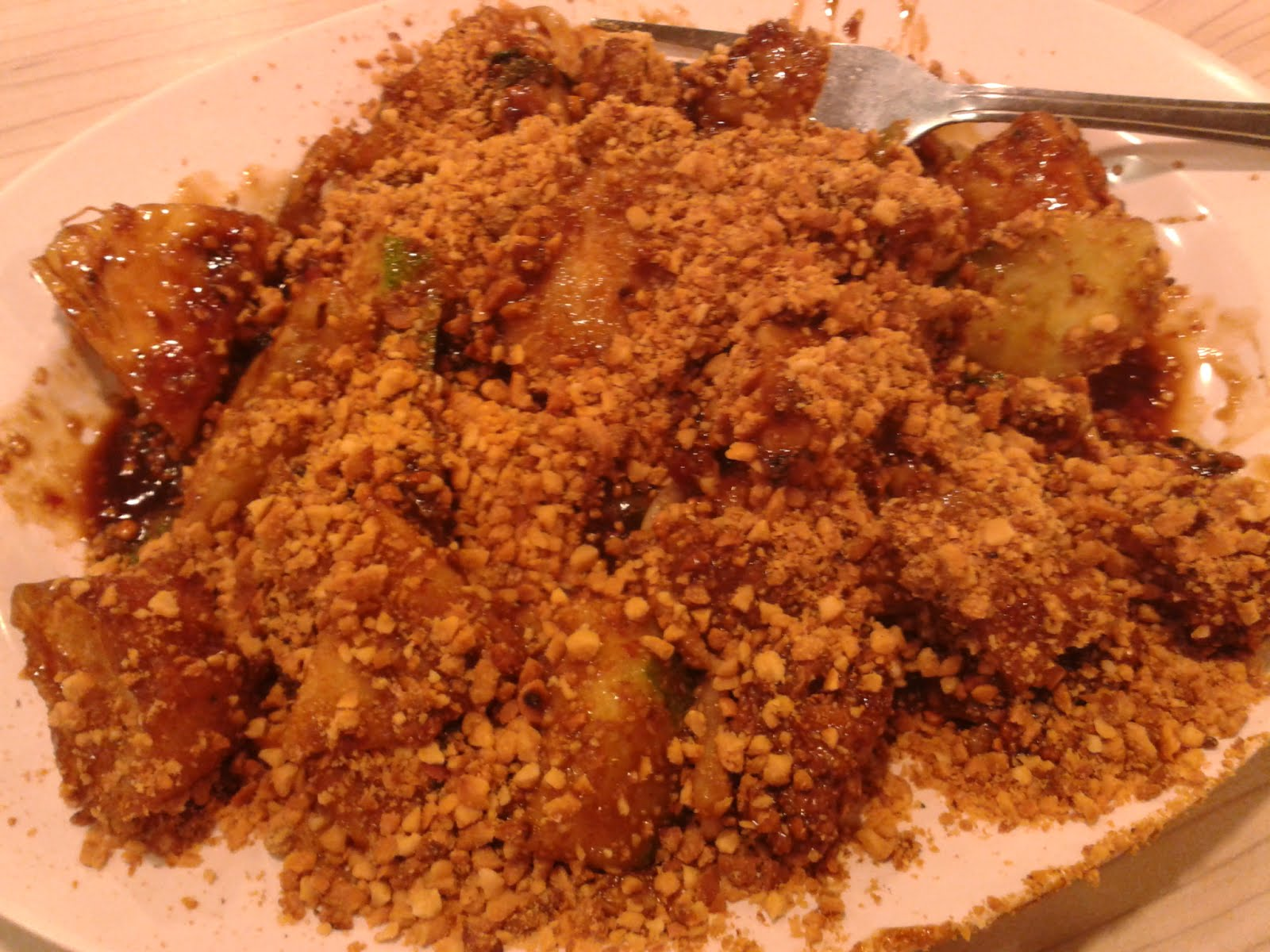
Fruit rojak in Singapore

In Malaysia and Singapore, fruit rojak typically consists of cucumber, pineapple, jícama, bean sprouts, taupok (puffy, deep-fried tofu) and cut-up youtiao (Chinese-style fritters). The dressing is made of water, shrimp paste, sugar, chilli, and lime juice. Ingredients vary among vendors, with some adding tamarind or black bean paste to the mix. The ingredients are cut into bite-sized portions and tossed in a bowl with the dressing, and topped with crushed peanuts and a dash of ground or sliced torch ginger.

A popular variant found in Penang, Malaysia, is rojak Penang, which adds water apple, guava, squid fritters, and honey to the mixture, and emphasizes the use of tart fruits such as unripe mangoes and green apples, while bean sprouts and fried tofu puffs are usually omitted. The dressing tends to be very thick, with an almost toffee-like consistency.

=== Rojak India ===
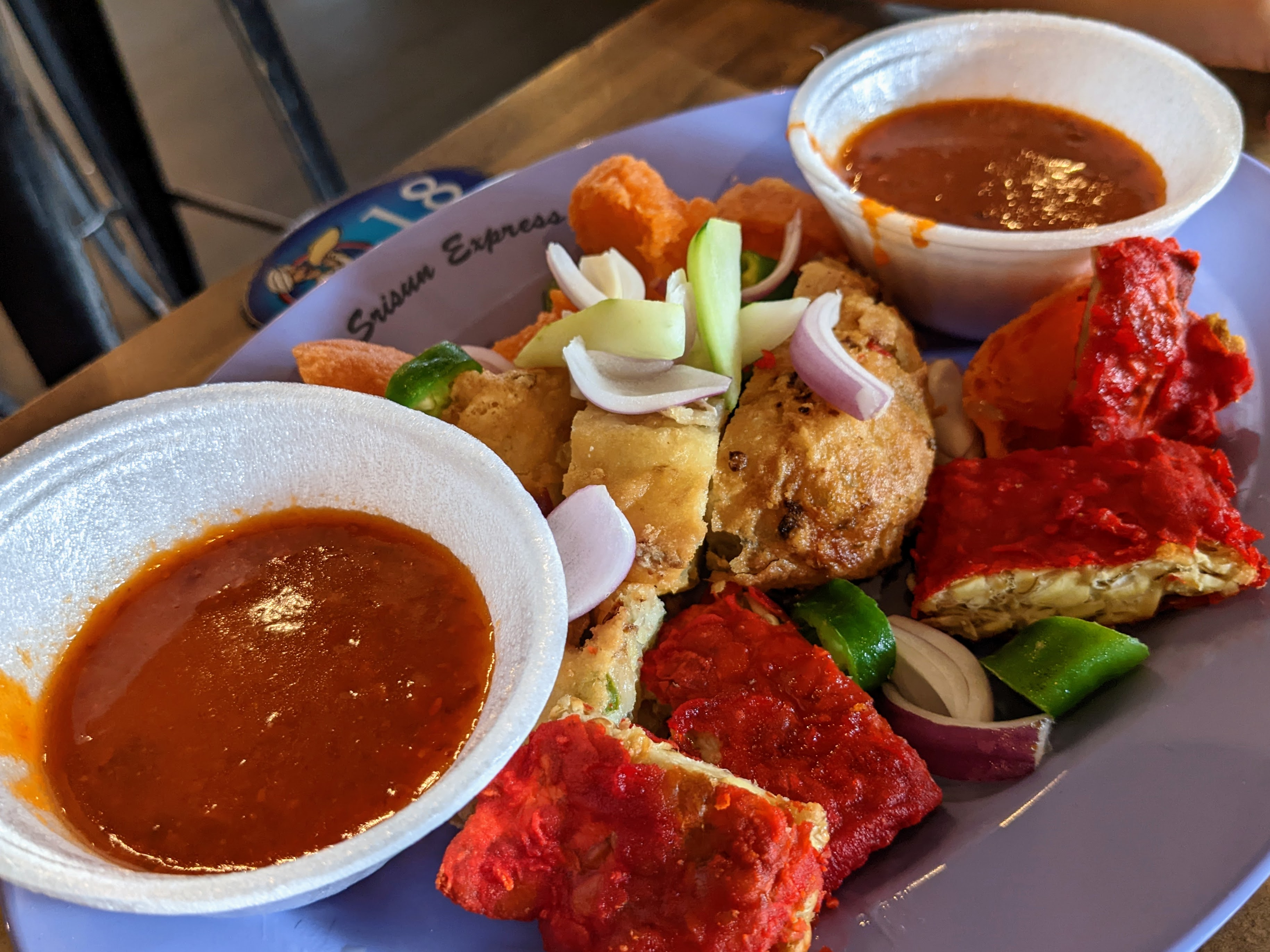
Indian (mamak) rojak in Singapore

In Malaysia, mamak rojak (also known as Indian rojak, or pasembur) is associated with mamak stalls, which are Malaysian Indian Muslim food stalls. The dish contains fried dough fritters, tofu, boiled potatoes, prawn fritters, hard-boiled eggs, bean sprouts, cuttlefish, and cucumber, mixed with a sweet, thick, spicy peanut sauce. In the northwestern states of Peninsular Malaysia, such as Penang, and Kedah, it is always called pasembur, while in Kuala Lumpur, it is called rojak mamak.

In Singapore, Indian rojak consists of an assortment of potatoes, hard-boiled eggs, tofu, and prawn fritters, often colorfully dyed. Customers typically select their favorite items from a display, after which they are heated up in a wok, chopped up, and served with a sweet and spicy peanut and chilli sauce on the side for dipping.

=== Rojak bandung ===
A Singaporean dish known as rojak bandung contains cuttlefish, water spinach, cucumber, tofu, peanuts, chilli, and sauce. Rojak bandung has no relation to the Indonesian city of Bandung; in the Malay language, the term bandung means "pairs".

=== Rojak sotong ===
Rojak sotong contains cuttlefish or squid, with peanut sauce.

== Dishes with rojak seasoning ==
=== Indonesia ===
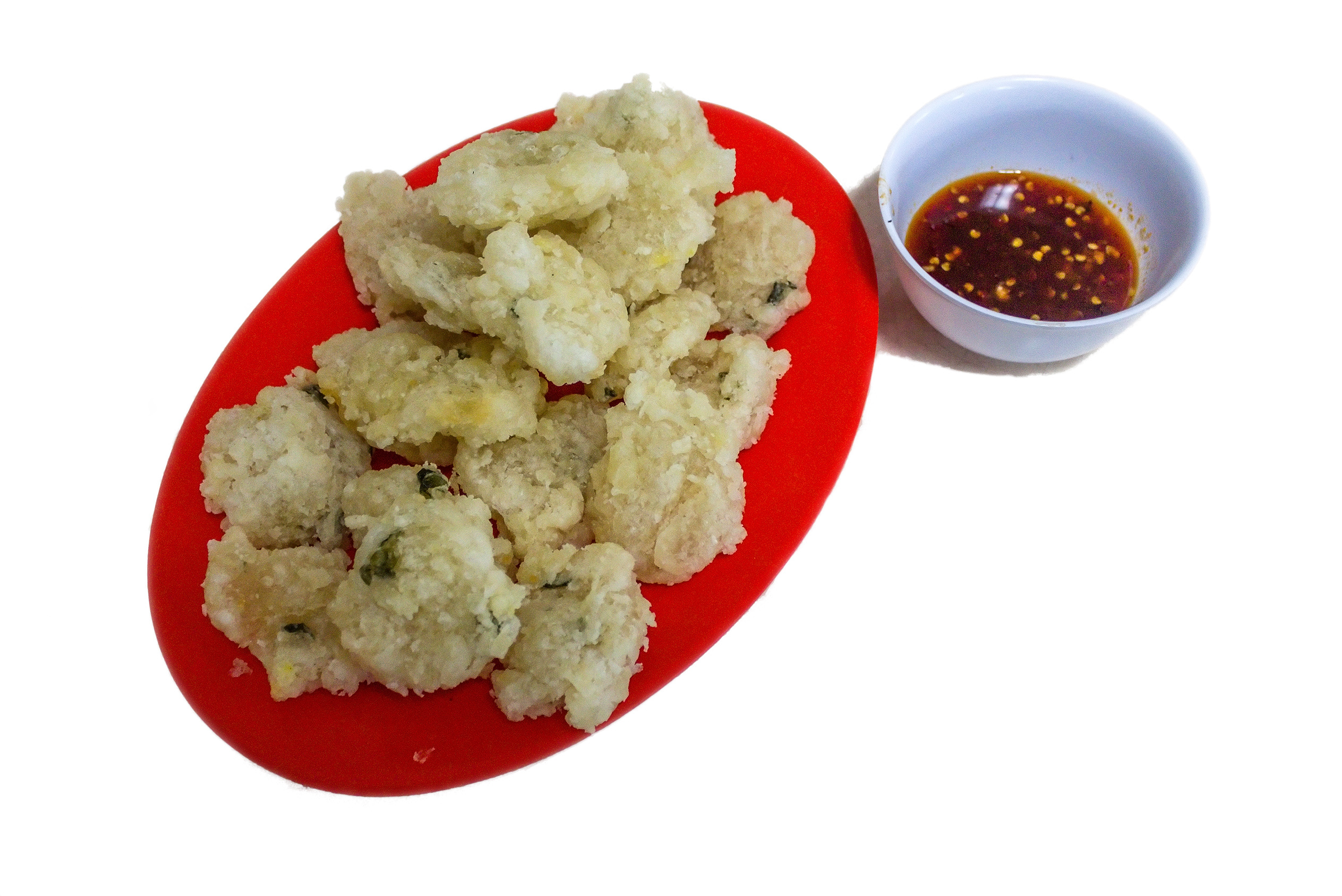
Cireng bumbu rujak

- Ayam bumbu rujak – a chicken dish with rujak seasoning that includes chili and brown sugar
- Cireng bumbu rujak – a deep-fried tapioca snack served with rujak seasoning sauce.

== See also ==
- List of fruit dishes
- List of salads
- Mamuang nampla wan – Thai snack
- Pecel – Indonesian vegetable dish
- Bahasa Rojak – Pidgin language of Malaysia
