= Mamuang nampla wan =

Thai snack

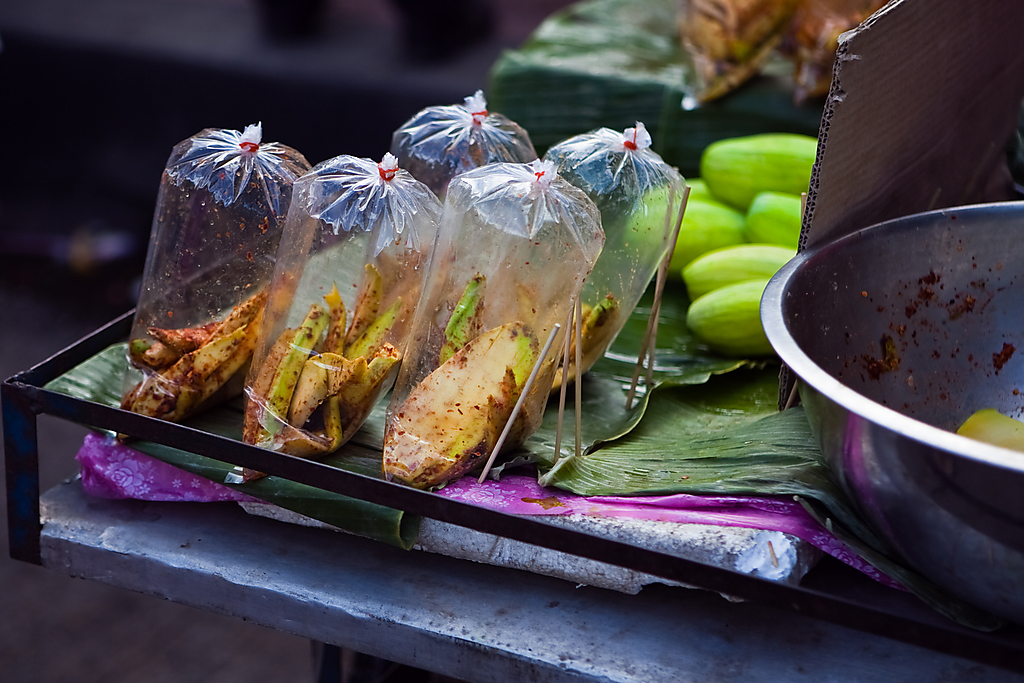
- Mamuang nampla wan at a street vendor in Bangkok, Thailand
- Type: Snack, side dish, finger food
- Place of origin: Thailand
- Region or state: Southeast Asia
- Created by: Thai people

Mamuang nampla wan (Thai: มะม่วงน้ำปลาหวาน, pronounced [mā.mûa̯ŋ nám.plāː wǎːn]; means 'mangoes with sweetened fish sauce') is a Thai snack.

== Overview ==
Mamuang nampla wan is a classic Thai dish which is a combination of unripe mangoes and a sticky dipping sauce. In Thai, mamuang means 'mango', and nampla wan means 'sweetened fish sauce'. This snack has been available for many decades. It was designated as a One Tambon One Product (OTOP) product for the promotion and marketing of the local produce of sub-districts (tambon) in Thailand and became popular throughout the country. Nampla wan can be bought anywhere around Bangkok especially in markets. It can be mixed with other kind of fruit such as pineapple and granny smith apples.

== Popularity ==
Nampla wan is one of the six things that Thai people like to eat with fruits. Although it is popular in Thailand, this dish is not yet well known in other countries. Unlike in Thailand, unripe mangoes are not generally available in the United States. In Thailand during March 2018, Mamuang nampla wan was very popularized due to the TV drama Bubphe Sanniwat (บุพเพสันนิวาส) on Channel 3, by Karakade (การะเกด) the protagonist plays by Ranee "Bella" Campen eats it in drama.

For notable Mamuang Nampla wan shops in Bangkok such as Yaowarat neighborhood and Soi Lalai Sap (Silom 5 alley) in Silom neighborhood or Soi Sena Nikhom 115 (Sena Nikhom 115 alley) in Lat Phrao neighborhood.

== Taste ==
Mamuang nampla wan combines various flavours: the sweetness derives from palm sugar, saltiness from fish sauce, spiciness from chili pepper, and sourness from unripe mangoes.

== See also ==
- Rojak
