= British and Malaysian English differences =

This article outlines the differences between Malaysian English, Malaysian Colloquial English (Manglish) and British English, which for the purposes of this article is assumed to be the form of English spoken in south east England, used by the British Government, the BBC and widely understood in other parts of the United Kingdom.

Malaysian English (MyE), formally known as Malaysian Standard English (MySE), is a form of English used and spoken in Malaysia as a second language. Malaysian English should not be confused with Malaysian Colloquial English, which is famously known as Manglish, a portmanteau of the word Malay and English, or Street English.

Manglish can be likened to an English-based pidgin language or a patois and it is usually barely understandable to most speakers of English outside Malaysia except in the case of Singapore where a similar colloquial form of English is spoken known as Singlish. Though very similar, Manglish today receives more Malay influences while Singlish more Chinese.

== Spelling ==
Manglish does not possess a standard written form, although many variations exist for transcribing certain words. For most purposes it is a spoken tongue.

In Malaysian education, written English is based on British English but most of the students speak in a local accent influenced by American pronunciations.

== Grammar ==
Much of Manglish grammatical structure is taken from varieties of Chinese and the Malay language. For example, the phrase "Why you so like that one?" means "Why are you behaving in that way" in standard English. In Cantonese, a similar phrase would be rendered as "Dímgáai néih gám ge?" or literally "Why you like that?" The "one" in the sample phrase does not literally mean the numeral one, instead it is used more as a suffix device. It is also sometimes rendered as "wan." The use of Manglish is discouraged at schools, where only Malaysian English is taught.

Other common characteristics are anastrophe and omission of certain prepositions and articles. For example, "I haven't seen you in a long time" becomes "Long time never seen you already".

== Vocabulary ==
=== Words only used in British English ===
To a large extent, standard Malaysian English is descended from British English, largely due to the country's colonisation by Britain beginning from the 18th century. But because of influence from American mass media, particularly in the form of television programmes and movies, Malaysians are also usually familiar with many American English words. For instance, both lift/elevator and lorry/truck are understood, although the British form is preferred. Only in some very limited cases is the American English form more widespread, e.g. chips instead of crisps, fries instead of chips.

=== Words or phrases only used in Malaysian English ===
Malaysian English is gradually forming its own vocabulary, these words come from a variety of influences. Typically, for words or phrases that are based on other English words, the Malaysian English speaker may be unaware that the word or phrase is not present in British or American English.

Malaysian	British / American
Handphone (often abbreviated to HP)	Mobile phone or Cell phone
Brinjal	Aubergine/Eggplant
KIV (keep in view)	Kept on file, held for further consideration
Outstation	Means both "out of town" and/or "overseas/abroad".
Where got?	Really? (I don't think so.)
MC (medical certificate). Often used in this context, e.g. 'He is on MC today'	Sick note
Can	Yes/Alright/Able
Cannot	No/No, I can't/Unable
One hundred over, one thousand over etc.	Over one hundred, over one thousand etc.
Meh/Ke An optional suffix usually used to donate a question mark to yes, as in "yeah meh?" or "ye ke?" i.e. "Are you sure?", with the former being more commonly used amongst those of Chinese descent and the latter by Malays.	No equivalent.
Mar Mostly used as a suffix. Derived from Chinese. For example, a person would say "I didn't know mar"; which somewhat has the same meaning as "I didn't know la" but is softer than "la". When the person says "I didn't know mar", it indirectly states that the person is being apologetic about not knowing something.	No equivalent.
Ar An optional suffix usually used to donate a question mark, as in "Sure ar?" or "Are you sure ar?", i.e. "Are you sure?"	No equivalent.
Lah/La A popular suffix to phrases and sentences. Originates from both Malay and Chinese where its usage is grammatically correct, for instance, (Cantonese) "M hou gam yeung la" would literally mean "Don't be like that", except that there is an extra word at the end, "la". Another example: "cannot, lah", i.e."Sorry that's not possible." and "Rest some more-lah.", i.e. "Please rest for a while longer". The tone of which the prefix is spoken greatly affects the context of the statement. Example, saying "Okay -lah" while squinting one eye and hesitating the -lah, would be to give a mediocre opinion about something (as in "The food was okay-lah"). Meanwhile, to say a short increasing pitched -lah as in "Okay -lah. We'll all go to Ipoh later", would be to agree about something. "Lah" is also generally used to soften an otherwise angry/stern tone, such as: "Stop it lah" as opposed to just an abrupt "Stop it!", or "Don't be like that la" as opposed to "Don't be like that". It is usually perceived as less insulting when a "lah" is added in sentences such as those, and typically means that the person uttering the sentence is not angry, unless of course, it is said in a harsh tone.	No equivalent.
Gostan To reverse, especially in the context of driving motor vehicles. A contraction of the term "go astern" (Mostly used in states of Penang and Kedah).	To reverse, to go backwards
Share Market	Stock Market
Remisier	Stockbroker
Bushfire	Wildfire

=== Different meanings ===
This is a list of words and phrases that have one meaning in British English and another in Malaysian English.

Word / Phrase	American / British meaning	Malaysian meaning
@	short for 'at'	an indicator that the name following is a nickname or alias, usually used by Chinese, e.g. for Tan Siew Khoon @ Jimmy, his nickname/alias is Jimmy. However, with the increased use of e-mail in recent years, especially in urban and demographically younger areas, the primary meaning of the symbol is now the same as in British/American English.
last time	on the previous occurrence	previously (often used instead of "used to", for example: "Last time I was a manager" when the meaning is "I used to be a manager")
photostat	a historical copying machine using a camera and photographic paper, which was superseded by the photocopier. See Photostat machine.	a photocopier; also used as a verb meaning "to photocopy"
an alphabet	a set of letters used in a language	a letter of the alphabet, e.g. "The word 'table' has five alphabets." / "The Number is 1, The Alphabet is A"
bungalow	A small house or cottage usually having a single storey and sometimes an additional attic story that is free standing, i.e. not conjoined with another unit.	A mansion for the rich and/or famous; or a fully detached house, regardless of the number of floors it has. Some housing developers also use terms such as "semi-detached bungalow".
to follow	to go directly after e.g. "John is driving; follow him", means go in your own car, behind John's car	to go with, accompany e.g. to go with John in his car.
to send	to direct someone somewhere without accompanying them e.g. a principal sending a student home.	to give someone a lift e.g. sending someone to the airport.
half-past-six	6:30	of low quality
thousand one	one thousand and one hundred, 1100. Likewise, "thousand two" and "thousand three" also means "one thousand two hundred", "one thousand three hundred", and so on.	one thousand and one, 1001

== Pronunciation ==
In Malaysian English, the last syllable of a word is sometimes not pronounced with the strength that it would be in British English.

Also, p and f are sometimes pronounced somewhat similarly among speakers of Malay descent. For example, the two Malay names 'Fazlin' and 'Pazlin' may sound almost identical when spoken by Malays, whereas this confusion would not arise when spoken by a British Speaker.

== See also ==
- Malaysian English
- Regional accents of English speakers
