= Covert prestige =

Sociolinguistic phenomenon

In sociolinguistics, covert prestige is the high social prestige with which certain nonstandard languages or dialects are regarded within a speech community, though usually only by their own speakers. This is in contrast to the typical case of standard varieties holding widespread and often consciously acknowledged high prestige—that is, overt prestige—within a speech community.

The concept of covert prestige was first introduced by linguist William Labov, when he observed speakers preferring to use a nonstandard dialect, even though the speakers considered that dialect to be inferior. Labov proposed an explanation for the continued usage of the nonstandard dialect: to form a sense of group identity in informal speech situations.

== Background ==
The concept of covert prestige was pioneered by the linguist William Labov, in his study of New York City English speakers. While high linguistic prestige is usually associated with standard forms of language, Labov proposed that a similar concept could apply to informal, working-class speech. He observed that speakers of non-standard dialects were aware that their dialect was considered 'inferior' relative to the standard. He attempted to identify the reason for the continued usage of the non-standard dialects even with this awareness: that is, to create and/or maintain group identity within the speech community.

Fellow linguist Peter Trudgill elaborated on Labov's findings in his study of English speakers in Norwich, stating that "covert prestige reflects the value system of our society, and of the different sub-cultures within this society". He also introduced a gendered aspect to covert prestige with his findings, where he found male speakers to be more favourably disposed towards non-standard, working class speech varieties, more concerned with achieving group solidarity rather than wanting to achieve or sound as of a high status, with the opposite case for the female speakers surveyed.

A further example of the gendered aspect of covert prestige is shown in how fraternity men in an American college readily adopted the nonstandard "-in" ending over the prestigious "-ing" to be associated with the "working class behavioural traits of being hardworking and casual".

Sociolinguist Annette Boudreau's analyses of Acadian French similarly posit a language ideology which embraces elements of stigmatized vernacular French (idéologie du dialecte), in response to an ideology valuing Standard French (idéologie du standard).

== Causes ==
Covert prestige is caused by the social traits associated with non-standard languages or dialects, such as lightheartedness, honesty, etc. Through their association with socially valued aspects of essentialized and hyperbolic notions of minority dialect speakers, minority languages can gain a special type of limited cultural currency. The non-standard variety of language may not carry the institutionally endorsed prestige of the standard variety, but for many speakers it carries important social connotations of identity and community.

For example, Caribbean newspaper columnists use the low-variety local creole language to make their opinions more convincing by implying that it is shared by the masses. In such a case, although newspaper editorials are considered a formal domain, the use of the low variety language, which is commonly associated with locals, suggests that the article written by the columnist is a representation of the public's opinions.

In some instances, the low variety language is seen as a symbol of regional identity as it is the indigenous language, giving it a form of covert prestige. Thus, the choice to use the low variety language as opposed to the high variety language can be seen as an indicator of community membership and pride of association with local culture. Research conducted in Paraguay showed that although Spanish is the high-variety "official" language and is dominant in administrative and educational settings, the use of Guarani, the low-variety language, has actually increased from the 1960s to the early 2000s. The surveys conducted show that the low-variety language is valued among both rural and urban speakers. This indicates that people felt that Paraguayans should be able to speak Guarani as it is an authenticating factor. In fact, presidents in Paraguay are able to speak Guarani and use it to gather political support, showing the positive local attitudes towards the low-variety language.

== Features ==
=== Phonetics ===
==== Scottish Standard English varieties ====
Scottish Standard English (SSE) itself encompasses wide linguistic variation and is often described as an accent continuum: at one end are the typically "Scottish-sounding" speakers, hereby referred to as "Scots-SSE" speakers, who use a high proportion of traditional Scottish phonological features, and at the other end of the spectrum are those who more closely emulate Southern Standard British English, through the use of more anglicised features than Scottish, and who are hereby referred to as speakers of "Anglo-SSE".

Research thus far has yet to show any compelling evidence that either Anglo-SSE or Scots-SSE is perceived as Scotland's most prestigious speech variety – instead, they seem to compete with each other as Scottish standard languages. However, some studies show that the two varieties can be differentiated at a more fine-grained level. Overt and covert prestige has been clearly evidenced in their association with Anglo-SSE and Scots-SSE, where Anglo-SSE speakers are typically negatively evaluated in terms of likeability and national identity. Scottish-sounding varieties therefore appear to hold covert prestige in comparison, even though their speakers are commonly ranked low in social status but hold higher positions in most of the other social attributes.

It has been realised that the vowels /eɪ/ and /oʊ/ are typically monophthongal in quality for Scots-SSE speakers, and diphthongal for Anglo-SSE speakers. By analysing the distribution of [e] and [o] variants in the speech of SSE speakers, salient patterns are observed between Anglo-SSE and Scots- SSE speakers, suggesting that they are socially stratified within the given context.

Using the examples of FACE and GOAT which corresponds to the [e] and [o] vowels, evidence of covert prestige in SSE varieties can be observed. At the "Scottish" end of the SSE continuum, [e] and [o] are usually realised as monophthongs but are diphthonised to [ei] and [ou] (or [əu]) by some middle-class speakers who tend to be on the "Anglicised" end of the spectrum.

The starting point of the anglicised FACE vowel is centralised in the vowel space and the target of its trajectory is near [ɪ], while the corresponding Scots-SSE monophthong is produced with a higher, fronter quality. The anglicised GOAT vowel begins on an open, centralised quality and its off-glide remains as centralised but noticeably lower. In Scots-SSE, the production of [o] is monophthongal, low, and further back in articulation compared to the Anglo-SSE variant.

It has been observed that between the two varieties, Anglo-SSE speakers display the strongest evidence of convergence to the other group. Language convergence reflects a speaker's intention to gain social approval by reducing the social distance between themselves and their interlocutor. However, this does not always entail upward social convergence. Downward convergence occurs when speakers choose to adopt a lower-prestige variety in order to appear more co-operative, or to show affiliation to an alternative social group. This case of downward convergence by Anglo-SSE speakers suggests that Scots-SSE variants are considered as covertly prestigious, and convergence towards it is to appear empathetic, co-operative and mitigate their higher-status position.

The general avoidance of anglicized variants in an informal context suggests that SSE speakers assigned a higher level of overt prestige to Anglo-SSE, and that it is viewed as an inappropriately formal speech style. In turn, the adoption of Scots-SSE features by Anglo-SSE speakers in such context appears to indicate that the former enjoys the status of covert prestige, perhaps as a result of their strong connotations with Scottish national identity.

The linguistic relationship between the dialects is complicated by the fact that most speakers of Anglo-SSE are of ethnic English background, either being born in the country, being born in Scotland to English parents, or some other strong personal relationship to England. Conversely, most speakers of Scots-SSE tend to be autochthonous Scots. This dynamic is far from universal, and many exceptions exist, however this model can be followed as a broad rule. This ethnic dimension often means that speakers of Scots-SSE and other Scottish dialects often have difficulty distinguishing Anglo-SSE to Southern Standard British, and the Scottish linguistic features in Anglo-SSE are reduced to the extent that in many cases only those from outside Scotland may readily identify the accent as being Scottish. For speakers of Anglo-SSE, this can create confusion about their sense of national identity and can create mutual uncertainty or unease in their interactions with speakers of other Scottish accents and dialects.

==== Murcian Spanish ====
From a sociolinguistic perspective, the Murcian speech community shows a competing balance between overt and covert prestige. On one end, the Standard Castilian Spanish dialect is an overtly acknowledged prestige variety. The local values, however, make nonstandard features of the Murcian dialect be maintained in colloquial speech as a covertly acknowledged prestige variety.

The Spanish spoken in Murcia has traditionally and inevitably been associated with the vernacular world of farmers working in the fertile plains irrigated by the Segura River. Likewise, there is a sense of stigmatization of this variety among local speakers themselves, who consider it as an unaesthetic, incorrect, and inadequate substandard.

With the exception of [m] and [n], Murcian varieties can be distinguished by the loss of postvocalic consonants in final position. The regressive assimilation of consonant clusters in word-internal position except for [m], [n], and [l] is also another distinguishing feature. Two consequences of the consonant deletions are the changes in the synthetic morpho-syntactic structure of Spanish, which apparently entails a loss of grammatical information, and an increase in the ambiguity of Murcian Spanish.

Post-vocalic [s] dropping in word-final position also affects noun number and verb person marking. In the example that follows, [s] in sentence (2) is the plural marker on articles, adjectives, and nouns:

| 1. | La | Una | Otra | Casa bonita |
| 2. | Las | Unas | Otras | Casas bonitas |

1. 'The / A / Another nice house'

2. 'The / Some / Other nice houses'

But in verb forms, word-final [s] is heavily involved in person marking:

Present Tense Simple

| 2nd person SG | tú | com-es | 'you (fam.) eat' |
| 2nd person SG | usted | com-e | 'you (pol.) eat' |
| 3rd person SG | él / ella | com-e | 'he/she eats' |

Past Tense Simple

| 1st person SG | yo | com-ía | 'I ate' |
| 2nd person SG | tú | com-ías | 'you (fam.) ate' |
| 2nd person SG | usted | com-ía | 'you (pol.) ate' |
| 3rd person SG | él / ella | com-ía | 'he/she ate' |

The disambiguation of number and person marking in Murcian Spanish is typically addressed using changes in consonants or vowels, as listed below:

| | Changes | Standard Castilian Spanish vs. Murcian Spanish |
| i) | intervocalic [d] deletion | comido: [koˈmiðo] vs. [koˈmi.o] |
| ii) | intervocalic [r] deletion | para: [ˈpaɾa] vs. [pa] |
| iii) | word-final postvocalic [r] deletion | comer: [koˈmer] vs. [kɔˈmɛ] |
| iv) | word-final postvocalic [l] deletion | canal: [kaˈnal] vs. [kæˈnæ] |
| v) | consonant permutation, which means that liquid consonants, i.e. [l] and [r] exchange in pronunciation | [algo] vs. [argo] |
| vi) | word-final postvocalic [s] deletion | casas: ['kasas] vs. ['kæsæ] |
| vii) | word-internal postvocalic [s] assimilation | canasta: [kaˈnasta] vs. [kaˈnatta] |
| viii) | other word-internal consonant regressive assimilations of consonant clusters | tacto: [ˈtakto] vs. [ˈtatto] |

Despite Murcian speakers' negative value judgments of their own variety, they do not abandon it entirely. Rather, because these features of the colloquial vernacular are so deeply rooted within the Murcian speech community, they have become part of the local identity.

In fact, the former President of the Local Government of Murcia in Southeastern Spain, María Antonia Martínez, shows unexpectedly high usage levels for non-standard Murcian Spanish features in her public speeches, despite it being a stigmatised dialect. Analysis of her speeches have shown that she is purposefully using local Murcian features because they are very much associated with the working class world and with progressive ideas. She capitalised on the covert prestige associated with the colloquial variety to highlight her Murcian identity and socialist ideals in the particular political context in which she is operating. This shows that standard forms are not always adhered to, and speakers can benefit by using non-standard varieties to design their desired personas and achieve their desired goals.

=== Grammar ===
==== African American Vernacular English ====
Although African American Vernacular English (AAVE) is clearly stigmatised in modern American culture, it continues to be spoken by millions of people. Within the context of the community, AAVE is a valuable resource and an important aspect of group identity. A person with in-group status will often have access to local resources and networks that outsiders will not have. In this sense, using AAVE in the community can be as valuable and important as using Standard English in mainstream professional situations. Because of the covert prestige that AAVE carries, it continues to be an important resource and symbol of solidarity for African Americans, despite the common misconception that AAVE carries "ungrammatical" features, or that any speaker who speaks AAVE are "uneducated" or "sloppy". However, like all dialects, AAVE shows consistent internal logic and grammatical complexity, as explained in the following examples:

The use of 'done' coupled with the past tense of the verb in a sentence, as seen in "they done used all the good ones", is a persistent structural trait of AAVE that is shared with Southern European American vernacular varieties of English. Although the verbal particle 'done' also occurs in Caribbean creoles, its syntactic configuration and semantic-pragmatic function in AAVE differ somewhat from its creole counterparts.

In AAVE, 'done' occurs only in preverbal auxiliary position with past tense forms whereas it occurs with a bare verb stem (e.g. "They done go") and can occur in clause-final position in some creoles. In many aspects, it functions in AAVE like a perfect tense, referring to an action completed in the recent past, but it can also be used to highlight the change of state or to intensify an activity, as in the sentence "I done told you not to mess up". It is a stable feature, but it is more frequently used in Southern rural versions of AAVE than in urban AAVE.

Double negation is also another feature commonly found in AAVE, referring to the marking of negation on the auxiliary verb and indefinite pronoun. An example would be "she ain't tellin' nobody", which would be "she isn't telling anybody" in Standard English.

Another feature, copula absence, or the absence of 'is' or 'are' in certain contexts, can be observed as well. "He workin' " or "they going home" are some examples.

The habitual aspect marker, or the invariant 'be' / habitual 'be', as seen in "he be workin'", "they be tryin'" or "I be like" is a typical feature of AAVE. It is the use of the base form of the copula verb 'be' instead of the inflected forms such as 'are' and 'am'. This is probably the most salient grammatical trait of AAVE both within the community and outside of it, to the point of it being a stereotype prominently figured in representations of AAVE, especially in the media.

The link between language and identity can be stretched into a tripartite where culture becomes key. The addition of culture to the way language is linked to identity blur the lines, because culture can be considered an abstract concept, particularly in the United States. It is nearly impossible to pinpoint a common culture in a country filled with so many different cultures, especially when many of them are several generations removed from their origins. Because of the racial make-up of the country, it is not ideal to include all American citizens under a blanket term labelled "American culture". Black culture does exist however, and its association with AAVE carries strong social connotations. AAVE is no longer a racial construction but has become something that can possibly be described as an urban or hip-hop culture. It includes a certain fashion style, a particular taste in music or even in gait, but most importantly — also a style of speech. However, these are not what Black culture itself is about, but merely representations of it.

==== Singapore Colloquial English ====
Similarly, Singlish is commonly considered a language with low prestige. In fact, the official discouragement and routine censorship of its usage advocated by the Singapore government has resulted in overt prestige being ascribed to Standard Singapore English. Yet despite the maelstrom of scorn that Singlish has been subjected to, it has been proclaimed the 'quintessential mark of Singaporean-ness' and its usage has continued unabated.

Singlish tends to be spoken in informal situations, such as between friends and family, taking a taxi or shopping for groceries. It indicates casual intimacy. English, on the other hand, is used for formal situations like school and work. However, over time, this has become a social marker. Someone who can effectively code-switch between the two languages is perceived to be more educated and of a higher social status than someone who can only speak Singlish. Someone who can only speak English, and not Singlish, meanwhile, may be seen as posh, or not considered to be a "true" Singaporean. Being able to speak Singlish builds instant rapport, and it can therefore be postulated that covert prestige is attributed to the non-standard form.

Singlish is a mixing of the variety of languages spoken in Singapore, which includes Malay, Hokkien, Cantonese, Mandarin and other Chinese languages, as well as Tamil from southern India. It is no surprise that the grammar mirrors some of these languages, such as doing away with most prepositions, verb conjugations, and plural words.

For example, a modern-day Singaporean could say "I go bus-stop wait for you" to mean that he will wait for the interlocutor at the bus stop. This phrase could be translated into either Malay or Chinese without having to change the grammatical structure of the sentence.

The following are a couple of examples of the grammar structure in Singlish. It is typical for the 'be' verb to be missing in a Singlish sentence, such as "why I so unlucky?", when the Standard English form would be "why am I so unlucky?". Another example, the Singlish construction "he is always so unlucky one", compared to "he has always been unlucky", shows the addition of "one" at the end of sentences which provides an effect of adding emphasis to the sentence.

People who are unfamiliar with the grammatical structures of the languages that influence Singlish, as well as its unique grammatical features, may as a result consider Singlish an incorrect or "bad" form of English.

=== Vocabulary ===
Afrikaans

Within Afrikaans speakers in South Africa, code-switching between Afrikaans and English is frowned upon in formal domains, even as new terms and concepts enter the lexicon through English-speaking sources. Loanwords are frowned upon in formal contexts, but are more accepted in informal domains. While most Afrikaans speakers are balanced bilinguals of Afrikaans and English, the practice is to immediately replace or adapt English loanwords into Afrikaans itself, in an effort to preserve the purity of the Afrikaans language. In informal situations, the linguistic environment is such that it is more open to English loanwords as long as it is marked, and stigmatised.

=== Expletives ===
Although the use of expletives may offend society at large, in specific social circles or situations, the use of expletives is accepted, and expected, in order to earn covert prestige. This is because profanity carries covert prestige that promotes solidarity or build intimacy, be it amongst coworkers, friends, or lovers.

It is as if they are saying, 'I know you so well I can be this rude to you,'.

There are, however, additional uses for expletives on top of developing friendships and building solidarity, such as to get attention or convey urgency. This is particularly the case in the workplace, which was demonstrated by white-collar workers in the United Kingdom, France, and the United States. For women, expletives may also be used to combat gender roles by demonstrating their assertiveness in men-dominated workplaces or to earn respect from their men co-workers.

Although covert prestige may be prescribed to the use of expletives regardless of nationality or gender, there are some differences which may be observed in the form and function of how these expletives are used in different cultures:

In British speakers, the use of expletives can be used both in aggressive terms and in a cordial way. For example, the British speakers use expressions like "piss off", "we're getting pissed" and "are you taking the piss", where the word "piss" is used as an imperative for someone to go away, getting drunk, and teasing somebody respectively. American speakers, however, never use these forms. On the other hand, they only use this word in expressions such as "you piss me off" and "I'm pissed at him", where there is a strong connotation of anger. American speakers are much more likely to use derogatory terms in a reclaimed sense as well, such as "bitch". Despite these differences, the use of expletives in this way of expressing oneself grants the user covert prestige.

== Effects ==
=== Advertising ===
Advertisements are a specialised form of discourse that exists solely to persuade more people to buy products. The use of language that grants covert prestige in advertisements is therefore just another tactic to make them more persuasive.

Advertisements are designed to appeal to the largest possible audience, meaning that it would be obviously beneficial for advertisers to not appear discriminative. Hence, they can incorporate non-standard language, much like how people may use Spanish in the United States to appear more "cosmopolitan", to express their loyalty to, and affiliation with, the Southwest to gain regional 'authenticity', or to indicate that they have a sense of humour. These motivations also makes use of essentialized notions of Spanish-speaking populations, such as being foreign and exotic, traits which speakers may wish to associate themselves with. Similarly, the use of African American Vernacular English allows speakers to present themselves with a public image that identifies with stereotypes of African Americans, such as being hip, urban, tough, and ultra-contemporary. This covert prestige granted to African American Vernacular English is also linked to the consumerist hip-hop lifestyle. Hence, advertisers may make use of this covert prestige by portraying knowledge of African American Vernacular English to align themselves with these positive aspects of the stereotypes of African Americans, as well as to identify themselves as being well-versed in ultra-hip trends that consumers have a desire to follow, and to suggest that their own products are hip.

=== Politics ===
Political communication has shown to be effective when a candidate is perceived to be an "everyday man". Using a non-standard language variety, colloquialisms, or expletives may thus have a positive effect through the perception of informality.

When interacting with the public in light of upcoming elections, politicians tend to switch to colloquial speech in an effort to "fit in" with the local setting. For example, former president Barack Obama was seen a week before his first inauguration in a restaurant asking for "cheddah" cheese, addressing staff with "y'all" and using phrases like "we straight" to indicate that he didn't need change from the cashier.

After Donald Trump's victory in the 2016 United States presidential election, it was noted that more and more politicians are beginning to curse in public, using expletives and language that, in the past, has been reserved for discourse away from voters and the media. This is due to the covert prestige granted to this type of language, allowing politicians to come across more "authentic" despite conveying an angrier tone, helping them appeal to certain voters.

== See also ==
- Creole language
- Dialect
- Diglossia
- Language and gender
- Language convergence
- Linguistic insecurity
- List of prestige dialects
- Prestige (sociolinguistics)
- Sociolinguistics
