= Dialect levelling in Britain =

Increasing homogeneity of accents in British English

Dialect levelling is the means by which dialect differences decrease. For example, in rural areas of Britain, although English is widely spoken, the pronunciation and the grammar have historically varied. During the twentieth century, more people moved into towns and cities, standardising English. Dialect levelling can develop by the influence of various types of media.

== Background ==
Many of the great works in English dialectology were prompted because of fears that the dialects would soon die out and of a desire to record the dialect in time. Joseph Wright began his English Dialect Dictionary by saying "It is quite evident from the letters daily received at the 'Workshop' that pure dialect speech is rapidly disappearing from our midst, and that in a few years it will be almost impossible to get accurate information about difficult points." Harold Orton told his fieldworkers on the Survey of English Dialects that they had to work quickly in "a last-minute exercise to scoop out the last remaining vestige of dialect before it died out under the pressures of modern movement and communication." The results of the Atlas Linguarum Europae in England, collected in the late 1970s, did indeed find a reduction of lexical diversity since Harold Orton's survey.

Dialect levelling is a linguistic phenomenon studied and observed by dialectologists and sociolinguists. There are different researcher opinions on what constitutes a dialect in this context. Chambers and Trudgill (1984) choose to view a dialect as a subdivision of a particular language such as the Parisian dialect of French and the Lancashire dialect of English. They feel that standard English is just as much a dialect as any other form of English and that it is incorrect to suppose that one language is in any way linguistically superior to another.

Sociolinguists study relations between language and social groups. This includes topics such as the differences in language usage between men and women, older and younger people, and lower and higher social classes, and attitudes towards various language forms. The techniques developed by sociolinguists can be used to study the phenomenon of dialect levelling (Boves, & Gerritsen, 1995).

== Development ==
Dialect levelling occurs mostly in socially and geographically mobile groups and in contexts where people have a tendency to adapt to their listener in order to ensure they better understand. People who come to a new town adapt their language and unconsciously leave out local language elements so that the hearer will understand them better. As a result, dialect forms that have a wide geographical and social range tend to be used more often. Eventually these short-term adaptions become long-term changes. Though most of the adjustments happen largely unconsciously, some people are more open to language change and adaptation than others and this influences the extent to which dialect levelling takes place (Kerswill, 2003; Milroy, 2002).

Historical examples show that dialect levelling generally takes place anywhere and anytime in situations of extensive mobility and cultural and linguistic mixing. One historical example of dialect levelling is the change in the London dialect that took place in the fifteenth century when Northern county immigrants moved to London. Their dialect diffused into southern forms and some elements were incorporated into standard English (Milroy, 2002). Dialect levelling has become a widespread phenomenon in Britain. Southern features seem to be spreading throughout the whole country and typical vowel sounds seem to be centred on big cities like Glasgow, Manchester, or Newcastle (Kerswill, 2001).

Due to an increase in mobility, migration, and the media, who portray variety in language as something positive, dialect levelling seems to take place more quickly than before (Kerswill, 2003).

== Cases ==
The following are the results of several research projects with a focus on dialect levelling. They enhance our knowledge of the dialect levelling that is taking place today in Great Britain. There has been research on the phenomenon of dialect leveling in Hull, Milton Keynes, and Reading (Williams, & Kerswill, 1999):

- The survey of British Dialect Grammar in the metropolitan regions of Blackburn, Birmingham, Cardiff, Nottingham, Glasgow, London, Liverpool, Manchester, Newcastle, Preston, Sheffield, Teesside, Coventry, Swansea, Brighton, Leeds, and Bristol (Cheshire, Edwards, & Whittle, 1989).

The major urban centres of Britain have certain grammatical features in common in their spoken English and so we could say that a ‘standardising’ non-standard variety of English is developing.

- Social network and class culture as independent influences on language change (Kerswill & Williams, 2000)

In Milton Keynes, a new phenomenon has been investigated in linguistics research. A large group of working class people have moved to Milton Keynes, away from their home town and kin, in the hope of finding better housing. Unlike traditional working-class communities, they do not form close-knit networks and tend to keep themselves to themselves. This type of network is common with migrants everywhere. For some features, especially vowels, the levelling leans towards the Received Pronunciation norm. For other features, especially consonants, the levelling leans more towards a general, southern, non-standard norm.

Strong class awareness amongst youngsters and strong prejudice against 'posh' people explain why Standard English and Received Pronunciation are not fully adopted. For the working class of Milton Keynes, it is a priority to establish a distinction between themselves and the upper class. This indicates that mobility and social class appear to be two separate influences that do not necessarily go hand in hand.

== Examples ==
The following are examples of new language features that are currently spreading throughout Britain. They are slowly taking the place of typical regional features.

- Th-fronting in Britain. This is when the -th- is pronounced as [f] or [v] (Kerswill, 2003).
- The following are the 13 most reported dialect features in the metropolitan regions of Blackburn, Birmingham, Cardiff, Nottingham, Glasgow, London, Liverpool, Manchester, Newcastle, Preston, Sheffield, Teesside, Coventry, Swansea, Brighton, Leeds and Bristol, according to The Survey of British Dialect Grammar.
  - Them as demonstrative determiner (Look at them big spiders),
  - 'Should of' (You should of left half an hour ago),
  - Absence of plural marking (To make a big cake you need two pound of flour),
  - What as subject relative pronoun (The film what was on last night was good),
  - 'Never' as past tense negator (No, I never broke that),
  - 'There was' with plural 'notional' subject (There was some singers here a minute ago),
  - 'There's' with plural 'notional' subject (There's cars outside the church),
  - Perfect participle 'sat' following BE auxiliary (She was sat over there looking at her car),
  - Adverbial 'quick' (I like pasta. It cooks really quick),
  - 'Ain't'/'in't' (that ain't working/ that in't working),
  - 'Give me it' (give me it, please),
  - Perfect participle 'stood' following BE auxiliary (And he was stood in the corner looking at it),
  - Non-standard 'was' (we was singing) (Cheshire, Edwards, & Whittle, 1989)

Estuary English has been added as an example of modern-day dialect levelling because it is the well known result of dialect levelling that has been taking place on the Thames Estuary over the past twenty years. It is situated somewhere in the middle between popular London speech and Received Pronunciation. People arrive at it from above and from below. As people climb the social ladder they tend to correct their speech. They get rid of grammatically nonstandard features such as double negatives, the word 'ain't' and past tense forms such as 'writ' for 'wrote' and 'come' for 'came'. They also adapt their accent, for example pronouncing the ⟨h⟩ instead of dropping it, replacing the glottal stops with [t] as in water, and changing some vowels. Some claim that Estuary English is becoming the new standard, replacing Received Pronunciation, and that Received Pronunciation speakers are adopting it themselves (Kerswill, 2001; Milroy, 2002).

== Influences ==
=== Migration within a country ===
Over the past forty years people have moved out of the cities and into dormitory towns and suburbs. In addition thirty-five new towns, such as Milton Keynes were created across the country (Kerswill, 2001). Industrialisation often causes an increase in work opportunities in a certain area causing people to move and evoking a general willingness to adopt certain language features that are typical for this area (Milroy, 2002).

In general first-generation adult migrants only show slight language changes, whereas their children produce a more homogeneous language. When these children become teenagers, they often feel pressured to conform to the language of their peer group and thus a new levelled language variety starts to emerge (Williams, & Kerswill, 1999).

=== Lateral (geographical) mobility ===
Modern transportation has made travel easier and more efficient. This results in people travelling larger distances to work and meeting people from different areas at work, which in turn exposes them to different dialects and encourages dialect levelling. It causes employers to expect that employees are flexible and willing to work at different locations or to change locations throughout their career. It produces language missionaries or people that move away from their native area for a period of time and then return, bringing with them some traces of a foreign dialect and it results in the fact that parents nowadays do not come from the same community, causing dialect levelling to take place within the family (Williams, & Kerswill, 1999).

=== Vertical social mobility ===
When people are promoted they often feel the need to adapt their language so that a wider group of people will understand them more clearly. They often leave out typical regional varieties and use more widely known varieties instead. Schools realise the need for a common language variety and encourage pupils to adopt Standard English (Williams, & Kerswill, 1999).

=== People approach new language forms positively ===
Popular media such as TV and radio stations broadcast mostly from London and the south, causing traces of southern accents to be found in the north. Nowadays, however, one finds a generally positive attitude towards different language forms as Non-Received Pronunciation English can be heard on every radio and television station. BBC newsreaders still form an exception in this respect, though even there Welsh and Scottish accents seem to be accepted. This positive attitude towards different varieties of English seems to catch on with the general public (Kerswill, 2001)(Williams, & Kerswill, 1999).

=== Women are generally more open to new language varieties ===
Several studies show that women adopt widely used language features more easily than men. The language of women tends to be more neutral and shows less regional varieties, though their language does not necessarily come closer to Received Pronunciation. Dialect levelling often starts with women but quickly spreads to the rest of the family (Kerswill, 2003).

=== Speakers want to maintain a unique dialect that distinguishes them from others ===
In some cases more than others, linguistic distinctiveness seems to be a sociolinguistic priority. When having a conversation with someone of a different dialect community, some people like to emphasise their own dialect (Kerswill, & Williams 2000)(Milroy, 2002). Amongst youngsters of all classes there is often a strong class awareness. Working-class teenagers for example, are known to make strong statements against 'posh' people. These class-based norms influence a person's willingness to adopt standard English and Received Pronunciation and their dislike for different language varieties (Kerswill, & Williams 2000).

=== Natural factors ===
Not all language changes are caused by external influences. Sometimes language changes through the course of time. One example of such a change is [θ]-fronting (Kerswill, 2003).

== Related items ==
=== Geographical diffusion ===
Over the larger area of Great Britain, geographical diffusion tends to take place as opposed to dialect levelling. In this case specific language features spread out from a densely populated, economical and culturally dominant centre. Where dialect levelling takes place locally, geographical diffusion covers large areas (Kerswill, 2003).

=== Social dialect ===
The Survey of British Dialect Grammar suggests the term social dialect (sociolect) as opposed to regional dialect because the dialect a person uses seems to be more closely related to a person's social activities and relationships with other people than to the place where a person resides (Cheshire, Edwards, & Whittle, 1989).

=== Koinéisation ===
Koinéisation is the process by which speakers create a new language variety based on the dialects of the speakers with whom they have come into contact (Milroy, 2002).

=== Standardisation of language ===
The formalisation of a language variety with the intervention of an institution (Milroy, 2002).

== See also ==
- Dialect continuum
- Language convergence
- Mutual intelligibility
