= Prestige (sociolinguistics) =

Level of respect towards a language variety in a speech community

Prestige in sociolinguistics is the level of regard normally accorded a specific language or dialect within a speech community, relative to other languages or dialects. Prestige varieties are language or dialect families which are generally considered by a society to be the most "correct" or otherwise superior. In many cases, they are the standard form of the language, though there are exceptions, particularly in situations of covert prestige (where a non-standard dialect is highly valued). In addition to dialects and languages, prestige is also applied to smaller linguistic features, such as the pronunciation or usage of words or grammatical constructs, which may not be distinctive enough to constitute a separate dialect. The concept of prestige provides one explanation for the phenomenon of variation in form among speakers of a language or languages.

The presence of prestige dialects is a result of the relationship between the prestige of a group of people and the language that they use. Generally, the language or variety that is regarded as more prestigious in that community is the one used by the more prestigious group. The level of prestige a group has can also influence whether the language that they speak is considered its own language or a dialect (implying that it does not have enough prestige to be considered its own language).

Social class has a correlation with the language that is considered more prestigious, and studies in different communities have shown that sometimes members of a lower social class attempt to emulate the language of individuals in higher social classes to avoid how their distinct language would otherwise construct their identity. The relationship between language and identity construction as a result of prestige influences the language used by different individuals, depending on to which groups they belong or want to belong.

Sociolinguistic prestige is especially visible in situations where two or more distinct languages are used, and in diverse, socially stratified urban areas, in which there are likely to be speakers of different languages and/or dialects interacting often. The result of language contact depends on the power relationship between the languages of the groups that are in contact.

The prevailing view among contemporary linguists is that, regardless of perceptions that a dialect or language is "better" or "worse" than its counterparts, when dialects and languages are assessed "on purely linguistic grounds, all languages—and all dialects—have equal merit".

Additionally, which varieties, registers or features will be considered more prestigious depends on audience and context. There are thus the concepts of overt and covert prestige. Overt prestige is related to standard and "formal" language features, and expresses power and status; covert prestige is related more to vernacular and often patois, and expresses solidarity, community and group identity more than authority.

== Standard varieties and covert prestige ==
Prestige varieties are those that are regarded mostly highly within a society. As such, the standard language, the form promoted by authorities—usually governmental or from those in power—and considered "correct" or otherwise superior, is often the prestige variety. However, there are many exceptions to this rule, such as Arabic, in which Egyptian Arabic is widely used in mass media aimed at international audiences, while Literary Arabic (also known as Standard Arabic) is a more prestigious form. Prestige varieties do not exhibit features, grammatically speaking, which prove them superior in terms of logic, efficacy or aesthetics. With certain exceptions, they are the language varieties of the prestigious social classes. Therefore, the prestige variety of a given language community or nation-state has symbolic significance and may act as an instrument of political power.

The notion of a standard language in a speech community is related to the prestige of the languages spoken in the community. In general, "greater prestige tends to be attached to the notion of the standard, since it can function in higher domains, and has a written form." While there are some counterexamples, such as Arabic, "prestigious and standard varieties [tend to] coincide to the extent that the two terms can be used interchangeably."

In countries like the United States, where citizens speak many different languages and come from a variety of national and ethnic groups, there is a "folk linguistic" belief that the most prestigious dialect is the single standard dialect of English that all people should speak. Linguist Rosina Lippi-Green argues that this belief in a standard language defends and rationalizes the preservation of the social order. Linguists believe that no variety of language is inherently better than any other, for every language serves its purpose of allowing its users to communicate. This is because every variety of a language is systematic and rule governed. These rules do not contain a hierarchy, thus certain varieties—linguistically—are not placed above another.

The terms and conditions of prestige assigned to a language variety are subject to change depending on speaker, situation and context. A dialect or variety which is considered prestigious in one context will not carry the same status in another. The relative status of language varies according to audience, situation and other contextual elements such as geographic location. Covert prestige refers to relatively high value placed on a non-standard form of language.

== Causes ==
Different languages and dialects are accorded prestige based upon factors such as literary heritage, the degree of language modernization, international standing, and the prestige of its speakers. These, and other attributes and factors contribute to how the language is viewed as being of high prestige, leaving a language or dialect with few or none of these attributes to be considered to be of low prestige.

Language is intertwined with culture, and therefore there is often a strong correlation between the prestige of a group of people and the prestige of the language they speak. For example, Latin grew to be considered prestigious due to the prestige of the churchmen, lawyers and scholars who used it. According to linguist Laurie Bauer, "Latin was held to be noble and beautiful, not just the thoughts expressed in it or the people who used it. What is called 'beauty' in a language is more accurately seen as a reflection of the prestige of its speakers".

In Western Europe, different languages were considered high-prestige throughout history. For example, Italian as the Mediterranean lingua franca and as the language of the Renaissance; and French of the court culture in the 17th-18th century.

Similarly, Sanskrit began to be considered the oldest language in the world when 18th century British philologist William Jones published the following:

The Sanskrit language, whatever be its antiquity, is of a wonderful structure; more perfect than the Greek, more copious than the Latin, and more exquisitely refined than either, yet bearing to both of them a stronger affinity, both in the roots of verbs and in the forms of grammar, than could possibly have been produced by accident; so strong indeed, that no philologer could examine them all three, without believing them to have sprung from some common source, which, perhaps, no longer exists: there is a similar reason, though not quite so forcible, for supposing that both the Gothic and the Celtic, though blended with a very different idiom, had the same origin with the Sanskrit.

This was followed by other languages increasing their prestige by claiming to be as close as Sanskrit to a presumed Proto-Indo-European language or linked to other Proto-Indo-European mythology, both in Europe and South Asia.

Walt Wolfram, a professor of linguistics at North Carolina State University, notes that he "can't think of any situations in the United States where low-prestige groups have high-prestige language systems". Wolfram further emphasizes this in his PBS documentary "Do You Speak American?", and explains how there is a very clear hierarchy in which "modern American English" is at the top, and African American Vernacular English (AAVE) is at the bottom, because AAVE is seldom considered "standard" English in academic settings.

The education system is one of the primary agents in emphasizing a "standard" way of speaking. For example, Wolfram's documentary also shows how speakers of AAVE are often corrected by teachers, since it has linguistic features that are different from what has been deemed the "standard." Criticism of AAVE in schools by teachers not only insults the students that speak AAVE, but those insults also put the individuals who taught these students how to speak, such as their family members, in a subordinate position. In turn, this further reinforces stratification of social groups in a linguistic and social context. In schools around the world that teach English, speaking "proper" English is emphasized, even if other varieties are equally valid and able to communicate the same ideas. In a school in Mumbai, India, there is a large emphasis placed on speaking "good English." Thus, proficiency is not determined by ability to convey ideas, but rather the grammatical adherence of the speaker to the rules used in the "standard" English variety, and speaking English that way. This not only perpetuates the idea of a "correct" way of speaking in the classroom, but this subordination extends well outside of the classroom.

Many films and TV shows (especially children's TV shows) use different language varieties for different characters, which constructs their identity in particular ways. For example, the protagonists of Disney animated films tend to speak Standard American English, while minor characters or antagonists are more likely to speak with other accents. This is true even when characters would not logically speak English, as in the film Aladdin, where the title character Aladdin, his love interest Jasmine, and Jasmine's father have American accents, but several other characters do not. Associating the American accent with sympathetic or prestigious characters in children's TV shows/movies can have negative implications, contributing to the formation of stereotypes and biases.

== Language attitudes ==
Prestige influences whether a language variety is considered a language or a dialect. In discussing definitions of language, Dell Hymes wrote that "sometimes two communities are said to have the same, or different, languages on the grounds of mutual intelligibility, or lack thereof", but alone, this definition is often insufficient.

Different language varieties in an area exist along a dialect continuum, and moving geographically often means a change in the local variety.

This continuum means that despite the fact that standard German and standard Dutch are not mutually intelligible, the speech of people living near the border between Germany and the Netherlands will more closely resemble that of their neighbors across the border than the standard languages of their respective home countries. Even so, speakers near the border would describe themselves as speaking a variety of their respective standard languages, and the evolution of these dialects tends to mirror that of the standard languages as well.

That they are classified as such reflects the fact that "language differences are not only marks of differential group membership, but also powerful triggers of group attitudes". Such fuzziness has resulted in the aphorism "A language is a dialect with an army and navy." That is, speakers of some language variety with political and social power are viewed as having a distinct language, while "'dialect' is [...] a term that suggests lower-class or rural speech".

A canonical example of this are the Scandinavian languages, including Danish, Swedish, and Norwegian, where language differences "constitute barriers to but do not wholly block communication", but are considered distinct languages because they are spoken in different countries.

=== Social class ===
While some differences between dialects are regional in nature, there are also social causes for differences in dialects. Very often, the "public prestige dialect of the elite in a stratified community differs from the dialect(s) of the non-elite strata (working class and other)". In fact, in an article which in part tried to motivate the study of sociolinguistics, Raven McDavid wrote that "the importance of language as a mirror of culture can be demonstrated by dialect differences in American English". Thus the relation between the way speakers use a language and their social status is a long recognized tool in sociolinguistics.

In 1958, one of the earliest studies of the relationship between social differences and dialect differences was published by John Gumperz, who studied the speech patterns in Khalapur, a small, highly stratified village in India. In all, the village has 31 castes, ranging from Brahmins and Rajputs at the top, to Chamars and Bhangis at the bottom, and 90% of the overall population was Hindu, with the remaining 10% Muslim.

Gumperz observed that the different castes were distinguished both phonologically and lexically, with each caste having a vocabulary specific to their subculture. Remarkably, the speech differences between Hindus and Muslims "are of the same order as those between individual touchable castes and certainly much less important than the variation between touchables and untouchables".

Gumperz also observed that the lower prestige groups sought to imitate the higher prestige speech patterns and that over time, it had caused the evolution of the prestige away from the regional standard, as higher prestige groups sought to differentiate themselves from lower prestige groups. He concluded that in determining speech patterns in this community, "the determining factor seems to be informal friendship contacts" rather than work contacts.

An example of this was also observed in a study in Madrid, Spain, where Latin American Spanish-speakers noticed that certain features of their Spanish were evaluated negatively by local speakers. Spanish varieties spoken in Latin American countries have linguistic differences from the way many locals in Madrid speak. Their use of Latin American Spanish is associated with "symbolic and monetary capital (such as social class and ethnicity)." The study asserted that "To be accepted, therefore, the speakers have to "correct" these "errors" and "adapt" to the local variety of Spanish, which is considered the model to follow. In other words, to be acknowledged as full participants in their respective communities, these participants have to sound like locals." Thus, social class plays a role in determining prestige, impacting the way that Latin American Spanish is acknowledged.

One notable example of the relationship between dialect and social stratification in English is William Labov's 1966 study of the variable pronunciation of r in New York City. Labov went to three New York City department stores that catered to three clearly delineated socioeconomic groups—Saks (high), Macy's (middle), and S. Klein (low)—and studied how their employees pronounced the phrase "fourth floor". His results demonstrated that the employees at Saks pronounced r most often, Macy's employees pronounced r less often, and at S. Klein, seventy-nine percent of the respondents said no r at all. Another trend Labov noticed was that at all three of the stores, but Macy's in particular, when prompted to say "fourth floor" a second time, employees were much more likely to pronounce the r.

Labov attributed his findings to the perceived prestige of each dialect. He noted that New York City's "dropped 'r' has its origins in posh British speech", but after World War II, "with the loss of Britain's imperial status 'r'-less British speech ceased to be regarded as 'prestige speech'". In 1966, when Labov performed his study, pronouncing words like car and guard with r was then considered an element of prestige speech. This resulted in middle-class employees, once made conscious of having to pronounce "fourth floor", altering their pronunciation in order to match that of the high prestige dialect. The prestige given to r was also evident in the hypercorrection observed in lower-class speech. Knowing that r-pronunciation was a prestigious trait, many of the lower-class speakers in another Labov study—in which speakers were asked to read from word lists—added -r to words that did not have an r at all. The difference between this study and the "fourth floor" study was the fact that speakers were closely monitoring their speech, not speaking spontaneously, and were thus careful to add r in an attempt to mimic a higher social class.

Another prime example of covert prestige is within popular culture. The pervasiveness of hip hop music and its usage of AAVE has coined many widely used terms. Usage of AAVE has created a certain social capital, or clout, in certain social contexts. Contrastingly, in educational or hierarchical settings, usage of this variety can result in negative connotations. Due to this, practitioners are often perceived as having minimal academic prowess or being lowly educated. They can also be associated with poverty or low economic means. These inherent stigmas and biases impede the AAVE speaker from academic, social, and economic success.

=== Gender and covert prestige ===
Non-standard dialects are usually considered low-prestige, but in some situations dialects "stigmatized by the education system still enjoy a covert prestige among working-class men for the very reason that they are considered incorrect". These situations occur when the speaker wants to gain recognition, acceptance, or solidarity with a specific—and non-prestigious—group of people, or to signal to other speakers their identification with that group. The idea of covert prestige was first introduced by William Labov, who noticed that even speakers who used non-standard dialects often believed that their own dialect was "bad" or "inferior". Labov realized that there must be some underlying reason for their use of the dialect, which he identified as a signal of group identity. One example is a 1998 study on the use of word-final -ing versus -in among college fraternity men in the United States. The fraternity men used "-in" rather than "-ing," from which the author concluded that the men used -in to demonstrate what they saw as working-class behavioral traits, such as 'hard-working' and 'casual,' thus creating a specific identity for themselves.

In a study by Elaine Chun, it was noted that even though the use of African-American Vernacular English (AAVE) is not viewed as the standard in many American schools, and thus is often corrected by teachers, there are some instances where non-African Americans use AAVE to construct their identity in a particular way and enjoy covert prestige in the African American speech community. The study pointed out that "mainstream uses of AAVE 'slang' are especially prevalent in social circles that desire to create and project a heterosexual masculinity," and included examples of a Korean-American student using AAVE to gain recognition/acceptance in the African American speech community. This underscores that the relative status of language varies according to audience.

Likewise, in studies of the speech patterns in British English, Peter Trudgill observed that more working-class women spoke the standard dialect than men. Farida Abu-Haidar performed a similar study in Baghdad of prestige in the Arabic language, after which she concluded that in Baghdadi Arabic, women are more conscious of prestige than are men. Other areas in which this has been observed include New Zealand and Guangdong in China. As explanation, Trudgill suggests that for men, there is covert prestige associated with speaking the working-class dialect. In fact, he observed men claiming to speak a less prestigious dialect than that which they actually spoke. According to this interpretation then, "women's use of prestige features simply conforms to the ordinary sociolinguistic order, while men deviate from what is expected." Elizabeth Gordon, in her study of New Zealand, suggested instead that women used higher prestige forms because of the association of sexual immorality with lower-class women. Whatever the cause, women across many cultures seem more likely than men to modify their speech towards the prestige dialect.

Though women use prestige dialects more than men, the same gender preference for prestige languages does not seem to exist. A study of diglossic societies by John Angle and Sharlene Hesse-Biber showed that the poorer men were more likely to speak the prestige language than were poorer women, even though women were more particularly "drawn to the language of the rich." One explanation put forth for this is that poorer men are more likely to have the means of acquiring a second language than poorer women as a result of having "greater exposure" and "greater economic motivation."

== Language contact ==
When different language varieties come into contact, a variety of relationships can form between the two, all typically influenced by prestige. When they have equal power or prestige, they form adstratum, as exemplified by Old English and Old Norse, which shared elements with each other more or less equally.

Far more common is for the two languages to have an unequal power relationship, as is the case of many colonial language contact situations. Languages that have a higher status in relation to a certain group often manifest themselves in word borrowing. One example is in English, which features many French words, as a result of the historical prestige of French. Another potential result of such contact relationships includes the creation of a pidgin or eventually creole through nativization. In the case of pidgins and creoles, it is usually noted that the low prestige language provides the phonology while the high prestige language provides the lexicon and grammatical structure.

In addition to forming a new language, known as a creole, language contact can result in changes, such as language convergence, language shift or language death. Language convergence is when two languages have been exposed for a long period of time and they begin to have more properties in common. Language shift is when a speaker shifts from speaking a lower prestige dialect to a higher prestige dialect. Language death can happen in many ways, one of which is when speakers of a language die off, and there are no new generations learning to speak this language. The intensity of the contact between the two languages and their relative prestige levels influence the degree to which a language experiences lexical borrowing and changes to the morphology, phonology, syntax, and overall structure of the language.

== Language structure ==
When two languages with an asymmetrical power relationship come into contact, such as through colonization or in a refugee situation, the creole that results is typically largely based on the prestige language; as noted above, linguists have observed that the low-prestige language usually provides the phonology while the high-prestige language provides the lexicon and grammatical structure. Over time, continued contact between the creole and the prestige language may result in decreolization, in which the creole begins to more closely resemble the prestige language. Decreolization thus creates a creole continuum, ranging from an acrolect (a version of the creole that is very similar to the prestige language), to mesolects (decreasingly similar versions), to the basilect (the most "conservative" creole). An example of decreolization described by Hock and Joseph is African American Vernacular English (AAVE), in which older, more conservative versions preserve features such as the completive marker done while newer, less conservative versions do not.

Some instances of contact between languages with different prestige levels have resulted in diglossia, a phenomenon in which a community uses a high prestige language or dialect in certain situations, usually for newspapers, in literature, on university campuses, for religious ceremonies, and on television and the radio, but uses a low prestige language or dialect for other situations, often in conversation in the home or in letters, comic strips, and in popular culture. Linguist Charles A. Ferguson's 1959 article "Diglossia" listed the following examples of diglossic societies: in the Middle East and North Africa, Standard Arabic and vernacular Arabics; in Greece, Katharevousa and Dhimotiki; in Switzerland, Swiss Standard German and Swiss German; and in Haiti, Standard French and Haitian Creole. In most African countries, a European language serves as the official, prestige language (Standard French, English, Portuguese), while local languages (Wolof, Bambara, Yoruba) or creoles (Ivorian French, Nigerian English) serve as everyday languages of communication.

In diglossic societies, the prestigious language tends to conservatively resist change over time while the low-prestige language, the local vernacular, undergoes normal language change. For instance, Latin, the high prestige language of Europe for many centuries, underwent minimal change while the everyday low prestige spoken languages evolved significantly. If, however, the two languages are spoken freely, the prestige language may undergo vernacularization and begin to incorporate vernacular features. An example is Sanskrit, an ancient prestige language that has incorporated the vernacular pronunciations of [tʃ] and [b] for word-initial y- and v-.

The prestige language may also change under the influence of specific regional dialects in a process known as regionalization. For example, in medieval times, Ecclesiastical Latin developed different forms in countries such as Italy, France, Portugal, Spain, Catalonia, as well as other Roman Catholic nations, notably in pronunciation – see Latin regional pronunciation. Some of these differences were minor, such as c before i and e being pronounced [tʃ] in Italy but [s] in France, but after English underwent the Great Vowel Shift between 1200 and 1600, the vowel system in England became nearly unrecognizable to its European ecclesiastic counterparts.

== See also ==
- Cultural cringe
- Dialect levelling
- Language attrition
- Language planning and policy in Singapore
- Linguistic imperialism
- List of prestige dialects
- Raciolinguistics
- Vergonha

== General and cited references ==
- Abu-Haidar, Farida (December 1989). "Are Iraqi Women More Prestige Conscious than Men? Sex Differentiation in Baghdadi Arabic". Language in Society. 18 (4): 471–481. doi:10.1017/S0047404500013865. JSTOR 4168077. S2CID 145776668.
- Angle, John; Hesse-Biber, Sharlene (April 1981). "Gender and Prestige Preference in Language". Sex Roles. 7 (4): 449–461. doi:10.1007/BF00288072. S2CID 143847747.
- Bauer, Laurie (1998). "Myth 16: You Shouldn't Say 'It is Me' because 'Me' is Accusative". In Laurie Bauer and Peter Trudgill (ed.). Language Myths. London: Penguin Books. pp. 132–137. ISBN 978-0140260236.
- Chambers, Jack K.; Trudgill, Peter (1998). Dialectology. Cambridge: University of Cambridge Press. ISBN 978-0-521-59646-6.
- Eckert, Penelope; Rickford, John R., eds. (2002). Style and Sociolinguistic Variation. Cambridge: Cambridge University Press.
- Fasold, Ralph (1990). The Sociolinguistics of Language. Cambridge, MA: Wiley-Blackwell. ISBN 978-0-631-13825-9.
- Fasold, Ralph W.; Connor-Linton, Jeff (2006). An Introduction to Language and Linguistics. Cambridge: Cambridge University Press. ISBN 978-0-521-84768-1.
- Ferguson, Charles A. (1959). "Diglossia". Word. 15 (2): 325–340. doi:10.1080/00437956.1959.11659702. S2CID 239352211.
- Fox, Margalit (1999-09-12). "The Way We Live Now: 9-12-99: On Language; Dialects". The New York Times.
- Gordon, Elizabeth (March 1997). "Sex, Speech, and Stereotypes: Why Women Use Prestige Speech Forms More than Men". Language in Society. 26 (1): 47–63. doi:10.1017/S0047404500019400. JSTOR 4168749. S2CID 145780489.
- Gumperz, John (August 1958). "Dialect Differences and Social Stratification in a North Indian Village" (PDF). American Anthropologist. New Series. 60 (4): 668–682. doi:10.1525/aa.1958.60.4.02a00050. JSTOR 665673.
- Haeri, Niloofar (2003). Sacred Language, Ordinary People: Dilemmas of Culture and Politics in Egypt. Palgrave Macmillan. ISBN 978-0312238971.
- Haugen, Einar (August 1966a). "Dialect, Language, Nation". American Anthropologist. 68 (4): 922–935. doi:10.1525/aa.1966.68.4.02a00040. JSTOR 670407.
- Haugen, Einar (1966b). "Semicommunication: The language gap in Scandinavia". Sociological Inquiry. 36 (2): 280–297. doi:10.1111/j.1475-682X.1966.tb00630.x.
- Hock, Hans Henrich; Joseph, Brian D. (1996). Language History, Language Change, and Language Relationship: An Introduction to Historical and Comparative Linguistics. Walter de Gruyter. ISBN 978-3-11-014785-8.
- Hymes, Dell (1971). "Sociolinguistics and the ethnography of speaking". In Edwin Ardener (ed.). Social Anthropology and Language. London: Routledge. pp. 47–92. ISBN 978-0422737005.
- Ibrahim, Muhammad H. (Spring 1986). "Standard and Prestige Language: A Problem in Arabic Sociolinguistics". Anthropological Linguistics. 28 (1): 115–126. JSTOR 30027950.
- Jenkins, Siona (2001). Egyptian Arabic Phrasebook. Lonely Planet.
- Kahane, Henry (September 1986). "A Typology of the Prestige Language". Language. 62 (3): 495–508. doi:10.2307/415474. JSTOR 415474.
- Kiesling, Scott F. (1998). "Men's Identities and Sociolinguistic Variation: The Case of Fraternity Men". Journal of Sociolinguistics. 2: 69–99. doi:10.1111/1467-9481.00031. Archived from the original on 2017-10-11.
- Kloss, Heinz (1966). "Types of Multilingual Communities: A Discussion of Ten Variables". Sociological Inquiry. 36 (2): 135–145. doi:10.1111/j.1475-682X.1966.tb00621.x.
- Kordić, Snježana (2014). Lengua y Nacionalismo [Language and Nationalism] (in Spanish). Madrid: Euphonía Ediciones. p. 416. ISBN 978-84-936668-8-0. OL 16814702W. CROSBI 694545. Archived from the original on 3 November 2019.
- Kroch, Anthony (April 1978). "Toward a Theory of Social Dialect Variation". Language in Society. 7 (1): 17–36. doi:10.1017/S0047404500005315. JSTOR 4166972. S2CID 143516854.
- Labov, William (2006). The Social Stratification of English in New York. Cambridge: University of Cambridge Press. ISBN 978-0-521-82122-3.
- Leith, Dick (1997). A Social History of English. London: Routledge. ISBN 978-0-415-16456-6.
- McDavid, Raven (December 1946). "Dialect Geography and Social Science Problems". Social Forces. 25 (2): 168–172. doi:10.2307/2571555. JSTOR 2571555.
- Niedzielski, Nancy A.; Preston, Dennis Richard (2003). Folk Linguistics. Berlin: Mouton de Gruyter. ISBN 978-3-11-017554-7.
- O'Grady, William; Archibald, John; Aronoff, Mark; Rees-Miller, Janie (2001). Contemporary Linguistics. Boston: Bedford St. Martin's. ISBN 9780312247386.
- Preston, Dennis R. (1996). "Whaddayaknow? The Modes of Folk Linguistic Awareness". Language Awareness. 5: 40–74. doi:10.1080/09658416.1996.9959890.
- Seabrook, David (2005-11-14). "The Academy: Talking the Tawk". The New Yorker.
- Trudgill, Peter (1992). "Ausbau sociolinguistics and the perception of language status in contemporary Europe". International Journal of Applied Linguistics. 2 (2): 167–177. doi:10.1111/j.1473-4192.1992.tb00031.x.
- Trudgill, Peter (October 1972). "Sex, Covert Prestige and Linguistic Change in the Urban British English of Norwich". Language in Society. 1 (2): 175–195. doi:10.1017/S0047404500000488. JSTOR 4166683.
- Wang, Limei; Ladegaard, Hans J. (2008). "Language Attitudes and Gender in China: Perceptions and Reported Use of Putonghua and Cantonese in the Southern Province of Guangdong". Language Awareness. 17 (1): 57–77. doi:10.2167/la425.0. S2CID 145146740.
- Wardhaugh, Ronald (2006). An Introduction to Sociolinguistics. Blackwell Publishing. ISBN 978-1-4051-3559-7.
- Winford, Donald (2003). An Introduction to Contact Linguistics. Wiley. ISBN 978-0-631-21251-5.
