= Jenny Cheshire =

British linguist

Jenny L. Cheshire is a British sociolinguist and emeritus professor of linguistics at Queen Mary University of London. Her research interests include language variation and change, language contact and dialect convergence, and language in education, with a focus on conversational narratives and spoken English. She is most known for her work on grammatical variation, especially syntax and discourse structures, in adolescent speech and on Multicultural London English.

== Career highlights ==
Cheshire completed the Certificat pratique de langue française at the Sorbonne in Paris. She earned her B.A. at the London School of Economics and her Ph.D. at the University of Reading. She has been a lecturer at the University of Bath and University of Reading, a lecturer and then senior lecturer at Birkbeck College London from 1983–91, and professor of English linguistics at the University of Fribourg and the University of Neuchâtel, Switzerland from 1991-96. She is currently professor emeritus of linguistics at Queen Mary, University of London.

Since 2013 she has been the editor-in-chief of the prestigious peer-reviewed journal Language in Society. She has also served on the editorial boards for: Lynx, Te Reo, English World-Wide, International Journal of Applied Linguistics, Journal of Multilingual and Multicultural Development, Journal of Sociolinguistics, Language and Education, Multilingua.

Cheshire was elected as Fellow of the British Academy for the Humanities and Social Sciences in 2011. To honor her contribution to the field of Sociolinguistics, in 2011, Queen Mary, University of London set up the Jenny Cheshire Sociolinguistics Lecture Series.

== Research awards ==
Cheshire has received numerous research awards recognising her significant contributions to the field of sociolinguistics:

- European Commission: 'ATheME: Advancing the Multilingual Experience' in collaboration with Adger, Borer, Stockall and Cotter (2014-2019).
- Economic and Social Research Council: multiple awards with respect to her research on Multicultural London English, in collaboration with Kerswill, Williams, Fox, Gardner-Chloros, Birkbeck, and Gadet (2004-2007, 2007-2010 and 2010-2014 and 2010-2011).
- British Association for Applied Linguistics: 'Applying Linguistics,' in collaboration with Sue Fox (2012).
- Arts and Humanities Research Council: 'The Grammar of Spontaneous Spoken English' (2000-2001).

She has also served as a reviewer for many research grant applications from such organisation as: UK Economic and Social Research Council; AHRB/AHRC; Leverhulme Trust, British Academy; Canadian Social Science Research Council; New Zealand Foundation for Research, Science and Technology; New Zealand Public Good Research Council; Swiss Fonds National; USA National Science Foundation; Canadian National Science Foundation.

== Notable contributions ==
Following are some of Cheshire's most notable contributions to the field of sociolinguistics:

- Multicultural London English: principal investigator, working with Paul Kerswill and others, in identifying and defining a new typological language variety, multiethnolect, spoken by young, working-class people in London as well as by multiethnic youth across Europe, including Scandinavia, the Netherlands, Belgium, Germany, and France.
- Adolescent Friendship Groups: Cheshire, Kerswill, Fox and Torgersen (2008) showed that adolescent ethnicity interacts with patterns of friendship to create dense, multi-ethnic "friendship networks" which determine an individual's "choice and degree of use of certain linguistic features". In addition, these researchers identified "a cluster of life-style indicators which seem to be shared by most of the individuals [identified] as potential linguistic innovators."
- Syntactic Variation: Through multiple variationist studies, Cheshire has shown how analysing the social distribution of a variable syntactic construction sheds light on the nature of pragmatic functions, which provides more insights into the social aspects of language use. Cheshire et al. have shown the syntactic variation is of a very different nature than phonological or morphological variation. 'Syntax is so central to the construction of discourse that we have to look beyond any superficial alternation to examine what speakers do with their grammar – in other words, to focus on social interaction'.
- Dialect Levelling: Cheshire, Kerswill, Williams, along with many others, have uncovered significant amounts of dialect levelling in Britain, i.e., "the replacement of local features by others with a wider geographical currency," through the increased use of non-standard variants in phonology, morphology and syntax occurring throughout the major urban centres of Britain.
- World English: Cheshire's edited volume on English around the World brings together varieties of English across 60 countries, covering such typologically distinct varieties as standard English, non-standard dialects, pidgins, creoles, and new Englishes, and describes how linguistic variation and change is happening on a far greater scale than has ever been seen in the world's linguistic history.

== Selected publications ==
Among her publications, she has written over ten academic books and over 90 articles in peer-reviewed international research journals and edited collections. Following are some of her most notable publications:

- 1982. Variation in an English dialect: a sociolinguistic study. Cambridge/New York: Cambridge University Press.
- 1989. (ed.) Dialect and education: Some European perspectives (Vol. 53). Multilingual Matters.
- 1991. (ed.) English around the world: sociolinguistic perspectives. Cambridge/New York: Cambridge University Press.
- 1994. (with David Graddol and Joan Swann) Describing language. 2nd ed, Buckingham/Philadelphia: Open University Press.
- 1997. (ed. with Dieter Stein) Taming the vernacular: from dialect to written standard language. London/New York: Longman.
- 1998. (ed. with Peter Trudgill) The Sociolinguistics Reader. London/New York: Arnold.
- 1999. Taming the Vernacular: Some Repercussions for the Study of Syntactic Variation and Spoken Grammar. Te Reo. 8:59-80.
- 2002. "Sex and Gender in Variationist Research." The handbook of language variation and change (2002): 423-443.
- 2003. (ed. with David Britain) Social dialectology: in honour of Peter Trudgill. Amsterdam/Philadelphia: John Benjamins Publishing.
- 2005. (with Kerswill, P. and Williams, A.) Phonology, grammar and discourse in dialect convergence. In P. Auer, P., F. Hinskens, and P. Kerswill, (eds.) Dialect Change: The convergence and Divergence of Dialects in Contemporary Societies. Cambridge: Cambridge University Press, pp. 135–167.
- 2005. Age and generation-specific use of language. In U. Ammon, N. Dittmar, K. Mattheier and P. Trudgill (eds.) Sociolinguistics: An Introductory Handbook of the Science of Language and Society. Berlin: Mouton de Gruyter, pp. 1552–1563.
- 2007. (with Fox, S, Kerswill, P, and Torgersen, E.) Linguistic innovators: the English of adolescents in London. Final Report submitted to the Economic and Social Research Council.
- 2008. (with Fox, S., Kerswill, P. and Torgersen, E.) Ethnicity, friendship network and social practices as the motor of dialect change: linguistic innovation in London. Sociolinguistica 22: 1-23.
- 2009. Syntactic variation and beyond. In N. Coupland and A. Jaworski (eds.) The New Sociolinguistics Reader. Basingstoke: Palgrave Macmillan, pp. 119–135.
- 2011. (with Kerswill, P., Fox, S. and Torgersen, E.) Contact, the feature pool and the speech community: The emergence of Multicultural London English. Journal of Sociolinguistics, 15(2), pp. 151–196.
- 2015. (with Nortier, J, and Adger, D). Emerging Multiethnolects in Europe. Queen Mary's Occasional Papers Advancing Linguistics. 33:1-27.
