= Atlas Linguarum Europae =

The Atlas Linguarum Europae (literally Atlas of the Languages of Europe, ALE in acronym) is a linguistic atlas project launched in 1970 with the help of UNESCO, and published from 1975 to 2015. The ALE used its own phonetic transcription system, based on the International Phonetic Alphabet with some modifications. It covers six language families present on the European continent: Altaic, Basque, Indo-European, Caucasian, Semitic and Uralic; these families are divided into 22 linguistic groups comprising 90 languages and dialects. The data were collected in 2631 localities. The members of the ALE project are organized into 47 national committees and 4 committees for minority languages.

Roman Jakobson proposed a linguistic atlas for Europe in the late 1930s, but World War II disrupted this plan. The idea was revived by Mario Alinei at the Second International Congress of Dialectologists in 1965, and Alinei was still President of the ALE as late as 1997. Wolfgang Viereck took over as president between 1999 and 2005, and was then followed by Nicolae Saramandu. Alinei developed a theory that much of language is based on "magico-religious motivations", which he believed pre-dated the spread of Christianity and Islam to Europe. Viereck later wrote on the influence of religion on language.

It was the first computerised linguistic atlas. In England, the 66 sites had all been part of the earlier Survey of English Dialects. Viereck noted that the 1970s fieldwork of the ALE demonstrated widespread lexical erosion in English dialects since the SED (e.g. the word "icicle" had become universal in England and displaced other dialect words). Work in Ireland, Scotland and Wales covered both Celtic and Germanic dialects. The Germanic dialects of Scotland were classified as Scots, whereas those of Ireland and Wales were classified as English. Work in the Channel Islands only investigated Romance dialects.

An article by the Yorkshire Dialect Society noted the troubled history of the survey in England and Wales. J. D. A. Widdowson had initially said that there were not the resources to do the survey domestically, but he was persuaded to take part after the persistence of Toon Weijnen. The results for Britain and Ireland have hardly been analysed. As of 2023, the ALE committee still has representation for Gaelic, Irish, Manx, Scots and Welsh but not for English. A publication by Clive Upton and J.D.A. Widdowson noted widespread lexical erosion between the Survey of English Dialects and the ALE.

Some of the fieldwork notes for England and all of that for Wales have been uploaded to the Internet Archive's collection for dialects of English and Scots.

In March 2026, the British Library released online digitised recordings of the interviews in England and Wales, although a few could not be uploaded for technical reasons.

== Publications ==
- Atlas Linguarum Europae: Introduction, Assen: Van Gorcum, 1975.
- Atlas Linguarum Europae: First Questionnaire, Assen: Van Gorcum, 1976.
- Atlas Linguarum Europae: Second Questionnaire, Assen: Van Gorcum, 1979.
- Atlas Linguarum Europae, volume I: first fascicle, maps and comments, Assen: Van Gorcum, 1983.
- Atlas Linguarum Europae, volume I: second fascicle, maps and commentaries, Assen / Maastricht: Van Gorcum, 1986.
- Atlas Linguarum Europae, volume I: third fascicle, maps and comments, Assen: Van Gorcum, 1988.
- Atlas Linguarum Europae, volume I: fourth fascicle, maps and comments. Assen / Maastricht: Van Gorcum, 1990.
- Atlas Linguarum Europae, volume I: fifth fascicle, maps and commentaries, Roma: Poligrafico, 1997.
- Atlas Linguarum Europae New Perspectives in Geolinguistics, Roma: Poligrafico, 1997.
- Atlas Linguarum Europae, volume I: sixth fascicle, maps and commentaries, Roma: Poligrafico, 2002.
- Atlas Linguarum Europae, volume I: seventh fascicle, maps and commentaries, Roma: Poligrafico, 2007.
- Atlas Linguarum Europae, volume I: eighth fascicle, comments, Bucharest: Editura Universității din București, 2014
- Atlas Linguarum Europae, volume I: eighth fascicle, European linguistic maps, Bucharest: Editura Universității din București, 2014
- Atlas Linguarum Europae, volume I: ninth fascicle, comments, Bucharest: Editura Universității din București, 2015
- Atlas Linguarum Europae, volume I: ninth fascicle, European linguistic maps, Bucharest: Editura Universității din București, 2015

== Bibliography ==
- "Atlas Linguarum Europae". Institutul de Lingvistică, Academia Română. lingv.ro.
- "Atlas of the European Languages (ALE)". Centro de Linguística da Universidade de Lisboa. 2013.
- Alinei, Mario (1997). "Magico-Religious Motivations in European Dialects: A Contribution to Archaeolinguistics". Dialectologia et Geolinguistica. 5.
- Aveyard, Edward (2023). "The Atlas Linguarum Europae in Great Britain and the Republic of Ireland". Transactions of the Yorkshire Dialect Society: 3–11.
- Caprini, Rita (1996). "Conference reports / Rapports de congrès / Konferenzberichte". Dialectologia et Geolinguistica. 4.
- Čižmárová, Libuše (2006). "Reports - Rapports - Berichte". Dialectologia et Geolinguistica. 14.
- Eder, Birgit (2003). Ausgewählte Verwandtschaftsbezeichnungen in den Sprachen Europas. Hamburg, Germany: Peter Lang. ISBN 9783631528730.
- Shorrocks, Graham (1997). "Conference reports / Rapports de congrès / Konferenzberichte". Dialectologia et Geolinguistica. 5.
- Tuaillon, Gaston (1981). "L'Atlas Linguarum Europae : " Éclair "". Vox Romanica (40).
- Viereck, Wolfgang (1987). "Atlas Linguarum Europae. Edited by Mario Alinei et al. Vol. 1: Cartes, deuxième fascicule; Commentaires, deuxième fascicule. Assen, The Netherlands: Van Gorcum. 1986. cxiii + 230". Journal of English Linguistics. 20 (1): 145–149.
- Viereck, Wolfgang (2006a). "The Atlas Linguarum Europae - A Brief Presentation". Dialectologia et Geolinguistica. 2006 (14): 104–110. doi:10.1515/dig.2006.2006.14.104. S2CID 144202215.
- Viereck, Wolfgang (2006b). "The Linguistic and Cultural Significance of the Atlas Linguarum Europae" (PDF). 言語情報学研究 (9).
