= Gheorghe Șincai National College (Bucharest) =

High school in Bucharest, Romania

Coordinates: 44.4141°N 26.1039°E

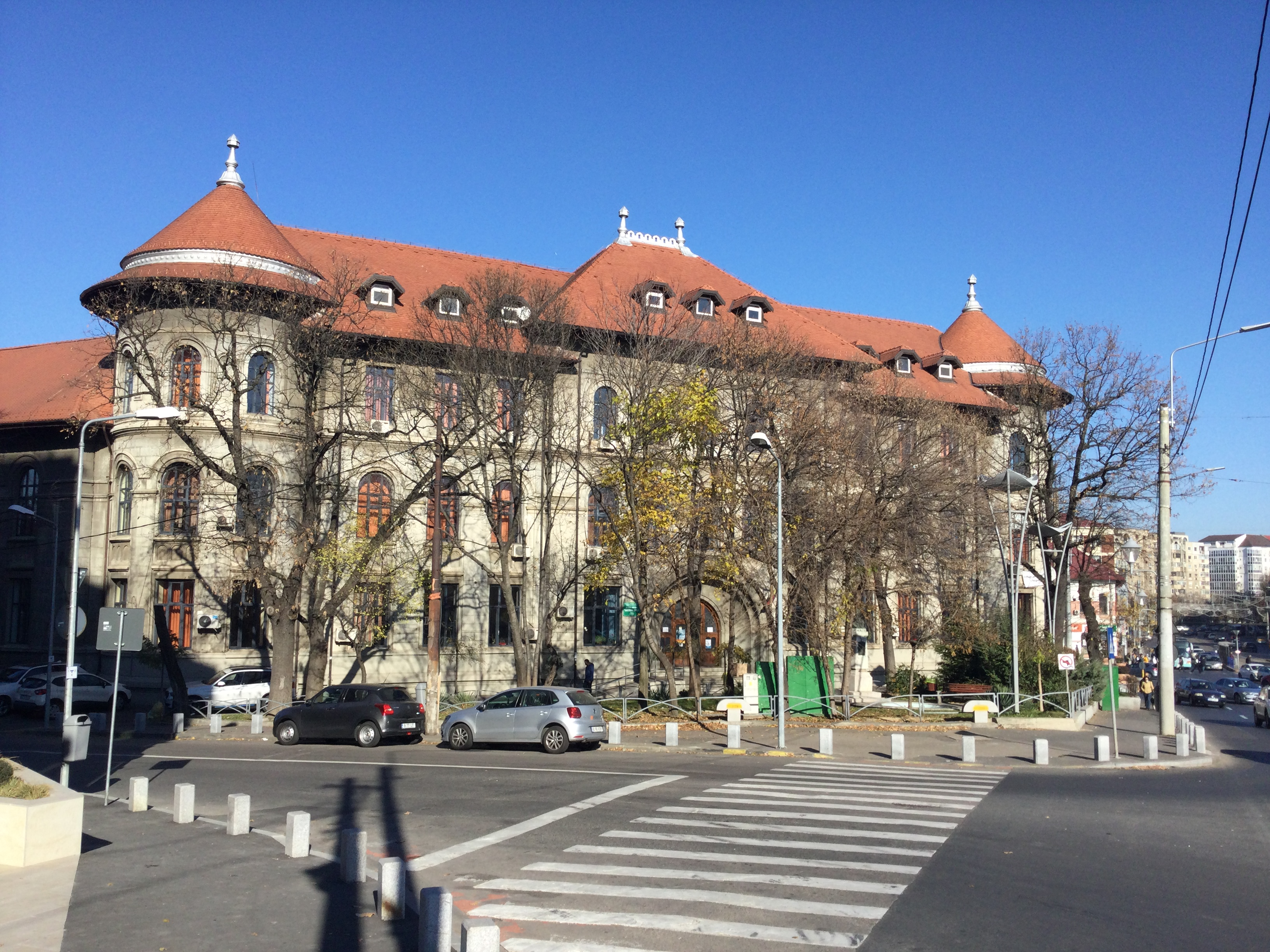
Gheorghe Șincai National College

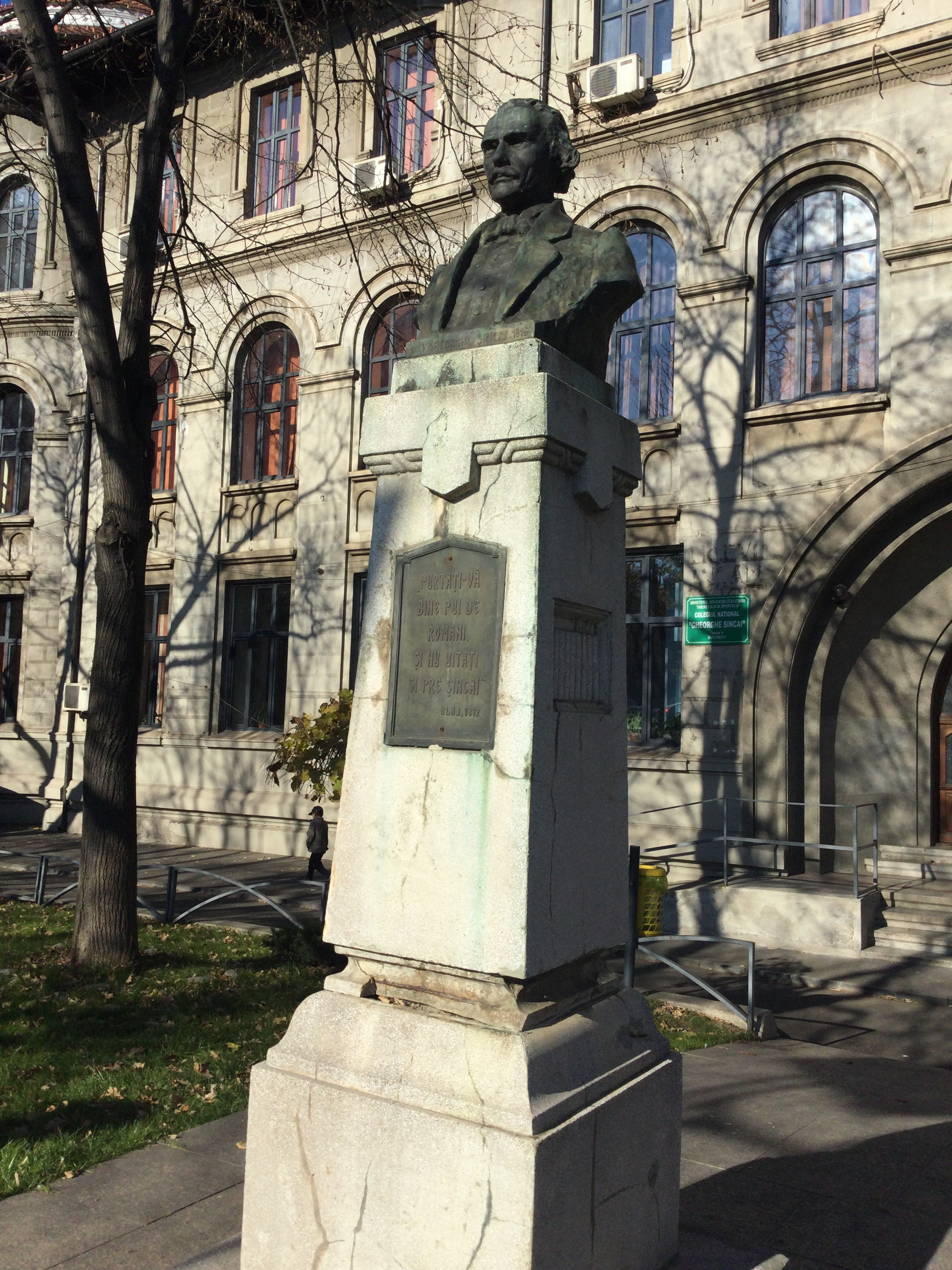
Monument to Șincai

Gheorghe Șincai National College (Romanian: Colegiul Național Gheorghe Șincai) is a high school located at 167 Calea Șerban Vodă, Bucharest, Romania.

== History ==
The school traces its origins to autumn 1890, when two classes were split off from the overcrowded Matei Basarab High School. Another class was added a year later. A royal decree issued in December 1892 by Education Minister Take Ionescu established the institution as a classical gymnasium. Upon the proposal of a teacher from Transylvania, it was named after Gheorghe Șincai. It became a high school in 1919.

The present building was begun in 1924, and was ready for use in 1928. In 1948, the new communist regime dropped the Șincai name, which was restored in 1957. Meanwhile, a girls’ high school functioned in the same building until 1956, when the two were merged. Șincai was declared a national college in 2002.

The school building is listed as a historic monument by Romania's Ministry of Culture and Religious Affairs, as is the sculpture of Șincai by Ion Schmidt-Faur, in front of the school entrance.

== Faculty ==
- Vladimir Cavarnali
- Traian Lalescu
- I. M. Rașcu
- Octav Șuluțiu

== Alumni ==
- Florența Albu
- Constantin Beldie
- Mihail Diaconescu
- Mihu Dragomir
- David Emmanuel
- Paula Ivan
- Gheorghe Mihoc
- Gică Petrescu
- Constantin Rădulescu
- Nicolae Saramandu
