= Dialect levelling =

Means by which dialect differences decrease

Dialect levelling (or leveling in American English) is an overall reduction in the variation or diversity of a dialect's features when in contact with one or more other dialects. This can come about through assimilation, mixture, and merging of certain dialects, often amidst a process of language codification, which can be a precursor to standardization. One possible result is a koine language, in which various dialects mix together and simplify, settling into a new and more widely embraced form of the language. Another possible path is that a speech community increasingly adopts or exclusively preserves features with widespread social currency at the expense of their more local or traditional dialect features.

Dialect levelling has been observed in most languages with large numbers of speakers after industrialization and modernization of the areas in which they are spoken. However, while less common, it could be observed in pre-industrial times too, especially in colonial dialects like American and Australian English or when sustained linguistic contact between different dialects over a large geographical area continues for long enough as in the Hellenistic world that produced Koine Greek as a result of dialect leveling from Ancient Greek dialects.

== Definition ==
Dialect levelling has been defined as the process by which structural variation in dialects is reduced, "the process of eliminating prominent stereotypical features of differences between dialects", "a social process [that] consists in negotiation between speakers of different dialects aimed at setting the properties of, for example, a lexical entry", "the reduction of variation between dialects of the same language in situations where speakers of these dialects are brought together", "the eradication of socially or locally marked variants (both within and between linguistic systems) in conditions of social or geographical mobility and resultant dialect contact", and the "reduction... of structural similarities between languages in contact", of which "interference and convergence are really two manifestations".

Leonard Bloomfield implicitly distinguished between the short-term process of accommodation between speakers and the long-term process of levelling between varieties and between the social and the geographical dimensions. On the geographical dimension, levelling may disrupt the regularity that is the result of the application of sound laws. It operates in waves but may leave behind relic forms. Dialect levelling and Mischung, or dialect mixing, have been suggested as the key mechanisms that destroy regularity and the alleged exceptionlessness of sound laws.

Dialect levelling is triggered by contact between dialects, often because of migration, and it has been observed in most languages with large numbers of speakers after the industrialisation and the modernisation of the area or areas in which they are spoken. It results in unique features of dialects being eliminated and "may occur over several generations until a stable compromise dialect develops". It is separate from the levelling of variation between dialectal or vernacular versions of a language and standard versions.

== Motivations ==
Contact leading to dialect levelling can stem from geographical and social mobility, which brings together speakers from different regions and social levels. Adolescents can drive levelling, as they adapt their speech under the influence of their peers, rather than their parents.

In 20th-century British English, dialect levelling was caused by social upheaval leading to larger social networks. Agricultural advancements caused movement from rural to urban areas, and the construction of suburbs caused city-dwellers to return to former rural areas. The World Wars brought women into the workforce and men into contact with more diverse backgrounds.

While written and spoken language can diverge significantly, the presence of long distance communication – which prior to inventions such as the telephone was virtually always written – usually drives or necessitates the use of a lingua franca, dialect levelling or both. To be understood by their correspondence partners farther away, authors will naturally tend to reduce exceedingly local forms and incorporate loanwords from the dialect of the person they're writing to. If enough such correspondence is undertaken over a long enough time frame by enough people a new written standard or de facto standard can emerge. Examples include Middle Low German as employed by the Hanseatic League or Koine Greek. In the absence of long distance communication and travel, languages and dialects can diverge significantly in comparatively short time spans.

== Role in creole formation ==
It has been suggested that dialect levelling plays a role in the formation of creoles. It is responsible for standardising the multiple language variants that are produced by the relexification of substrate languages with words from the lexifier language. Features that are not common to all of the substrata and so are different across the varieties of the emerging creole tend to be eliminated. The process begins "when the speakers of the creole community stop targeting the lexifier language and start targeting the relexified lexicons, that is, the early creole". Dialect levelling in such a situation may not be complete, however. Variation that remains after dialect levelling may result in the "reallocation" of surviving variants to "new functions, such as stylistic or social markers". Also, differences between substrata, including between dialects of a single substratum, may not be levelled at all but instead persist, as differences between dialects of the creole.

== Case studies ==
=== In New Zealand English ===
New Zealand English is a relatively new native variety of English. The English language was brought to the islands in 1800 but became influential only in the 1840s because of large-scale migration from Britain. The most distinctive part of the language is the formation of the accent that has developed through complex series of processes involving dialect contact between different varieties of British English, followed by dialect mixture. Although New Zealand English sounds very similar to Australian English, it is not a direct transplant, as Australians were only 7% of the immigrants before 1881, and the majority of the linguistic change in New Zealand English happened between 1840 and 1880. The speed with which New Zealand English became a unique, independent form of English can be attributed to the diversity of speakers who came into contact through colonisation. Features from all over the British Isles and the Māori people, who had inhabited the island for 600 years prior to colonisation, can be identified in the form that New Zealand English has taken.

Rudimentary levelling in New Zealand English occurred around 1860, the result of contact between adult speakers of different regional and social varieties and the accommodation that was required from the speakers in face-to-face interaction. Settlements attracted people from all walks of life and created highly-diverse linguistic variation, but there were still families that lived in almost total isolation. Thus, the children did not gain the dialect of their peers, as was normally expected, but instead maintained the dialect of their parents. Speakers who grow up in that type of situation are more likely to demonstrate intra-individual variability than speakers whose main source of influence is their peers. When the emerging dialect stabilises, it is the result of a focusing process, which allowed for a very small amount of regional variation.

New Zealand English is largely based around the typology and forms of southeastern England because of the levelling out of demographic minority dialect forms. Trudgill (1986) suggests that situations that involve transplantation and contact between mutually-intelligible dialects lead to the development of new dialects by focusing on specific qualities from the variants of the different dialects and reducing them until only one feature remains from each variable. The process may take an extended length of time. Reduction then takes place as the result of group accommodation between speakers in face-to-face interaction. Accommodation may also lead to the development of interdialectal forms, forms that are not present in contributing dialects but may be the result of hyperadaptation.

==== Vowels ====
- Variables have been maintained through the process of levelling, such as the vowels of foot and strut indicate a system of five, rather than six, short checked vowels, a feature common in working-class accents in most of England north of the Bristol Channel, an area that encompasses about half of England's geography and population. However, only one consultant had the feature, indicating that it was likely a minority feature in adults and was then exposed to children.
- /a:/ has levelled from realisations all over an utterance to being found in front realisations only.
- Closed variants [i, e, ɛ] (typical of 19th-century Southern England) are more common in the recordings, rather than the open variants of Northern England, Scotland and Ireland [ɛ, æ]. The fact that the close variants have survived suggests an influence from southeastern England, Australia and Scotland.
- Diphthong shift is equivalent to diphthongs from Southern England to the West Midlands. Most of diphthong shift happens along /au/, starting at a point that is close to [æ] or /ai/ starting farther back than /a:/

==== Consonants ====
- /h/-dropping did not survive in New Zealand English, and the merger of /w/ and /ʍ/ is only now beginning to emerge.
- Irish English dental /t/ and /d/ have been levelled out in New Zealand English, in favour of /θ/ and /ð/.

=== In Limburg ===
In this case study, Hinskens (1998) researches dialect levelling in the Dutch province of Limburg. Based on his findings, he argues that dialect levelling does not necessarily lead to convergence towards the standard language. The research for this case study takes place in Rimburg, a small village on the southeast of Limburg, where Ripuarian dialects are spoken. The southeast area of Limburg experienced rapid industrialisation at the turn of the 20th century with the largescale development of coal mining. That created job opportunities, which led to considerable immigration to the area (Hinskens:38), which, in turn, led to language contact and a diversification of language varieties. It is the area where most of the dialect levelling occurred.

Geographically, the dialects of Limburg are divided into three zones. The westernmost zone (C-zone) features East-Limburg dialects, the easternmost zone (A-zone) Ripuarian dialects, with the central zone (B-zone) being a transition zone between the two varieties. As one travels from west to east, the dialect features deviate more and more from the standard language. Additionally, the dialect features accumulate from west to east and features found in East-Limburg dialects are also found in Ripuarian dialects but not the other way around (Hinskens 1998:37).

The study analysed dialect features from all three zones, among which are the following:

- /t/ deletion is typical to all three zones
- derivational suffix -lɪɣ marks the A/B-zone dialects; C-zone dialects and the standard language have -lɪk
- postlexical ɣ-weakening is typical of the dialects in the A-zone

The study found that "the ratio of dialect features showing overall loss to dialect features investigated decreases with increasing geographical distribution" (Hinskels:43).

In other words, the wider the distribution of the dialectal feature, the less likely that it will level with the standard language. For example, dialectal features found in all three zones, such as /t/ deletion, were maintained, and features such as the postlexical ɣ-weakening, which occurs only in the Ripuarian dialects (A-zone), were lost.

Of the 21 features that are analysed, 14 lost dialect distinctions. Some of the features that were levelled did not lead to convergence toward the standard language and, in some cases, there was even divergence (Hinksens:45).

One feature that is a marker for only the Rimburg dialect, which occurs in the A-zone, is the non-palatalisation of the epenthetic /s/ in the diminutive suffix:

Rimburg dialect	B-zone	Standard Dutch	gloss
dijisko	dijijko	dingetje	'thing'-DIM
kʌkskə	kʌkʃkə	koekje	'cookie'
kʀeːəçskə	kʀeːəçʃkə	kraagje	'collar'-DIM

"Rimburg dialect is in the process of adopting the morpho-phonemics of the surrounding B-zone dialects," rather than Standard Dutch (Hinskens:27). Dialect levelling in this case cannot be explained in terms of convergence with the standard language.

The study concludes that dialect levelling resulted from accommodation. "Accommodation and dialect levelling should be understood in the light of the continuous struggle between... the tendencies towards unification on the one hand and those towards particularism and cultural fragmentation on the other" (Hinskens:42). Those who spoke the same dialect were part of the in-group, and those who spoke a different variety were part of the out-group. Based on conversation data, Hinskens found that "the more typical/unique a dialect feature is for a speaker's dialect, the larger the relative number of linguistic conditions in which the use of this dialect feature is suppressed in out-group contact situations". (Hinskens:41). Accommodation, or suppression of dialect features, then facilitates mutual comprehension and results in the convergence of dialect features.

=== Standard German ===
The emergence of Standard German was a complicated process because no German dialect had significantly more prestige than any other – partly due to political fractionation. Only relatively recently has a dialect attained sufficient prestige for it to be widely adopted. Old High German (OHG) is an umbrella term to encompass what are in reality numerous divergent dialects – sometimes with hardly any mutual intelligibility. While it was without a doubt *þiudisk, that is the language of common folk (*þiudisk is the origin of the modern words deutsch and Dutch), it was not a useful means of long distance communication. Few people could read and write, parchment was expensive and those who could write usually read enough Latin to bridge the dialect gap that way – similar to how Dutch and German people may communicate with one another in English to bridge the dialect gap nowadays. Nonetheless, some monasteries and the Carolingian court did produce some vernacular writing, most of which was lost, but the remains of which form almost the entirety of the OHG corpus. After 1022 little written material in the vernacular was produced for a century, so a significantly changed language would reemerge when vernacular writing resumed. Any even tentative hints of dialect leveling in the OHG period were in essence reset to zero. What is now called Middle High German was still clearly divided into dialects (e.g. the Niebelungenlied was written in a Bavarian dialect) but due to the prestige of the Hohenstaufen dynasty a certain convergence can be observed in the language used by authors enjoying imperial patronage. Court poetry, particularly Minnesang and epic poetry, enjoyed a particularly high prestige and Walter von der Vogelweide, Wolfram von Eschenbach (author of Parzival) and others while all but forgotten a few centuries after their death were "re-discovered" by 19th century romantic nationalists and have enjoyed enduring popularity ever since. However, with the end of the Hohenstaufen, centralizing tendencies in both politics and linguistics came to a halt in the Holy Roman Empire and there was no longer an imperial patronage for poetry. Interestingly, the Hohenstaufen era dialect leveling seemed to converge on a standard with some elements in common with modern Alemanic. Today the Alemanic-derived Swiss German is often deemed the most divergent dialect under the Standard German Dachsprache. There is today a clear distinction between "High German" dialects which had undergone the Second Germanic consonant shift and "Low German" dialects which had not. However, this dichotomy oversimplifies matters as it ignores the "Middle German" dialects which sit on the "Low German" side of some isoglosses and the "High German" side of others. The dialect continuum only started to break down, when standard languages started to replace the vernaculars, but to contemporary sources dialects in all parts of the continuum were "deutsch" which helps explain misleading names like Pennsylvania Dutch which descends from a Middle German dialect unrelated to the current day Netherlands.

Standardization did not get fully underway until 13th-century Franciscans began a push to establish a literate public; however, at this time, 70% of the materials produced were in Medieval Latin, as opposed to German. 14th-century city-dwellers were far more parochial than their poetic forebears, but there were some linguistic links within the realm of commerce, as newer cities would look to established cities for law codes and the Hanseatic League, in the north of modern Germany, developed a form of German specifically for business. The lingua franca of much of the Baltic Sea Coast in the heyday of the Hanse was Middle Low German. However, as the Hanseatic League began to weaken by the 16th century, its potential to drive linguistic unity was reduced.

During the 14th and 15th centuries, the language underwent a massive phonological shift, and these changes are still visible linguistic features today. Eastern Central Germany was at the center of the changes and became a linguistically uniform area, which set it apart from other parts of the German-speaking world that remained linguistically diverse. The Viennese imperial chancellery introduced influential spelling reforms, but most regions maintained their own systems, which resulted in five varieties of "printer's language" being used in publications. While administration in prior eras had been handled largely in Latin and produced orders of magnitude less written material, the inventing of movable type printing and the widespread availability of cheap paper enabled a "bureaucratic revolution". However, the question of standardization soon arose and so each state bureaucracy (then known as a chancery) set "house standards" for orthography which were based at least in part on the spoken language of locally recruited staff. Now at least those in the wider area of a chancery with a high prestige standard had a written koine language that would be understood by all literate people within the area. The spoken language, however, underwent virtually no standardization within that era.

The largest influence in the 16th century was Martin Luther. Besides theological disagreements with the Vatican, his main contention was that every Christian should have access to theological texts in the vernacular. For this to succeed, two conditions had to be met: rapid distribution of the new translation at affordable prices (achievable thanks to printing) and a written vernacular that would be understood by as many people as possible. He did not create a new dialect for this task; most of his work was written in the language of Upper Saxony's chancellery based in Meißen, which was very close to his native dialect. Due to the prestige of that language, his work was more widely accepted. He was also able to influence the lexicon, both in choice of vocabulary and semantic selections. Since so many people read his work, orthography began to stabilize and with a canonical Standard German corpus of sorts being developed, although this was largely limited to the Protestant north. Despite the religious differences between the north and south of Germany, it was the existence of Eastern Central German that prevented the initial spread of Luther's linguistic forms. This divide was overcome in the Protestant parts of Central Germany as the prestige of Luther's dialect assured the acceptance of features from Eastern Central German. The differences were further reduced, as the need for coherent written communication became paramount and Eastern Central German, now highly identified with Luther, became the linguistic medium of the north. Low German, once the first language of the region and a subject of instruction, was displaced and restricted to use in comedic theater, and even there, it was used only by important figures. The first editions of Luther's bible translation still contained glosses for terms that might not be regionally understood — the effect of his work was so immense that those glosses were left out of later editions within Luther's lifetime as they were no longer deemed necessary. While Luther had started out from a high prestige variety developed for the bureaucratic needs of statecraft, he himself claimed to have "looked the common people on the mouth" in deciding which terms or turns of phrase to use — even if that meant significant divergence from the Greek and Hebrew original. To this day, the by now almost five centuries old Luther Bible is preferred by some Lutherans in Germany over more modern translations and it is generally seen as one of the earliest texts in the Early New High German stage of the now increasingly standardizing German written language.

This shift allowed "language societies" to modify the language further in the 17th century by translating Latinate compounds using German morphemes, which could be understood by any German-speaking child. Grammarians developed a body of usage within the canonical corpus, which was evaluated to monitor the use of the language. It was then that the ge-prefix for non-auxiliary past participles was regularized. Linguistic purism was also an issue, with French terms in particular being the target of deliberate attempts to replace them – many of them successful but others not. The most notable group of linguistic purists in Germany during that era was the fruchtbringende Gesellschaft.

The middle of the 18th century produced a slew of northern writers, who would ultimately shape the interaction between Catholic Germany, which had resisted Luther's linguistic influence, and the rest of the German-speaking world, directing the language's development path. The south did not have any comparable literary innovators to counterbalance the sudden emergence of standardized language in the north, so for two generations, the south's most influential literary minds spoke Lutheran-influenced dialects. In 1871, after centuries of highly-variable spelling and punctuation, a conference was held to create a uniform framework for German spelling, steered by the publication of a Bavarian dictionary in 1879 and a Prussian dictionary in 1880.

Similar to the abortive attempts to create a singular German language standard in the High Middle Ages, it would again be poets enjoying court patronage that gave the impetus for a standardized pronunciation of the written form. For the luminaries of Weimar Classicism, it would just not do, that a play written the same way all throughout German lands would sound different in Goethe's native Frankfurt to Schiller's native Württemberg to their adoptive Weimar. So the deutsche Bühnenaussprache was developed — initially intended for theater only, it would become the standard for radio, television and whenever someone from out of town tried to get understood by the locals. Ultimately the school system would encourage the spoken standard just as much as the written standard and by the 21st century, dialects, that had been first attested in writing a millennium before a written – let alone spoken – German standard language would emerge, are fighting a losing rearguard action against the increasing dominance of Standard German.

Jacob Grimm and Rudolf von Raumer created controversy in the 19th century, as they proposed conflicting criteria for defining spelling. Grimm argued that history and etymology should determine spelling, but van Raumer claimed that spelling should be based on pronunciation. Grimm's historical case found its way into orthography, with two different spellings of final /p, t, t-x/, depending on the surrounding environments. Any sort of standard pronunciation, therefore, was heavily reliant on standard writing.

=== In Denmark and Sweden ===
Kjeld Kristensen and Mats Thelander discuss two socio-dialectal investigations, one Danish and one Swedish. The paper suggests that the development of urban society and an increasing degree of publicness were mentioned as important non-linguistic causes of the accelerating dialect levelling. For example, heavy migration from the countryside to towns and cities, increased traffic and trade, longer schooling within a more centralized system of education and the spread of mass media and other kinds of technological development may all be factors that explain why the process has been more rapid during the 20th century than it was in the 19th or why levelling hits dialects of certain regions more than dialects elsewhere. The levelling of dialects of Danish towards the metropolitan standard of Copenhagen has been dubbed Copenhagenization by Tore Kristiansen.

=== In African American Vernacular English (AAVE) ===
In this case study, Anderson (2002) discusses dialect levelling of African American Vernacular English (AAVE) spoken in Detroit. In her research, she analyzes a very particular linguistic variable, the monophthongization of /aɪ/ before voiceless obstruents. While monophthongization of the diphthong /aɪ > aː/ is common in AAVE, it generally occurs in the environment of voiced, not voiceless, obstruents. For example, a southern speaker of AAVE would pronounce the word tide (voiced obstruent) as [taːd] and pronounce the word tight (voiceless obstruent) as [taɪt], but some southern white speakers would pronounce it as [taːt].

The monophthongization of /aɪ/ before voiceless obstruents is a salient characteristic of southern white dialects such as Appalachian and Texas varieties of English, and in the southern states, it indexes group membership with southern white people. To the north, however, in Detroit, the linguistic feature does not mark group membership with white people.

Anderson presents evidence that this linguistic marker has been adopted among speakers of AAVE in Detroit, in part because of contact with white Appalachian immigrants. In other words, the diphthongization of /aɪ/ before voiced obstruents, which is a common feature of AAVE, has been levelled with that of southern white dialects and is now then being pronounced as a monophthong.

In her article, Anderson reports that black and white segregation in Detroit is higher than in any other American city. She describes the demographics stating that the overwhelming majority of white people have moved to the suburbs and most local black people live in the inner city of Detroit (pp. 87–8). White Appalachians who have migrated to Detroit have found refuge in the inner city and have maintained close ties with black people. That is partly because of their cultural orientation to the South but also because both groups have been marginalised and, hence, subject to discrimination.

The contact among them has led to the levelling of AAVE with a southern white variety in which speakers of AAVE have adopted the monophthongization of /aɪ/ before voiceless obstruents. In the South, the linguistic marker indexes group membership between black people and white people, but in the North, the linguistic marker no longer works since white Detroiters do not use this feature in their speech. Anderson concludes that "the overall effect is that Detroit AAVE aligns with a Southern vowel system for the /ai/ vowel variable, including that of the Detroit Southern White community, while indexing an opposition with Northern Whites" (p. 95).

=== Mandarin tonal levelling in Taiwan ===
A study of Mandarin leveling in Taiwan investigated the tonal leveling of Mandarin between Mandarin-Waishengren (外省人) and Hoklo-Benshengren (本省人) in Taiwan. The results indicated that the tonal leveling of Mandarin between these two ethnic groups started one generation earlier than the general patterns suggested by Trudgill. This leveling has nearly reached its completion in the following generation, taking approximately 30 years.

Four factors were proposed to interpret the rapidity of this dialectal leveling:

1. The intensiveness of immigration to Taiwan
2. The exclusive Mandarin-only language policy
3. The pre-established social order and infrastructure during the Japanese colonial period
4. The frequent contacts between Waishengren and Benshengren.

== Related terms ==
=== Language convergence ===
Language convergence refers to what can happen linguistically when speakers adapt "to the speech of others to reduce differences". As such, it is a type of accommodation (modification), namely the opposite of divergence, which is the exploitation and making quantitatively more salient of differences. One can imagine this to be a long-term effect of interspeaker accommodation.

Unlike convergence, dialect levelling in the sense used in this study (a) is not only a performance phenomenon, but (b) also refers to what ultimately happens at the level of the 'langue', and (c) though in the long-term meaning it comes down to dissimilar varieties growing more similar, it does not necessarily come about by mutually or one-sidedly taking over characteristics of the other variety.

Like interference, dialect levelling is a contact phenomenon. However, it cannot be considered to be a type of interference according to Weinreich (1953), since (a) it is not a concomitant of bilingualism, and (b) it is not merely a performance phenomenon. Dialect leveling need not produce a new usage, but it may very well result in qualitative changes.

=== Geographical diffusion ===
Geographical diffusion is the process by which linguistic features spread out from a populous and economically and culturally dominant centre. The spread is generally wave-like, but modified by the likelihood that nearby towns and cities will adopt the feature before the more rural parts in between. At the individual level in such a diffusion model, speakers are in face-to-face contact with others who have already adopted the new feature, and (for various reasons) they are motivated to adopt it themselves. The reduction or attrition of marked variants in this case brings about levelling.

=== Mutual accommodation ===
Kerswill mentions that standardisation does not necessarily follow from dialect levelling; it is perfectly possible for dialects to converge without getting closer to the standard, which does happen in some situations.

The mechanism for standardisation lies in the kinds of social networks people have. People with more broadly based (more varied) networks will meet people with a higher social status. They will accommodate to them in a phenomenon known as upward convergence. The opposite, downward convergence, where a higher-status person accommodates to a lower status person, is much rarer. This accommodation is thought to happen mainly among adults in Western societies, not children or adolescents, because in those societies children and adolescents have much more self-centred, narrower peer groups. In societies where standardisation is generally something that adults do, children and adolescents perform other kinds of levelling.

Accommodation between individual speakers of different dialects takes place with respect to features that are salient, displaying phonetic or surface phonemic contrasts between the dialects. This process is mostly limited to salient features, geographical (distance), and demographic (population size) factors. Accommodation is not the same thing as levelling, but it can be its short-term preamble.

=== Koinéization ===
Koinéization, unlike dialect levelling, "involves the mixing of features of different dialects, and leads to a new, compromised dialect". It results from "integration or unification of the speakers of the varieties in contact". Clearly, dialect levelling is not strictly synonymous with koinéisation. First, dialect levelling does not merely take place in the space between dialects; it may also occur between a dialect and a standard language. Second, its end product cannot be equated with that of koinéisation, a koiné being the structurally stabilized and sociologically more or less standard product of heavy intermixture.

According to Milroy (2002), the difference between dialect levelling and koinéization is that dialect levelling involves the eradication of linguistic variants due to language contact while koinéization involves the creation of a new linguistic variety based on language contact.

== See also ==
- Accent reduction
- Language death
- Language shift
- Lingua franca
- Linguistic discrimination
- Linguistic prescription
- Linguistic purism
- Prestige language
- Cultural cringe
- Decreolization
- Language attrition
- Linguistic imperialism

== Bibliography ==
- Anderson, Bridget. 2002. Dialect leveling and /ai/ monophthongization among African American Detroiters. Journal of Sociolinguistics 6(1). 86–98.
- Bloomfield, L. 1933. Language. New York: H. Holt and Company.
- Britain, David. 1997. Dialect Contact and Phonological Reallocation: "Canadian Raising" in the English Fens. Language in Society 26(1). 15–46.
- Chambers, J. K., & Trudgill, P. 1980. Dialectology. Cambridge, England: Cambridge University Press.
- Cheshire, Jenny; Ann Gillett; Paul Kerswill and Ann Williams. 1999. The role of adolescents in dialect levelling: Final report submitted to the Economic and Social Research Council.
- Fitzmaurice, Susan M. 2000. The Great Leveler: The Role of the Spoken Media in Stylistic Shift From the Colloquial to the Conventional. American Speech 75(1). 54–68.
- Gibson, Maik. Dialect Levelling in Tunisian Arabic: Towards a New Spoken Standard. Language Contact and Language Conflict in Arabic, Aleya Rouchdy. Routledge, 2003.
- Hinskens, Frans. 1998. Dialect Levelling: A Two-dimensional Process. Folia Linguistica 32 (1-2). 35–52.
- Hinskens, Frans. (ed.) 1996. Dialect levelling in Limburg: Structural and sociolinguistic aspects. Linguistische Arbeiten.
- Hsu, Hui-ju and John Kwock-ping Tse. The Tonal Leveling of Taiwan Mandarin: A Study in Taipei. Concentric: Studies in Linguistics 35, no. 2 (2009): 225–244.
- Kerswill, Paul. 2001. Mobility, meritocracy and dialect levelling: the fading (and phasing) out of Received Pronunciation. "British studies in the new millennium: the challenge of the grassroots". University of Tartu, Tartu.
- Kristensen, Kjeld and Mats Thelander. 1984. On dialect levelling in Denmark and Sweden. Folia Linguistica 28(1/2). 223–246.
- Lefebvre, C. 1998. Creole genesis and the acquisition of grammar: The case of Haitian creole. Cambridge, UK: Cambridge University Press.
- Lefebvre, Claire. 2004. The relexification account of creole genesis: The case of Haitian Creole. Issues in the Study of Pidgin and Creole Languages, Lefebvre, Claire (ed.) Amsterdam/Philadelphia, John Benjamins. pp. 59-180
- Miller, Michael I. 1987. Three Changing Verbs: Bite, Ride and Shrink. Journal of English Linguistics 20(1). 3-12.
- Schøning, Signe Wedel and Inge Lise Pedersen. 2009. Vinderup in Real Time: A Showcase of Dialect Levelling. ed. by Dufresne, Monique, Fernande Dupuis and Etleva Vocaj. 233–244.
- Siegel, J. 1985. Koines and koineization. Language in Society 14/3, 357–78.
- Siegel, Jeff. 1997. Mixing, Levelling and pidgin/creole development. In A. Spears and D. Winford (eds.), The structure and status of pidgins and creoles. Amsterdam: John Benjamins, 111–49.
- Trudgill, Peter, Elizabeth Gordon, Gillian Lewis and Margaret MacLagan. 2000. Determinism in new-dialect formation and the genesis of New Zealand English. Journal of Linguistics 36 (2). 299–318. Cambridge: Cambridge University Press.
- Twaddell, William. F. 1959. Standard German: Urbanization and Standard Language: A Symposium Presented at the 1958 Meetings of the American Anthropological Association. Anthropological Linguistics 1(3). 1–7.
- Wrong, Margaret. 1942. Ibo Dialects and the Development of a Common Language. Journal of the Royal African Society 41(163). 139–141.
