= Nicolae Saramandu =

Romanian linguist and philologist

- Born: 1 July 1941; Bucharest, Romania
- Occupations: Linguist, philologist

Academic background
- Education: Gheorghe Șincai National College; University of Bucharest

Nicolae Saramandu (also Niculae; born 1 July 1941) is a Romanian linguist and philologist of Aromanian ethnicity. He has been professor in several universities and vice president and later president of the Atlas Linguarum Europae ("Atlas of the Languages of Europe"), also being a corresponding member of the Romanian Academy. Saramandu has undertaken extensive research on the Aromanians, and has involved himself in several activities related to their cultural development.

== Biography ==
Nicolae Saramandu was born on 1 July 1941 in Bucharest, Romania. He was born in an Aromanian family that had fled from Greece to Romania. Saramandu's family was from Livadia (Aromanian: Giumala de Jos or Livãdz), and part of it had studied in Romanian schools in the Balkans. In a 2018 interview, he stated that there were documents evidencing the execution of five people with the surname Saramandu in Greece "because they resisted the authorities which wanted to change their ethnicity".

Saramandu studied from 1955 to 1959 at the Gheorghe Șincai National College in Bucharest and from 1959 to 1964 at the Faculty of Romanian Language and Literature of the University of Bucharest. In 1964, he became researcher at the Center of Phonetic and Dialectal Research of the Romanian Academy. He obtained a doctorate on philology in 1970. From 1972 to 1974, Saramandu worked as an intern of the Alexander von Humboldt Foundation at the University of Tübingen in West Germany. From 1983 to 1985, he was a professor of Romanian language and literature at the University of Freiburg in West Germany, being from 1993 to 1995 invited professor of Romance studies at the same university and invited professor in 2004, 2005, 2010 and 2014 at the universities of Bamberg and Marburg in Germany. In 1991, he became doctoral advisor at the University of Bucharest, being appointed in 1999 as university professor and in 2014 as emeritus professor. He was vice president of the Atlas Linguarum Europae ("Atlas of the Languages of Europe") from 2001 to 2003 and then president in 2004. Furthermore, since 2018, he is a corresponding member of the Romanian Academy.

Saramandu has done extensive research in the field of the Aromanians. Among his scholarly activities are included his participation in Atlasului lingvistic al dialectului aromân ("Linguistic Atlas of the Aromanian Dialect") and the publication under his lead of Dicționar meglenoromân ("Megleno-Romanian Dictionary") and Dicționarul toponimic al României. Muntenia (DTRM) ("Toponymic Dictionary of Romania. Muntenia (TDRM)"). Other activities of Saramandu relevant to the Aromanians include his collaboration with Vasile Barba in Freiburg, the formation of journalists for the Aromanian-language edition of Radio Romania International which started broadcasting in March 1991, the publication in Skopje in 1997 of a manual of Aromanian to be used in courses of the language in North Macedonia, and his participation in the efforts for the standardization of the Aromanian language that took place in Bitola in 1997. Saramandu holds the position that the Aromanians are an ethnic subgroup of the Romanians that speak a dialect of Romanian rather than an independent language of their own.
