= List of prestige dialects =

A prestige dialect is the dialect that is considered most prestigious by the members of that speech community. In nearly all cases, the prestige dialect is also the dialect spoken by the most prestigious members of that community, often the people who have political, economic, or social power.

== A ==
- Arabic – In the Arab League countries, Modern Standard Arabic is considered the H-language, or high-prestige language. In contrast to most prestige dialects, it is not used in day-to-day conversation, but is rather reserved for literature and elevated or formal discourse. It is not commonly used in everyday conversation.
- Assyrian Neo-Aramaic – Among modern Assyrian people, Iraq Koine is widely considered to be a prestige form of speech, where it is the standard variety in the Assyrian social and political media, and the Assyrian church. Iraqi Koine is a "watered down", merger dialect of the rather coarse Assyrian tribal varieties of the mountains and the classically prestigious Urmian dialect (spoken by Iranian Assyrians), but would lack the harshness of the rural dialects and the superfluous Persian influence of the Urmian dialect. In the 19th and early 20th century, or at least up to the 1980s, the Urmian dialect was a standard literary dialect of Assyrian, chosen by an American Presbyterian missioner Justin Perkins in 1836. In the late 20th century, Assyrians gradually started to mix with each other and spoke Iraqi Koine, as Iraq had an influx of Assyrians from different villages settling there.

== B ==
- Central Bikol, spoken in the city of Naga and in its surrounding municipalities, in the Philippines. Bikol Naga is the prestige dialect as it is heard in Catholic mass, songs and in television. It is also the one read in local newspapers.

== C ==
- Chinese:
  - Mandarin – Specifically the Standard Mandarin variant based on the Beijing dialect as spoken by the commoners of the early to mid 20th century. There are differences in the way this standard is defined between the People's Republic of China and Taiwan. In Taiwan, for instance, the Standard Mandarin was not based on the commoner's usage of the Beijing dialect but the variety of this dialect as used by the educated class at the time.
  - Cantonese – Considered the prestige variety of Yue Chinese variants, based on the dialect of Guangzhou City and the surrounding areas, including Liangguang (Guangdong and Guangxi), Hong Kong and Macau.
  - Shanghainese – Considered the prestige variety of Wu Chinese variants, based on the dialect of Shanghai City and the surrounding districts, having replaced Suzhounese in this role in the 19th century.
  - Southern Min (Hokkien-Taiwanese) – also known as the Quan-Zhang variety of Southern Min, is the mainstream form of Southern Min. The Modern Standard Southern Min dialect is based on Taiwanese Hokkien which includes the Taiwanese prestige accent.

== D ==
- Dutch – Standard Dutch is considered most prestigious when no clear traces of a speaker's dialect can be recognised.

== E ==
- English – In the United Kingdom, the prestige dialect is often considered to be Received Pronunciation whereas Cultivated Australian English and Cultivated South African English have traditionally been the prestige dialect in those countries. The United States is said to have no single prestige dialect. However, American dictionaries, broadcast journalists, and stage, cinema, and television actors favor General American as the standard form of American speech. Before 1950, the Northeastern elite accent enjoyed a high level of prestige, particularly in the Northeastern U.S. A related accent known as the Transatlantic dialect was popular within the American entertainment industry. In Canada, Canadian dainty was considered to be the prestige dialect, before sharply falling out of favor after World War II. In modern India, Indian English, a slightly Indianized version of English having some influence of Indian local languages is generally used in practice.

== F ==
- Filipino - is the standardised version of the Manila Tagalog dialect that is used as the national lingua franca in the Philippines. It is used as the language of media in the Philippines instead of or aside from English.
- French
  - France – Standard French is based on the dialect of Paris.
  - United States – Colonial French (also Plantation Society French) is considered the prestige dialect of Louisiana French, though it is deemed virtually extinct due to gradual assimilation with standard Cajun French.

== G ==
- German
  - Germany – Standard German, Standard High German or often erroneously called High German (in German: Hochdeutsch) is considered the prestige dialect of Germany, especially in northern and central regions of Germany. Dialects are still very common in southern regions across all demographics, though some assimilation does happen in formal settings (Bavaria, Baden-Württemberg, Palatinate, Saxony). Towards the North, however, proper dialects have diminished since World War II and tend to be associated nowadays with rural regions, urban working class and elderly people. Regiolects have replaced dialects in informal speech (e.g. Rhinelands), but formal speech is very close to Standard German.
  - Switzerland – Swiss Standard German can be considered the lingua franca of Switzerland for communication on national levels and with people from other German-speaking countries, whereas the many dialects subsumed under the umbrella term Swiss German are used in everyday life across all demographics including formal settings.

== H ==
- Hindi – the Dehlavi dialect (Hindustani) is the prestige dialect, and the basis of both Modern Standard Hindi and Modern Standard Urdu.

== M ==
- Marathi – The dialect of Pune is considered to be the standard and prestige dialect.

== P ==
- Punjabi – The Majhi dialect spoken around Amritsar is the standardized and most prestigious Punjabi dialect in India.

== T ==
- Tamil – Tamil exhibits different standard forms: a classical literary style modelled on the ancient language (sankattamiḻ), a modern literary and formal style (centamiḻ), and a modern colloquial form (koṭuntamiḻ). These styles shade into each other, forming a stylistic continuum.
- Tagalog - The Manila dialect is the prestige dialect among many native speakers due to the city's economic importance and the dialect's implication of wealth and high social status. This dialect is the basis of Filipino, the standardised official and national language of the Philippines. The Bulacan dialect is sometimes held as a higher standard for literary and artistic purposes.
- Telugu – The standard form is based on the dialect and accent as spoken in Krishna District. In Hyderabad, the Telugu is heavily influenced by Urdu
- Thai – Standard Thai is based on the dialect of the educated classes of Bangkok, in Central Thailand. In addition to Central Thai, Thailand is home to other related Tai languages. Although linguists usually classify these idioms as related, but distinct languages, native speakers often identify them as regional variants or dialects of the "same" Thai language, or as "different kinds of Thai".
- Turkish: Modern standard Turkish is based on the dialect of Istanbul. This Istanbulite Turkish (İstanbul Türkçesi) constitutes the model of written and spoken Turkish, as recommended by Ziya Gökalp, Ömer Seyfettin and others.

== U ==
- Urdu – Modern Standard Urdu is a prestige dialect of the Hindustani language, spoken in and around the northern Indian city of Lucknow. Since a large part of the Urdu-speaking population from this area migrated to the area around Karachi during the 1947 Partition of India, this variety has also become the prestige accent in Pakistan.

== See also ==
- Prestige (sociolinguistics)
- Dialect
