= Language convergence =

Type of linguistic change

Language convergence is a type of linguistic change in which languages come to resemble one another structurally as a result of prolonged language contact and mutual interference, regardless of whether those languages belong to the same language family, i.e. stem from a common genealogical proto-language. In contrast to other contact-induced language changes like creolization or the formation of mixed languages, convergence refers to a mutual process that results in changes in all the languages involved. The term refers to changes in systematic linguistic patterns of the languages in contact (phonology, prosody, syntax, morphology) rather than alterations of individual lexical items.

== Contexts ==
Language convergence occurs in geographic areas with two or more languages in contact, resulting in groups of languages with similar linguistic features that were not inherited from each language's proto-language. These geographic and linguistic groups are called linguistic areas, or Sprachbund areas. Linguistic features shared by the languages in a language area as a result of language convergence are called areal features. In situations with many languages in contact and a variety of areal features, linguists may use the term language convergence to indicate the impossibility of locating a singular source for each areal feature. However, as the classification of linguistic areas and language convergence depends on shared areal features, linguists must distinguish between areal features resulting from convergence and internally motivated changes resulting in chance similarities between languages.

Language convergence can also occur for a particular person's grammar. It sometimes occurs in children who are acquiring a second language. Because the grammar of the child's native language is still developing, the grammar patterns of the first and second language can influence each other. Singaporean students learning both English and Mandarin showed use of common Mandarin grammatical structures when speaking English.

== Mechanisms ==
Language convergence occurs primarily through diffusion, the spread of a feature from one language to another. The causes of language convergence are highly dependent on the specifics of the contact between the languages involved. Often, convergence is motivated by bilingual code-switching or code-alternation. Seeking full expressive capacity in both languages, bilingual speakers identify preexisting parallels between languages and use these structures to express similar meanings, eventually leading to convergence or increasing the frequency of the similar patterns. Sociolinguistic factors may also influence the effects of language convergence, as ethnic boundaries can function as barriers to language convergence. Ethnic boundaries may help to explain areas in which linguists’ predictions about language convergence do not align with reality, such as areas with high inter-ethnic contact but low levels of convergence.

== Results ==
Language convergence often results in the increased frequency of preexisting patterns in a language; if one feature is present in two languages in contact, convergence results in increased use and cross-linguistic similarity of the parallel feature. As contact situations leading to language convergence lack defined substrate and superstrate languages, the outcomes of convergence often resemble structures found in all the languages involved without perfectly replicating any one pattern. Language convergence is most apparent in phonetics, with the phonological systems of the languages in contact gradually coming to resemble one another. In some cases, the results of phonological convergence may be limited to a few phonemes, while in other linguistic areas phonological convergence can result in widespread changes that affect the entire phonological system, such as the development of phonemic tone distinctions. In contrast to the limited effects of lexical borrowing, phonetic, syntactic, or morphological convergence can have greater consequences, as converging patterns can influence an entire system rather than only a handful of lexical items.

== Difficulties ==
When studying convergence, linguists take care to distinguish between features inherited from a language's proto-language, internally motivated changes, and diffusion from an outside source; in order to argue for language convergence, linguists try to argue for both an outside source and the mechanism that precipitated the change. The more drastic effects of language convergence, such as significant syntactic convergence and mixed languages, lead some linguists to question the validity of traditional historical linguistic methods. Because of these far-reaching effects, other linguists are hesitant to accept convergence explanations for similar features and argue that often another explanation better represents changes that might otherwise attributed to language convergence.

== Examples ==
- Balkans Sprachbund: Contact between AD 800 and AD 1700 led to changes in phonology, morphology, syntax, and lexicon of Albanian, Bulgarian, Romanian, and Greek. The Balkans Sprachbund is an extreme case of language convergence.
- Arnhem Land, Australia: Morphosyntactic convergence and massive lexical diffusion in the Yuulgnu languages Ritharngnu, Dhayʔyi, and others and the "Prefixing" languages Ngandi, Nunggubuyu, and others, though long periods of separation helped to preserve language boundaries.
- Spanish and Quechua: Phonological convergence of the palatal /ʎ/ in Spanish and Quechua. Northern variants of Ecuadorian Spanish and Quechua include the innovative [ʒ] while southern variants of both languages maintain the [ʎ] pronunciation.
- Chinese, Thai, and Vietnamese: Form a linguistic area based on the areal feature of phonemic tone distinctions.
- Indo-Aryan and Dravidian languages: Include the shared areal feature of retroflex consonants.
- Chipewyan, Cree, French, and English: Phonological convergence of c and s-series consonants.
- Standard Average European - the convergence of several European languages, both Indo-European and unrelated ones

== See also ==
- Dialect levelling
- Linguistic divergence
- Maltese language
- Mixed language
- Sprachbund
