= Singaporean Chinese =

Singaporean Chinese may refer to:

- Chinese Singaporeans, the citizens or residents of Singapore who are of Chinese ancestry
- Singaporean Hokkien, historically the largest vernacular spoken by Chinese Singaporeans
- Singaporean Mandarin, the dialect of Mandarin Chinese spoken in Singapore
- Chinese nationals in Singapore, people with Chinese nationality residing in Singapore
