= Hong Kong–Singapore relations =

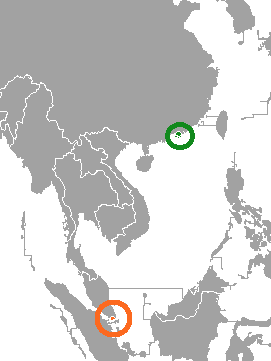
- Hong Kong: Singapore

Both Hong Kong (a Special Administrative Region of the People's Republic of China) and the Republic of Singapore are former British colonies which have maintained trade relations since the 19th century, and have both become important financial centres, maintaining diplomatic missions and trade offices to further their bilateral relations.

In addition to being represented by the Chinese Embassy, the Government of the Hong Kong SAR also operates a Hong Kong Economic and Trade Office in Singapore. Similarly, in addition to its Embassy in Beijing, Singapore has a Consulate-General in Hong Kong. When Hong Kong was under British rule, it was known as the Singapore Commission.

== History ==
=== Pre-contemporary era ===
Singapore and Hong Kong started trading in the 19th century. According to newspapers in Hong Kong, the idea of a rivalry between Hong Kong and Singapore had been around since the 1900s. In 1923, the Japanese Association of Singapore published a book named The Introduction of Singapore, which showed that there were trade relations between Hong Kong and Singapore and there were Japanese merchant ships operating routes between Hong Kong and Singapore.

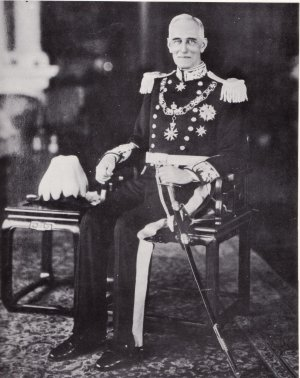
Cecil Clementi was the Governor of Hong Kong between 1925 and 1930 and the Governor of the Straits Settlements between 1930 and 1934

When Hong Kong and Singapore were both under British rule, some officials would serve as Governor of Hong Kong before becoming Governor of the Straits Settlements (or later, of Singapore) or vice versa.

For example, Cecil Clementi was Governor of Hong Kong between 1925 and 1930 and the Governor of the Straits Settlements between 1930 and 1934. Robert Black was the Governor of Singapore between 1955 and 1957, and the Governor of Hong Kong between 1958 and 1964.

In addition, they would introduce practices in one colony which they had introduced in the other. For example, when Clementi was Governor of the Straits Settlements, Chinese people were appointed to the Executive Council of the Straits Settlements, as was the case with the Executive Council of Hong Kong.

Similarly, when Black was Governor of Hong Kong, he implemented the localisation of the civil service in Hong Kong, as had occurred in Singapore. He also appointed local people in Hong Kong to become high officials in the Government of Hong Kong.

=== Contemporary era ===
Lee Kuan Yew, who was the Prime Minister of Singapore from 1959 to 1990, visited British Hong Kong several times during his term of office and expressed opinions about the political development of Hong Kong. In 1984, the Sino-British Joint Declaration was signed between China and the United Kingdom stating that the former would take over Hong Kong on July 1, 1997, stimulating waves of mass migrations from Hong Kong to Singapore and other countries. Hence, the government of Singapore issued a quota of 25,000 family immigrant visas for people in Hong Kong.

In 1997, Tang Liang Hong, a politician of the Workers' Party (WP) in Singapore, fled to Australia after the 1997 general election after facing multiple defamation lawsuits by ministers of the governing People's Action Party (PAP). He published the book Memoir of Tang Liang Hong during his stay in Hong Kong with the assistance of the Chinese University of Hong Kong. In 2000, the Chinese University of Hong Kong conferred an honorary doctorate upon Lee Kuan Yew, to the dissatisfaction of some in the Student Union of the university. The union unsuccessfully organised a petition to urge the university rescind the decision. Tang died in Hong Kong in 2025, having never returned to Singapore.

On September 17, 2014, Lee Hsien Loong, the Prime Minister of Singapore, visited Hong Kong and met with Leung Chun Ying, the Chief Executive of Hong Kong. Leung Chun Ying and Lee Hsien Loong talked about cooperation and interaction between Hong Kong and Singapore including housing, land use planning and infrastructures. Leung Chun Ying also organized a banquet to regale Lee Hsien Loong. Following Lee Kuan Yew's death on March 23, 2015, Leung expressed condolences over the death of Lee by sending a message to his son, Lee Hsien Loong, the Prime Minister of Singapore.

On June 30, 2015, Amos Yee, a Singaporean blogger, was sentenced to four weeks in jail due to uploading a video crticising Lee Kuan Yew. Student unions from eight universities in Hong Kong protested near the Consulate General of Singapore in Hong Kong to urge the government of Singapore to release Amos Yee. Yee eventually became a convicted sex offender in the United States, serving a few years in prison as a result.

== Trade relations ==
In 2012, the value of goods exported from Hong Kong to Singapore was worth 2.53 billion US dollars, while the value of goods exported from Singapore to Hong Kong was worth 16.8 billion US dollars. Hong Kong mainly exported machines, precious metals and transportation facilities to Singapore, while Singapore mainly exported machines, refined petroleum and precious metals to Hong Kong.

The Singapore Chamber of Commerce was established in Hong Kong in September 1995.

== Cultural relations ==
In April 2004, Singapore and Hong Kong signed Memorandum of Understanding on Cultural Cooperation. In order to coordinate the signing of the memorandum, the Fringe Club organized the City Festival which was focused on Singapore in 2006.

Singapore International School, the only international school organized by the Ministry of Education of Singapore, operated in Kennedy Town, Hong Kong from September 1991 to 1995 when a campus opened up in Aberdeen.

== 2016 Terrex incident ==
Nine undeclared Terrex belonging to the Singapore Armed Forces, found on a Taiwanese-registered container ship en route from Kaohsiung, Taiwan to Singapore after a military training exercise, was seized by Hong Kong customs officials on November 23, 2016, during a routine check in Kwai Chung Cargo Terminal, Hong Kong. The vehicles were held for almost two months under the suspicion of trafficking of military equipment.

The Ministry of National Defense of Republic of China issued a statement after the incident stating that the Terrex carriers belonged to the Singapore Army, and were due to be shipped back to Singapore after Exercise Starlight, a joint military exercise between the Singapore Army and the Taiwanese Army. The Ministry of Defence of Singapore admitted to the incident and added that the Terrex carriers were unloaded and expressed hope that they could be shipped back to Singapore as soon as possible.

On November 28, 2016, the spokesperson for Ministry of Foreign Affairs of the People's Republic of China, Deng Shuang, said in a press conference that "The Government of China has made representations to the Government of Singapore, requesting that Singapore follow the relevant laws of Hong Kong and cooperate with the Government of Hong Kong to resolve this issue. The Government of China has always been staunchly opposed any country with diplomatic ties to China maintaining official relations with the Republic of China in any form, including military exchanges and cooperation. We request that Singapore Government observe the principle of the One-China policy." On November 29, the Minister for Foreign Affairs of Singapore, Vivian Balakrishnan stressed that “Our relations with China and our interactions with Hong Kong and Taiwan are based strictly on our one-China policy. We have consistently abided by this policy and understandings reached when we established diplomatic relations with China in 1990, and we will continue to do so."

In January 2017, the Hong Kong authorities said they had completed their investigations and would release the Terrex vehicles to Singapore. It was concluded that the Singapore Government could not be held responsible for the breach as it was the consignee of the military vehicles who broke the law. The captain of the container ship belonging to the shipping company American President Lines was charged with not having a required licence for the Terrex carriers. The vehicles arrived in Singapore on January 30.

== See also ==
- Foreign relations of Hong Kong
- Foreign relations of Singapore
