= Samuel Gan =

Singaporean biomedical scientist

Samuel Ken-En Gan (born 1981) is a Singaporean multi-disciplinary biomedical scientist, psychologist, writer, Christian apologist, and educator. He is currently the Academic Director and Associate Professor in University of Nottingham Ningbo China (UNNC) and an adjunct associate professor and Advisor Mentor for James Cook University Singapore as well as associate senior lecturer in a few teaching institutions in Singapore. Before his time at UNNC, he served a short stint as a research professor at Wenzhou–Kean University from August 2022 to July 2026.

Notably, during his time as Senior Principal Investigator of the Antibody and Product Development (APD) Lab within the Agency for Science, Technology and Research (A*STAR), a statutory board under the Ministry of Energy, Trade and Industry of Singapore, from September 2011 to April 2022, he founded a startup for scientific phone apps, consultancy, research and educational kits in 2017, which also housed the first and only specialized journal Scientific Phone Apps and Mobile Devices on mobile apps and IoT devices transferred from SpringerNature. Gan also set up a new open-access student journal "APD Trove" in 2017 and serves as founding Editor-in-Chief for both journals. Apart from the two journals he founded, he also served as associate editor for Frontiers in Immunology, Frontiers in Virology, and guest editor for the 'Methods and protocols' journal by MDPI and Frontiers in Psychology.

== Education ==
Gan graduated from Temasek Polytechnic with a Diploma in Biotechnology. He attained his BSc (Hons) in Molecular Cell Biology from University College London before embarking on his Masters in Structural Biology from Birkbeck College and Ph.D. in Allergy from King's College London simultaneously with his BSc (Hons) in Psychology from Open University, Graduate Certificate in Academic Practice and the Associate of King's College, both from King's College London.

Gan is also trained in translation & interpretation, theology, business admin, and commercial law & tech transfer. He is a member of the Higher Education Academy UK, the British Psychological Society, Biochemical Society UK, Allergy & Clinical Immunology Society Singapore, and the New York Academy of Sciences.

In 2026, he completed both his Masters of Divinity and Masters of Arts in Christian Studies in Third Mill Seminary.

== Research ==
Gan performs and publishes research articles in many disciplines. He currently has over 90 publications that includes scientific research articles and books spanning over antibody engineering, viral mutations, psychology (including music psychology), theology, apologetics, scientific phone apps, and science-fiction. He is most well-known publicly for being one of the pioneers of scientific phone apps, in particularly, DNAApp, which received significant worldwide coverage and started the work of scientific phone apps, including founding the journal with SpringerNature. Gan also has research in psychology, particularly in the context of Singapore. His most noted work in this discipline is the 'P2P' theory on how music can moderate anxiety and affect learning. Combining psychology and apps, his lab now has research in psychological game apps to validate and study psychological parameters via smartphone game apps.

In biomedical sciences, Gan's research publications are focused on holistic protein engineering, particularly in the rational drug design of antibody therapeutics. In the area of viruses, his work focusses on understanding protein-protein interactions in HIV drug targets, and how new interventions can be designed.

== Awards and recognition ==
In 2006, Gan was featured as one of the 100 most talented Singaporeans below the age of 25 and one of 200 selected international students globally for the 7th China Synergy Programme for Outstanding Youths 第七届海外杰青会.

Gan was listed as one of fifty skilled talented alumni from polytechnic/ITE in Singapore in the SG50 Book "A Nation of Skilled Talents", selected as one of the "world's most promising researchers" in the Interstellar Initiative by the New York Academy of Sciences and the Japan Agency for Medical Research and Development, as well as one of the 30 world class innovators in the book "Innovation Through Fusion" by Dr CJ Meadows.

In late 2020, Gan's team won Bronze in the inaugural Merck Lab Connectivity Challenge internationally for their work on scientific phone apps and prototype devices. In February 2022, Gan was named winner of the "Science and Sustainability" category in the UK Alumni Awards 2021-22 in Singapore.
