= Xian Jun Loh =

Singaporean polymer chemist

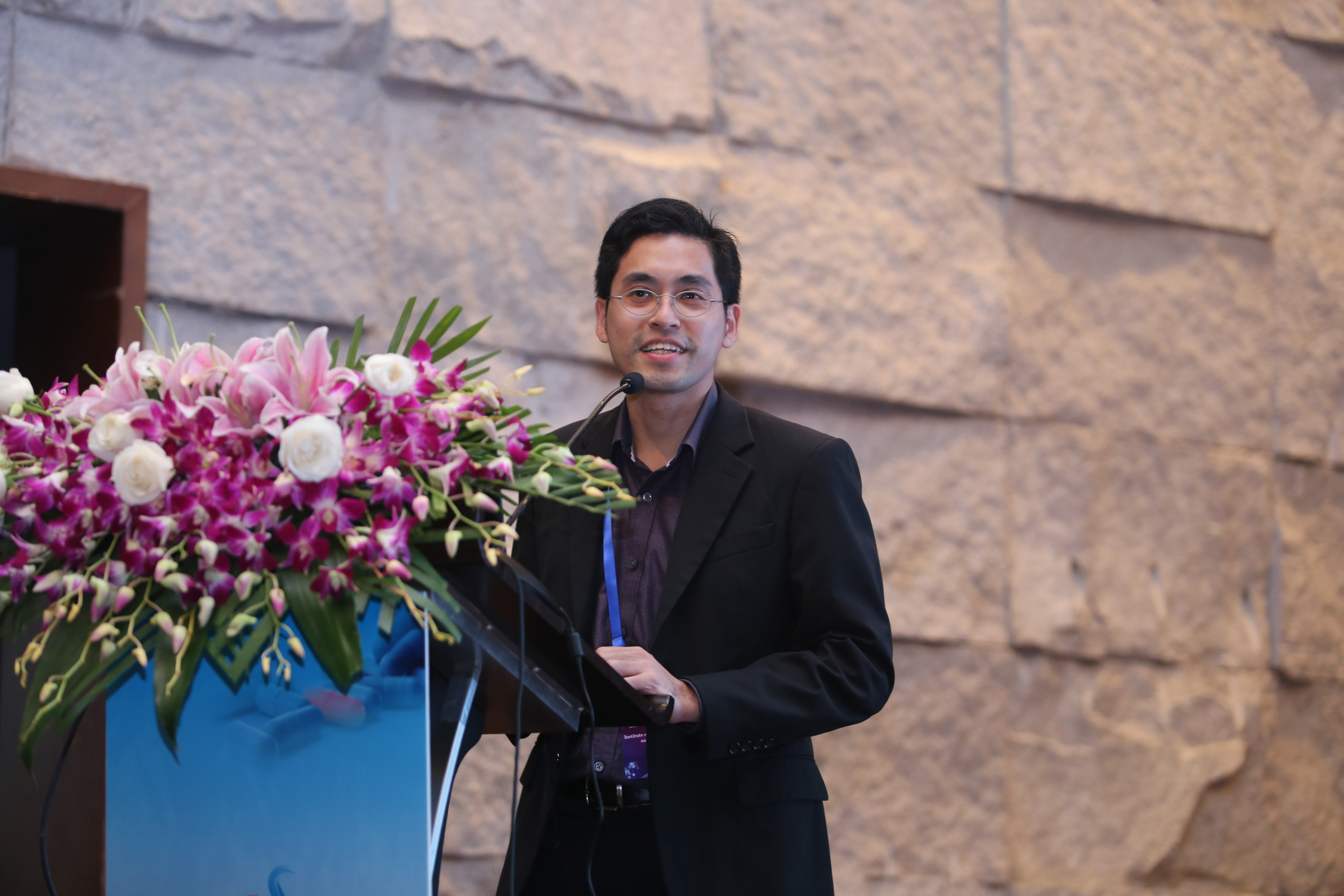
- Born: Xian Jun Loh; 1981 (age 44–45); Singapore

Xian Jun Loh (simplified Chinese: 罗贤俊; traditional Chinese: 羅賢俊; pinyin: Lúo Xiánjùn; born 1981) is a Singaporean polymer chemist who works in the inter-disciplinary field of biomaterials. He is the Executive Director of the Institute of Materials Research and Engineering of the Agency for Science, Technology and Research and a professor at the Nanyang Technological University. He is currently the President of the Singapore National Institute of Chemistry.

Professor Loh Xian Jun was elected a Fellow of Fitzwilliam College, University of Cambridge, working on smart biomaterials that identify and target cancer cells. He is also credited with the invention of a customisable, fabric-like power source for wearable electronics. He has also worked with a major Japanese company, LION Corporation, for the development of new anti-microbial compounds for detergents.

During the COVID pandemic, he co-invented a smart mask that allows for the remote monitoring of vital signs of patients.

== Education ==
Loh graduated with a bachelor's in applied sciences in 2006 and a PhD in 2009 from National University of Singapore. In 2011 he was elected a fellow of Fitzwilliam College, Cambridge.

== Books ==
- Polymeric and Self Assembled Hydrogels : From Fundamental Understanding to Applications; Editors: Xian Jun Loh, Oren A. Scherman; Publisher: Royal Society of Chemistry
- In-Situ Gelling Polymers: For Biomedical Applications; Editor: Xian Jun Loh; Publisher: Springer
- Polymers for Personal Care Products and Cosmetics; Editor: Xian Jun Loh; Publisher: Royal Society of Chemistry
- Functional Materials from Lignin; Editor: Xian Jun Loh; Publisher: World Scientific
- Biodegradable thermogels; Editor: Xian Jun Loh; Publisher: Royal Society of Chemistry

== Editorial Services and Scholarly Leadership ==
- World Scientific Annual Review of Functional Materials (ISO4 Abbreviation: World Sci. Ann. Rev. Funct. Mater.; WSARFM); Editor-in-Chief: Xian Jun Loh; Publisher: World Scientific Publishing Co Pte Ltd
