= Handong Sun =

Singaporean physicist

Handong Sun is a Singaporean physicist currently at Nanyang Technological University and an Elected Fellow of the American Physical Society.
