= Ying Fo Fui Kun =

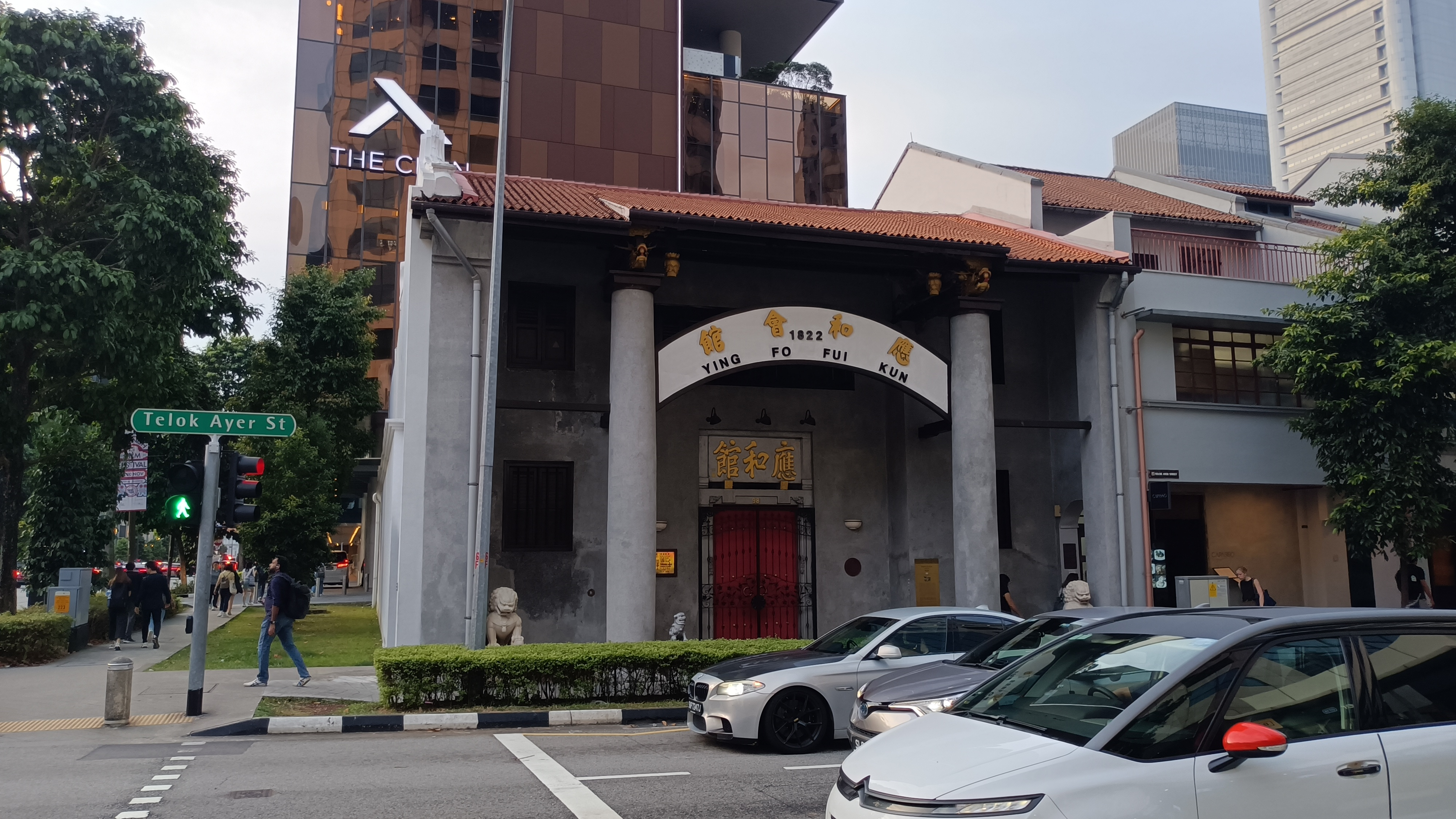
- Ying Fo Fui Kun in 2025

- Location within Singapore
- 1°16′56.9″N 103°50′54.4″E
- Location: 98 Telok Ayer Street

History
- Built: 1881-1882

Site notes
- Governing body: National Heritage Board

National monument of Singapore
- Designated: 18 December 1998; 27 years ago
- Reference no.: 40

Ying Fo Fui Kun (simplified Chinese: 应和会馆; traditional Chinese: 應和會館; pinyin: Yìnghè Huìguǎn) is a Hakka clan association in Singapore. Its clan house is located at Telok Ayer Street in the Outram Planning Area, within the Central Area.

The Ying Fo Fui Kun clan house building was constructed in 1881-1882. Ying Fo Fui Kun was the first Hakka association in Singapore and once housed the Ying Sin School (應新學校) from 1905 to 1971.

== History ==
Established in 1822-1823, Ying Fo Fui Kun is the oldest clan associations in Singapore. At a time when development in Singapore was in its infancy, Ying Fo Fui Kun's clan house was amongst the first buildings in Telok Ayer, where the island's earliest Chinese settlements were located.

Ying Fo Fui Kun began life as a temple, serving the needs of Hakka immigrants from Meizhou prefecture in Canton. Its founder, Liu Runde (劉潤德), envisaged Ying Fo Fui Kun as a public institution that would not only provide welfare services — the conventional role of a clan association — but also act as a kinship bridge between the Hakka community in Singapore and China. Ying Fo Fui Kun looked after the welfare of its members, finding accommodation and jobs for newly arrived Hakkas and making funeral arrangements for deceased clan members. In 1905, Ying Fo Fui Kun opened what was then considered a modern Chinese school.

In 1887, the Ying Fo Fui Kun bought over a piece of land from the British government to meet the burial demands of the increasing number of association members. The Ying Fo Kuan Memorial was built, and an ancestral hall was built next to it, which was called the Shuang Long Shan Wu Shu Ancestral Hall (Twin Dragon Hills).

== Architecture ==
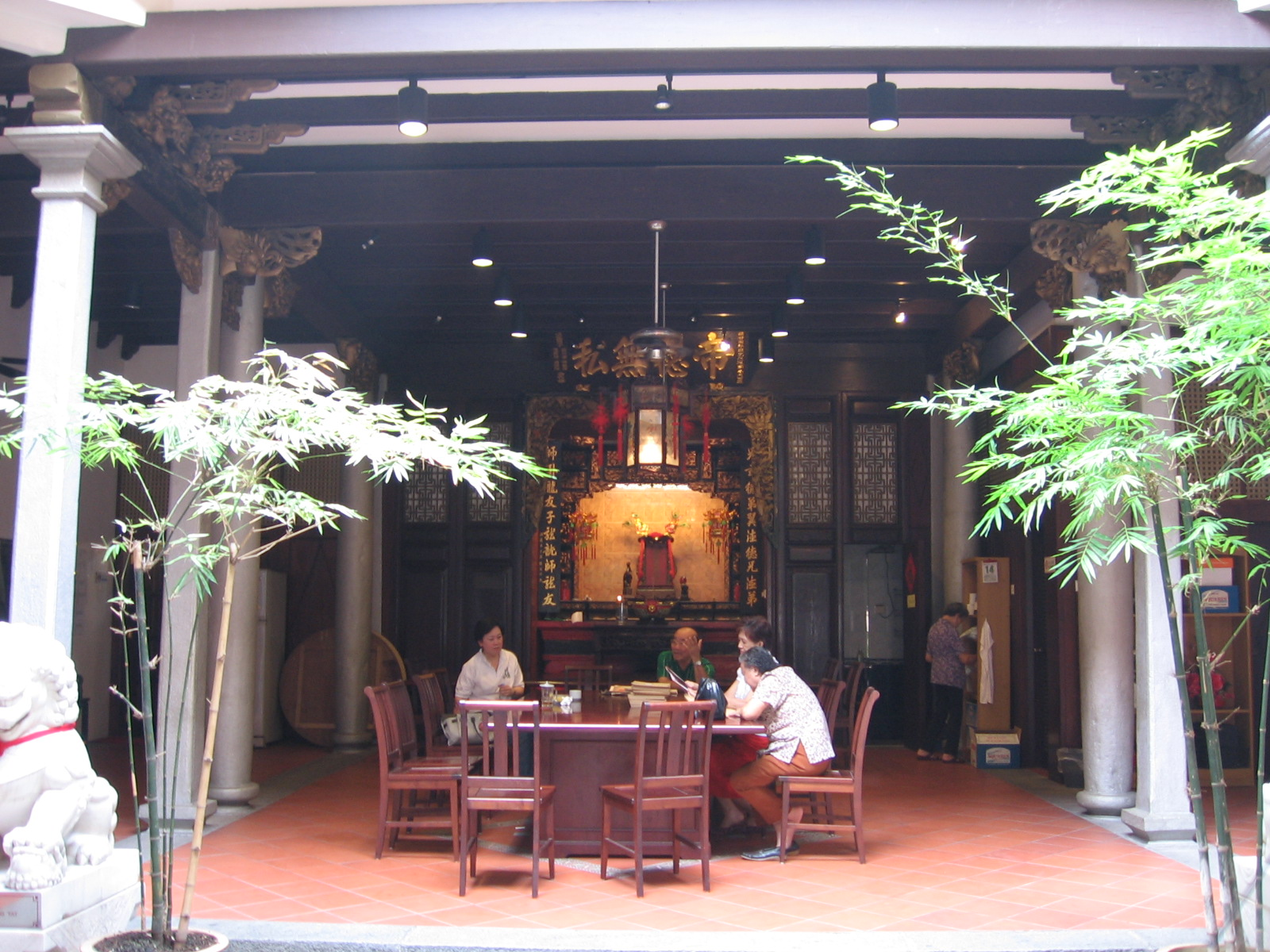
Ground floor of Ying Fo Fui Kun clan house

Ying Fo Fui Kun's clan house has since been rebuilt several times, but it has always remained at its original site in Telok Ayer. The clan house features inscribed stone tablets and carved boards from the nineteenth century. The clan's oldest surviving artefact is an 1846 inscribed board.

On the ground floor are meeting and administration rooms, while the upper level houses an altar dedicated to Guan Ti (关帝), the Martial deity honored by Qing imperial court. A popular Chinese heroic deity revered by many clan associations, Guan Ti embodies the qualities of courage and loyalty — two virtues close to the hearts of the early Chinese immigrants.

The clan building has been well preserved; a 1997 renovation restored the intricate beam carvings to their original splendour.

The Ying Fo Fui Kun clan house was gazetted as a national monument on 18 December 1998.
