= Hebrew school =

Jewish educational institution

A Hebrew school is a Jewish educational institution that focuses on Jewish history, learning the Hebrew language, and finally learning one's Torah portion in preparation for the coming-of-age ceremony in Judaism. Classes are usually taught in dedicated rooms at a synagogue under the instruction of a Hebrew teacher (who may or may not be fluent in Hebrew), often receiving support from a hazzan for learning the ancient chanting of a student's Torah portion and from a rabbi during the ceremony, because a Torah scroll is typically very challenging for a student to read because it lacks Hebrew vowel markings while also having very condensed text with minimal line spacing.

Hebrew schooling can be either an educational regimen separate from secular education, in a similar fashion to Sunday school among Christians; education focusing on topics of Jewish history and learning the Hebrew language; or a primary-, secondary-, or college-level educational institution in which some or all of the classes are taught in Hebrew. The first usage is more common in the United States, while the second is used elsewhere bar Israel—for example, in reference to the Colegio Hebreo Unión in Barranquilla, Colombia, or the Associated Hebrew Schools in Toronto, Canada.

== History ==
According to an article in the Jewish Quarterly Review entitled "The Jewish Sunday School Movement in the United States" and printed in 1900, "the exact beginning of the American Jewish Sunday schools is obscured by uncertainty and difficulty of opinion", though it is largely credited with the works of Rebecca Gratz, a Philadelphia native, who sought to provide Jewish schooling to those most in need. As students received secular schooling, Gratz understood the need to provide Jewish history and Jewish traditions to those most lacking a basic understanding in Jewish education. In fact, Jewish Sunday school grew largely in response to Christian Sunday school, as a means of providing proper Jewish education to students who otherwise lacked any religious grounding in Jewish traditions and history or lacked the financial means necessary to attend such a school. As a devout Jew, Gratz dedicated her life to helping the poor and neglected. In 1818, "under the sponsorship of the Female Hebrew Benevolent Society of Philadelphia, the Hebrew Sunday School Society of Philadelphia was created on 4 March, her birthday, with about 60 students". To this day, Rebecca Gratz is referenced as "the foremost American Jewess of her day".

== Curriculum ==
Hebrew school is typically taught on Sunday and on one day of the week – either Tuesday or Wednesday – in the late afternoon, following secular education in private or public schools. Hebrew school education developed in the 1800s and is largely credited to Rebecca Gratz.

Today, typical Hebrew school education starts in kindergarten and culminates in the 10th grade with confirmation. While the idea of confirmation largely grew out of Reform Judaism, it is largely practiced by both the Reform and Conservative movements today. It is based in the Reform and Conservative movements and therefore not practiced in the Jewish Orthodox movement. Instead, Orthodox students attend daily religious schools such as yeshivas, where they study Jewish texts like Torah and the Talmud in greater depth. Orthodox schooling often prepares young boys to become rabbis and involves a deeper level of study than Hebrew school education provides. Whereas both boys and girls study in Hebrew schools in a co-educational environment, education in the Orthodox community is based on single-sex education, with greater emphasis placed on traditional roles for men and women. Some Orthodox congregations offer Hebrew school for non-Orthodox students, such as the TAG Hebrew schools common in Chabad houses.

=== Kindergarten and first grade ===
During kindergarten and first grade, students are introduced to major Jewish holidays and the aleph-bet (Hebrew alphabet). Usually learning at this young age relies on a number of hands-on activities such as crafts, music, cooking and storytelling to engage young learners. Children will often sing songs in Hebrew to improve their Hebrew speaking skills and memory of Hebrew words. Additionally, students might learn the aleph-bet through puzzles and other fun activities. In addition to learning the Hebrew alphabet, children will also learn how to count to ten, how to identify major body parts, learn their Hebrew names and be able to recite prayers such as the blessings for Shabbat. In first grade, students will learn Torah stories such as Adam and Eve, and Joseph in Egypt. First grade is sometimes referred to as "grade aleph", corresponding to the first letter in the Hebrew alphabet.

=== Second grade through fifth grade ===
During these years, students build on a variety of skills and knowledge they have learned as youth while learning new skills like reading Hebrew, reciting common prayers such as the Shema and V'ahavta, and learning by heart the blessings over the candles, wine and bread. Students learn the concept of tzedakah (charity), become acquainted with Jewish rituals and customs, and gain a better understanding of Jewish history and the land of Israel. Classes may also include lessons on Jewish ethics and morality. In the earlier years of Hebrew school, children explore God, spirituality and ethics. For example, God is one, God created the world, and God brought the Jews out of Egypt. In order to make Hebrew school a fun atmosphere for learning, and to teach children the mitzvot of Judaism, children will bake challah for Shabbat, have class in a sukkah during Sukkot, or light candles during Hanukkah. These experiences teach children about the holidays and mitzvot better than just reading about them.

== Bar/Bat Mitzvah preparation ==
One of the most important events to take place during Jewish education is the celebration of the Bar and Bat Mitzvah. Bar/Bat Mitzvah education begins in the 6th and 7th grade, when students are provided with an instructor – usually a rabbi or cantor – and begin studying their torah and haftorah portion by learning to use cantillation, a system for chanting sacred texts. Oftentimes children will attend Hebrew school with the sole purpose of learning how to read Hebrew for their Bar/Bat Mitzvah. In these cases, the students will mostly learn the Hebrew words that are in the Torah portion they will be reciting.

== See also ==
- Arabic language school
- Chinese school
- Hindi language school
- Jewish day school
