= Hindi language school =

Hindi language schools are language schools specialized in teaching Hindi as a foreign language to speakers of other languages. There are different types of Hindi language schools based on their focused branch, target audience, methods of instruction delivery, cultural atmosphere, and elective courses available.

== Origins ==
Modern Standard Hindi (मानक हिन्दी) is the first or second language of most people living in Delhi, Uttar Pradesh, Uttarakhand, Chhattisgarh, Himachal Pradesh, Chandigarh, Bihar, Jharkhand, Madhya Pradesh, Haryana, and Rajasthan. Modern Standard Hindi is one of the official languages of India. Hindi schools promote Hindi by teaching children the importance of Hindi in both an economic and geographic perspective. Since 2008, there has been a demand for Hindi teachers particularly in New Jersey and Connecticut to fill teaching positions aimed at competitiveness. It is said that Hindi "... is the new Mandarin ..." in light of global competitiveness with China. The study found that Arabic, Mandarin, Russian, Persian and Hindi are all important languages in the new millennium.

== Major festivals ==
Hindi schools generally celebrate Hindu festivals as part of their teachings. Some of the major holidays as Diwali and Holi are among holidays that are commonly celebrated with festivities.

== Curriculum ==
In general, most Hindi schools have the general mission to bridge the gap between India and American culture. includes vocabulary forrecognizing basic concepts such as animal names, colors, and body parts. This generally includes functional conversational skills, and reading and writing Sanskrit and Devanagari.

== See also ==
- Arabic language school
- Hebrew school
- Chinese school
