= Hokkien influence on Singaporean Mandarin =

Linguistic substrate

Singaporean Hokkien is the largest non-Mandarin Chinese variety spoken in Singapore. As such, it exerts the greatest influence on Colloquial Singaporean Mandarin, resulting in a Hokkien-style Singaporean Mandarin widely spoken in the country.

== Influences on phonology ==
Some Hokkien Singaporeans are unable to accurately pronounce the sounds of Standard Mandarin due to influences from their Hokkien mother tongue. These include consonants such as f, z, zh, s, r. They also pronounce some vowels and rhymes such as i, e, en, eng differently. In terms of tone, they often bring the checked tone (Chinese: 入聲) of Hokkien into Mandarin.

== Hokkien-derived vocabulary ==
The use of Hokkien vocabulary in Singaporean Mandarin can be categorized as such:

1. Use of Hokkien words in lieu of standard Mandarin words (loanwords)
2. Use of Hokkien monosyllabic words in lieu of standard disyllabic Mandarin words (calques)
3. Replacing of Mandarin morphemes with Hokkien morphemes
4. Use of Hokkien word order (in vocabulary) in lieu of standard Mandarin word order
5. Modifying the meaning of Mandarin word using Hokkien words (loaned meaning)

=== Hokkien borrowings ===
Some Hokkien words with the same meaning are used to replace standard Mandarin words.

Singaporean Mandarin (Hokkien loan words)	Standard Mandarin	Definition
面盆 miàn pén	臉盆 liǎn pén	Washbasin
龍溝 lóng gōu	水溝 shuǐ gōu	Ditch
燒水 shāo shuǐ	熱水 rè shuǐ	Hot water
風胎 fēng tāi	車胎 chē tāi	Tire
煮飯 zhǔ fàn	燒飯 shāo fàn or 做飯 zuò fàn	Cooking
一路來 yī lù lái	向來 xiàng lái or 一直 yī zhí	All along

=== Monosyllabic borrowings ===
Some Hokkien mono-syllabic words are used instead of two-syllable words in Mandarin.

== Omission of Mandarin words' suffixes ==
The suffix of certain Mandarin words might be omitted in colloquial Singaporean Mandarin due to the use of Hokkien mono-syllabic words. For instance, the suffix "子 zi" is commonly omitted in colloquial Singaporean Mandarin.

Colloquial Singaporean Mandarin (Hokkien mono-syllabic word)	Standard Mandarin	Definition	Example of Usage (Singaporean Mandarin)
鴨 yā	鴨子 yā zi	Duck	我買了一只鴨 (I bought a duck)
位 wèi	位子 wèi zi	Seat	沒有位了 (No more seats)
裙 qún	裙子 qún zi	Skirt	你的裙太長了 (Your skirt is too long.)
領 lǐng	領子 lǐng zi	Collar	你的領很髒 (Your collar is very dirty.)
石 shí	石頭 shí tou	Stone	這塊石很大 (This stone is very big.)

=== Replacing Mandarin morpheme with Hokkien morpheme ===
A morpheme in Mandarin is removed from a two-syllable word, leaving a one-syllable word, which is used in Hokkien.

Colloquial Singaporean Mandarin (Hokkien morpheme)	Standard Mandarin	Definition	Example of Usage (Singaporean Mandarin)
色 sè	顔色 yán sè	Colour	這塊布什麽色？ (What colour is this cloth?)
力 lì	力氣 lì qi or 力量 lì liang	Strength	我沒有力了 (I have no more strength)
工 gōng	工作 gōng zuò	Work	去找工做 (go and find a work)
明 míng	明白 míng bai	Understand	你一說我就明了 (Once you say it, I've understood it)
銷 xiāo	推銷 tuī xiāo	Sell	他替我銷了很多本書 (He helps me to sell many books)

=== Same meaning, different word order ===
Some multi-syllable words in Standard Mandarin might be used with a different word order (reversed or changed) in Hokkien, and the latter's word order is adopted into Singaporean Mandarin.

Colloquial Singaporean Mandarin (Hokkien word order)	Standard Mandarin	Definition
麵綫 miàn xiàn	綫麵 xiàn miàn	Rice noodle
人客 rén kè	客人 kè rén	Guest
飯盒 fàn hé	盒飯 hé fàn	Small box of meal

=== Modifying the meaning of Mandarin using Hokkien words ===
Certain words in Standard Mandarin have a different meaning in Hokkien, and this difference is adopted by Singaporean Mandarin.

Some examples of these are listed below.

Colloquial Singaporean Mandarin (Hokkien loan word)	Standard Mandarin	Definition	Usage	Notes
肥 féi	胖 pàng	Fat	你最近肥好多了 (You've been fatter recently)	The Mandarin word "肥" is not originally used for a person. Instead, Standard Mandarin uses the word "胖" esp. when referring to a fat person.
爽 shuǎng	痛快 tòng kuai	Happy/Joyful	玩得很爽 (play joyfully)	The Mandarin word "爽" originally means "cool". Here it has been modified to mean "happy".
會 huì	能 néng	Able to	車會過嗎? (Is the car able to cross?)	The word "會" in Standard Mandarin does not mean an action that can probably be realized. "能", which indicates a possibility, is usually used instead.
本事 běn shì	有本事 yǒu běn shì	Capable	他很本事 (He is capable)	The word "本事" in Standard Mandarin is a 'noun'.

== Influences on grammar ==
Singaporean Hokkien has influenced Singaporean Mandarin Grammar in 5 main areas.

=== Word order ===
The word order refers to the order or sequence of how words are arranged in combination. Because of influence from Singaporean Hokkien, the word order in certain phrases are replaced by that of Singaporean Hokkien, or are simultaneously used with that of Singaporean Mandarin.

==== "Verb/object + complement" structure ====
In Standard Mandarin, certain object in predicate structure are put after a complement. However, the "verb/object + complement" structure is used in Singaporean Mandarin.

Examples are shown in the table below:

Colloquial Singaporean Mandarin	Standard Mandarin	Translation	Grammar Notes
你上課完再去吧！ nǐ shàng kè wán zài qù ba	你上完課再去吧！ nǐ shàng wán kè zài qù ba	You go only after you've finished lessons!	The object "課" is put before the complement "完", instead of after.
考試完你再來！ kǎo shì wán nǐ zài lái	考完試你再來！ kǎo wán shì nǐ zài lái	Come only after you've finished the exam!	The object "試" is put before the complement "完", instead of after.
你吃飯了再寫好嗎？ nǐ chī fàn le zài xiě hǎo ma	你吃了飯再寫好嗎？ nǐ chī liǎo fàn zài xiě hǎo ma	Can you write after you've finished your meal?	The object "飯" is put before the complement "了", instead of after.

==== Changes in overlapping word order ====
Overlapping word order in Singaporean Mandarin sometimes differ from that of Standard Mandarin.

Examples are shown in the table below:

Singaporean Mandarin (overlapping words)	Standard Mandarin (overlapping words)	Translation
想東想西 xiǎng dōng xiǎng xī	東想西想 dōng xiǎng xī xiǎng	Anyhow think
搞七搞八 gǎo qī gǎo bā	七搞八搞 qī gǎo bā gǎo	Anyhow mess around

=== Overlapping of words ===
Certain mono-syllabic adjectives and verbs or two-syllable adjectives and verbs in Singaporean Hokkien have entered into Singaporean Mandarin. These are used together with their counterparts in Standard Mandarin.

Examples are shown in the table below:

Singaporean Mandarin	Standard Mandarin	Translation
花紅紅很好看。 huā hóng hóng hěn hǎo kàn	花紅紅的很好看。 huā hóng hóng de hěn hǎo kàn	The flower is reddish and looks great.
你試看看。 nǐ shì kàn kan	你試試看。 nǐ shì shì kàn	Just try it.
吃看看啦。 chī kàn kàn la	吃吃看啦。 chī chī kàn la	Just try eating it.
把功課做完。 bǎ gōng kè zuò wán	把功課都做完。 bǎ gōng kè dōu zuò wán	Finish all of the homework.
這些你吃吃掉好嗎？ zhè xie nǐ chī chī diào hǎo ma	這些你都吃掉好嗎？ zhè xie nǐ dōu chī diào hǎo ma	Can you finish eating all these?
大家都坐好好。 dà jiā dōu zuò hǎo hǎo	大家都坐得好好的。 dà jiā dōu zuò hǎo hǎo de	Everyone is sitting properly.
他跑快快來拿東西。 tā pǎo kuài kuài lái ná dōng xi	他很快地跑來拿東西。 tā hěn kuài de pǎo lái ná dōng xi	He runs here quickly to take the thing.
他硬硬要去。 tā yìng yìng yào qù	他硬(是)要去。 tā yìng (shì) yào qù	He insists on going.
不要亂亂寫。 bù yào luàn luàn xiě	不要亂寫。 bù yào luàn xiě	Don't anyhow write.
你久久才來一次。 nǐ jiǔ jiǔ cái lái yī cì	你很久才來一次。。 nǐ hěn jiǔ cái lái yī cì	He came only once after a long time.
吃飽飯出去散步散步。 chī bǎo fàn chū qù sàn bù sàn bù	吃飽飯出去散散步。 chī bǎo fàn chū qù sàn sàn bù	Go for a stroll after you've finished your meal.
大家見面見面一下也好。 dà jiā jiàn miàn jiàn miàn yī xià yě hǎo	大家見見面也好。 dà jiā jiàn jiàn miàn yě hǎo or 大家見一下面也好。dà jiā jiàn yī xià miàn yě hǎo	It's good everyone of us meet for a while

=== Omission ===
Certain components of a sentence that are used in Standard Mandarin are omitted in colloquial Singaporean Mandarin, due to Hokkien influence on the latter.

==== Omission of directional verbs ====
Certain directional verbs are omitted or dropped in Singaporean Mandarin.

Examples are shown in the table below:

Singaporean Mandarin (Hokkien-style omission)	Standard Mandarin	Translation	Notes
車子太大，不能進。 chē zǐ tài dà, bù néng jìn	車子太大，不能進去。 chē zǐ tài dà, bù néng jìn qù	The car is too big, it cannot get in.	The directional verb "去" has been omitted.
考試成績還沒出。 kǎo shì chéng jī hái méi chū	考試成績還沒出來。 kǎo shì chéng jī hái méi chū lai	The exam results haven't come out.	The directional verb "來" has been omitted.

==== Omission of the word "得" ====
The word "得" used in the sentence structure between a verb and a complement has been omitted in colloquial Singaporean Mandarin

Examples are shown in the table below:

Singaporean Mandarin (omission of the word "得")	Standard Mandarin	Translation
你吃很慢。 nǐ chī hěn màn	你吃得很慢。 nǐ chī de hěn màn	You eat very slowly.
這種事我見太多了。 zhè zhǒng shì wǒ jiàn tài duō le	這種事我見得太多了。 zhè zhǒng shì wǒ jiàn dé tài duō le	I've seen this thing too many times.

==== Omission of certain numbers ====
Certain numbers, which are expressed in Standard Mandarin, are omitted in colloquial Singaporean Mandarin.

Examples are shown in the table below:

Singaporean Mandarin (omission of certain numbers)	Standard Mandarin	Translation	Notes
塊半。 kuài bàn	一塊五毛。 yī kuài wǔ máo	One dollar and fifty cents (money)	The number "一" (one) has been omitted
尺二。 chǐ èr	一尺二。 yī chǐ èr	1.2 feet (length)	The number "一" (one) has been omitted
百三。 bǎi sān	一百三十。 yī bǎi sān shí	One hundred and thirty	The number "一" (one) has been omitted
兩萬五元。 liǎng wàn wǔ yuán	兩萬五千元。 liǎng wàn wǔ qiān yuán	Twenty five thousand dollars	The number "千" (thousand) has been omitted

=== Word groupings and arrangements ===
Certain word groupings and arrangements in colloquial Singaporean Mandarin sentences are greatly influenced by Hokkien.

==== Use of the words "有" and "無" ====
In Mandarin, the words "有" and "無" generally do not act as complementary verbs. But due to influence from Hokkien, colloquial Singaporean Mandarin uses them as complementary verbs.

Examples are shown in the table below:

Singaporean Mandarin (Hokkien influenced)	Standard Mandarin	Translation
你聽有嗎？我聽有。 nǐ tīng yǒu ma? wǒ tīng yǒu.	你聽(得)懂嗎？我聽(得)懂。 nǐ tīng dé dǒng ma? wǒ tīng dé dǒng	Do you understand me?
他看有，我看沒有。 tā kàn yǒu wǒ kàn méi yǒu	他看得見，我看不見。 tā kàn dé jiàn, wǒ kàn bú jiàn	He could see, I cannot see.
這本書我找有了。 zhè běn shū wǒ zhǎo yǒu le	這本書我找到了。 zhè běn shū wǒ zhǎo dào le	I found this book

==== Use of the word "到" in lieu of "得" ====
In a "verb+complement" sentence structure, standard Mandarin uses the word 得 to link the verb and complement. Singapore Mandarin, due to influence from Hokkien, uses the word 到 instead.

Examples are shown in the table below:

Singaporean Mandarin (Hokkien influenced)	Standard Mandarin	Translation
我氣到半死。 wǒ qì dào bàn sǐ	我氣得半死。 wǒ qì dé bàn sǐ	I am so angry half-dead.
害到我白忙一場。 hài dào wǒ bái máng yī cháng	害得我白忙一場。 hài dé wǒ bái máng yī cháng	It wastes all my effort.
我被他弄到很不好意思。 wǒ bèi tā nòng dào hěn bù hǎo yì si	我被他弄得很不好意思。 wǒ bèi tā nòng dé hěn bù hǎo yì si	He makes me feel embarrassed.

==== Use of the word "去" ====
Certain Singapore Mandarin sentence structures use the word 去 as the resultative complement, where another character (such as 掉) might be used in Standard Mandarin.

Examples are shown in the table below:

Singaporean Mandarin (Hokkien influenced)	Standard Mandarin	Translation
杯子破去了。 bēi zi pò qù le	杯子破掉了。 bēi zi pò diào le	The cup has broken.
錢用去了。 qián yòng qù le	錢用掉了。 qián yòng diào le or 錢用完了。 qián yòng wán le	The money is used up.
椅子已經壞去。 yǐ zi yǐ jīng huài qù	椅子已經壞掉。 yǐ zi yǐ jīng huài diào	The chair has been broken

==== Use of Hokkien classifiers ====
A classifier (measure words) which is used with a certain noun in Hokkien might also be used similarly in Singapore Mandarin with the same noun, whereas another classifier might be used for that same word in Standard Mandarin.

Examples are shown in the table below:

Singaporean Mandarin (Hokkien measure word)	Standard Mandarin	Translation	Notes
一粒球。 yī lì qiú	一個球。 yī gè qiú	A ball	The word "粒" (lì) is a Hokkien measure word
一只飛機。 yī zhī fēi jī	一架飛機。 yī jià fēi jī	An aeroplane	The word "只" (zhī) is a Hokkien measure word
一支刀。 yī zhī dāo	一把刀。 yī bǎ dāo	A knife	The word "支" (zhī) is a Hokkien measure word

=== Sentences ===
Certain sentence structures used in Singapore Mandarin are influenced by Hokkien, and differ from their Standard Mandarin counterparts.

Some cases are listed in the following sub-sections.

==== Use of the word "有" ====
The word "有" (yǒu) is usually added in front of a verb or verb predicate to indicate an existing action or completed status.

Singaporean Mandarin (Hokkien influenced)	Standard Mandarin	Translation
我有看見他。 wǒ yǒu kàn jiàn tā	我看見他了。 wǒ kàn jiàn tā le	I saw him
有在家嗎？ yǒu zài jiā ma	在家嗎？ zài jiā ma	At home?
我明明有給你。 wǒ míng míng yǒu gěi nǐ	我明明給了你。 wǒ míng míng gěi le nǐ	I obviously gave you

==== Use of the word "會" ====
The use of word "會" (huì) [literally "can"] is used in colloquial Singaporean Hokkien, and such a use has entered Singapore Mandarin. The sense of 會 as "can" in Standard Mandarin is generally limited to knowledge or skilled ability, such as ability to speak a language, but in Singaporean Mandarin it is broader and closer to the meaning of "can" in English, which indicates possibility or ability generally.

Singaporean Mandarin (Hokkien influenced)	Standard Mandarin	Translation
車子會過嗎？ chē zǐ huì guò ma	車子能過嗎？ chē zǐ néng guò ma	Can the car cross?
到宏茂橋會遠嗎？ dào hóng mào qiáo huì yuǎn ma	到宏茂橋(很)遠嗎？ dào hóng mào qiáo hěn yuǎn ma	Is it far to travel to Ang Mo Kio?
東西很多，吃會飽。 dōng xi hěn duō, chī huì bǎo	東西很多，能吃飽(吃得飽)。 dōng xi hěn duō, néng chī bǎo (chī dé bǎo)	There are many things, you can fill your stomach

==== Pronunciation of the word "了" ====
The word "了" is often pronounced as "liǎo" instead of "le".

Singaporean Mandarin (Hokkien influenced)	Standard Mandarin	Translation
機器壞了 jī qì huài liǎo	機器壞(掉)了 jī qì huài diào le	Machine broke down
人走了 rén zǒu liǎo	人走(掉)了 rén zǒu diào le	The person is gone

==== Use of the Hokkien sentence-final particles "嘛", "啦" or "咧" ====
Colloquial Singaporean Mandarin often involves the addition of Hokkien sentence-final particles such as "嘛" (ma), "啦" (la) or "咧" (lēh).

Singaporean Mandarin (Hokkien influenced)	Standard Mandarin	Definition
下午到我家玩嘛。 xià wǔ dào wǒ jiā wán ma	下午到我家玩。 xià wǔ dào wǒ jiā wán	Come to my place for fun this afternoon
你快點去啦。 nǐ kuài diǎn qù la	你快點去。 nǐ kuài diǎn qù	Quickly go.
不是這樣咧。 bú shì zhè yàng lēh	不是這樣。 bú shì zhè yàng	It's not like this.

== See also ==
- Singaporean Mandarin
- Standard Singaporean Mandarin
- Languages of Singapore
- Chinese in Singapore
- Speak Mandarin Campaign
- Singapore Chinese characters
- Standard Mandarin
- Taiwanese Mandarin
- Malaysian Mandarin
- Singaporean Hokkien
