= Aldiwan Arabic Language Center =

Address
- 12 Naguib Mahfooz Street, Off Abbas Al Akaad Street; Nasr City, Cairo; Egypt
- Coordinates: 30°04′N 31°33′E

Information
- Type: Arabic language school
- Established: 1997
- Color(s): Yellow, red, brown and black
- Mascot: Islamic octagonal star, with book inside, and a writing feather
- Website: www.aldiwancenter.com

Aldiwan Arabic Language Center, briefly Aldiwan Center, is an Arabic language school based in Cairo, Egypt and established in 1997. It focuses on providing Modern Standard Arabic (MSA) certificates and Egyptian Colloquial Arabic (ECA) courses.

== Name alternatives and origin ==
Aldiwan Center has itself used, and has been referred to by others, by many similar names in spelling and in pronunciation on websites, advertising, and printed materials.

=== Origin of the name ===
This might refer to the variety of writing choices in writing the same Arabic word Diwan (Arabic: ديوان precedented by Al (Arabic: ال, which is the definite article in Arabic; in English, to be: Aldiwan (Arabic: الديوان, as one word, not two separate words: the article, as there is no article in English named "Al" unless the user wants to show that it is an article, then the name itself. The term Diwan or Divan (دیوان) is a Persian word and can refer to:

- Divan or diwan, an oriental high governmental body, such as the Imperial council in the former Ottoman Empire and its successor states
- Diwan (title) (dewan or divan), a number of Middle Eastern titles used in various languages for high officials, especially of cabinet rank, or as a rank of nobility in South Asia
- Diwan (poetry), a collection of Arabic, Persian or Urdu poetry

For more meanings of the word, please see Diwan.

=== Alternative used names ===
Alternatives of the name of Aldiwan Center found in references are: AlDiwan, ALDIWAN, AL DIWAN, AL Diwan, Al Diwan, Al-Diwan, Addiwan, and Ad-diwan (last two are exact transliterations used by some websites), all followed by the word "Center", and also "Centre".

== Accreditation and credit courses ==
The center is nationally accredited as an Arabic language instruction school in Egypt. While independent sources indicate that courses offered at Al Diwan Center are recognized and credited by some US and Canadian universities, from which scholarship holders receive university-level credits, Al Diwan Center has no published information yet on this issue.

== Methods of instruction ==
Aldiwan Center claims implementation of the Audio-Lingual Method in teaching Arabic as a foreign language with a communicative approach in teaching Arabic as a foreign language, which is based on the behaviorist theory of learning.

== Courses of Arabic and Quran ==
Aldiwan Center is an Arabic language school, whose main focus is language instruction, while providing Tajwid, and Arabic calligraphy courses is extra effort on the behalf of Aldiwan to enhance the students' skills, but not the mainstream.

== Publications and software ==
Aldiwan Center has published many textbooks for teachers of Arabic as a foreign language, compared to those of the American University in Cairo and other reputable academic institutions, which resulted in a positive opinion of some students. It also kept interest in incorporating technology in its learning materials, as voice overs of its textbooks and multimedia presentations. Outside the classroom materials they developed electronic dictionaries and how-to guides.

== Relationship with other educational institutions ==
Aldiwan Center has been in a high-profile with many of the US students and professors of high-ranking universities who elect to use its services. Aldiwan has been publishing for years its acceptance of US and Canadian universities’ scholarships with positive testimonials from their students.

== Notable students ==
=== Individuals ===
- Suhaib Webb, prominent American Muslim preacher and da'i
- Sami Yusuf, British singer-songwriter Muslim

=== Institutions and groups ===
- James Madison University,
- Muslim American Society (MAS) Youth
- Islamic American University (IAU), USA

== Branches ==
=== Domestic ===
- Nasr City, Cairo
- Garden City, Cairo
- Maadi, Cairo

=== International ===
- Setapak, Kuala Lumpur, Malaysia (Joint Venture)

== See also ==
- Arabic language
- Studying Arabic language
- Arabic language school
- Audio-Lingual Method
- Egyptian Arabic
