= Yamasa Institute =

Coordinates: 34°55′34.49″N 137°9′45.79″E

The Yamasa Institute Japanese School
- Type: Private language school
- Established: 1989
- Students: approx. 150
- Location: Okazaki, Aichi, Japan
- Website: www.yamasa.org

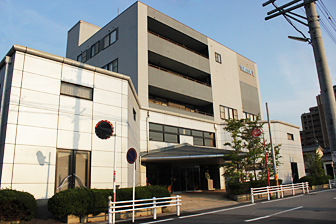
YAMASA II, the campus center.

The Yamasa Institute (Japanese: YAMASA言語文化学院) is a private Japanese Language school located in Okazaki, Aichi Prefecture.

The Institute began language instruction in 1989, and was founded through the Hattori Foundation, a philanthropic educational organization established in 1919. The Yamasa Institute is one of only 17 accredited Japanese language schools in Aichi. The school originally occupied one floor of the “Yamasa II” office block, but has grown to incorporate most of the building.

The Institute is accredited by the Nisshinkyo, the governing body established by the Japanese Government (Ministry of Education, Ministry of Foreign Affairs, Ministry of Justice) and education providers. They also have programs that issue student visas.

The school conducts instruction in a wide range of courses relating to Japanese language and culture, with its main programs being the SILAC (short acquisition) options and the AIJP (intensive) courses.

The school accommodates approximately 150 students during peak time in the Northern Hemisphere summer holidays. Since its inception, Yamasa has provided Japanese language tuition to students from over 80 countries.

The school also provides housing to almost all students, and runs an extensive Homestay programme with families in the Okazaki and Mikawa regions.
