= Mediacorp 8 =

- Country: Singapore
- Broadcast area: Singapore; Malaysia (Johor); Indonesia (Riau Islands)
- Network: Mediacorp TV
- Headquarters: Mediacorp Campus, 1 Stars Avenue, Singapore 138507

Programming
- Language: Mandarin
- Picture format: 1080i HDTV (downscaled to 16:9 576i for the SDTV feed)

Ownership
- Owner: Mediacorp Pte Ltd
- Sister channels: U 5 Suria; Vasantham; CNA

History
- Launched: 31 August 1963; 62 years ago (Test transmissions); 23 November 1963; 62 years ago (Official)

Links
- Website: Channel 8

Availability

Terrestrial
- Digital terrestrial television: UHF CH 31 554MHz DVB-T2 Channel 3 (HD)

Streaming media
- meWATCH: Available on meWATCH website or mobile app (Singapore only)

Mediacorp 8 (Chinese: 8频道) is a Singaporean Mandarin-language free-to-air terrestrial television channel in Singapore, owned by state media conglomerate Mediacorp. The channel broadcasts general entertainment and news programming in the Mandarin language, including original and imported programming.

The channel began a series of experimental broadcasts on 31 August 1963, and officially launched on 22 November 1963. As with its sister 5, the channel initially aired programming in all four of Singapore's official languages, with 8 initially having a particular focus on the Chinese and Tamil communities. In 1973, this scope was formalised, with 8 primarily broadcasting Chinese and Tamil-language programmes. In compliance with the government's Speak Mandarin Campaign, Chinese programming on the channel later broadcast solely in Mandarin Chinese. In 1995, Tamil programmes moved to Prime 12, with Channel 8 focusing exclusively on Mandarin programming.

== History ==
=== Television Singapura/RTS ===
When television service in Singapore was announced in January 1963, a second channel broadcasting on Channel 8 was announced, slated to begin operations "between August and September, depending on conditions".

Channel 8 began its test transmissions on Saturday, 31 August 1963, Malaysia's national day (at the time known as Solidarity Day). Its first day consisted of a Hokkien film, the Tamil film Naan Petra Selvam, repeats of India's participation in the South East Asian Cultural Festival and Singapore Celebrates. A second test transmission took place between 16 and 20 September of that year and devoted much of its time to the week-long celebrations, to coincide with the historic Proclamation of Malaysia, and the political campaigns leading up to the 1963 General Election.

After only broadcasting on "special occasions", Channel 8 officially began fully broadcasting on 23 November 1963 at 7:40 p.m. as "Saluran 8 Televisyen Singapura" and aired at first in Chinese (including Mandarin, dialects of Chinese and Cantonese) and Tamil, broadcasting daily for two and a half hours (closing at 10:10 p.m.), aiming to increase to the same hours as its sister station 5, which was launched on 2 April that year with a mix of shows in every language of Singapore at the time. Channel 8 rebroadcast the news broadcast from Channel 5 every day of the week except on Thursdays, on tape delay (due to the lack of its own news service). Following the separation from Malaysia on 9 August 1965, Channel 8 became part of Television Singapore and was later integrated as part of "Radio Television Singapore". This led to the expansions of the network, including a move to the new $3.6 million Television Centre in Caldecott Hill on 26 August 1966.

On 16 August 1965, one week after Singapore achieved independence, Channel 8 did not broadcast due to the effects of a fire that damaged TV Singapore's main studio.

In 1967, Channel 8 became the first Singaporean channel to begin regular weekday daytime broadcasts, when it began to broadcast the Educational Television Service (ETS)—a block of educational programmes produced by the Ministry of Education for students of elementary and secondary levels. Following the ETS blocktime, the channel had a transmission break to allow for the handover to its own broadcast crews.

On 27 March 1973, Channel 5 and 8 began to divide their programming based on languages, with Channel 8 focusing solely on Chinese- and Tamil-language content outside of ETS hours (which were multilingual).

Channel 8 began broadcasting in colour on 1 May 1974 (ETS was one of the last programs to switch to colour later). In 1978, all its Chinese language programming as well as advertisements, as a result of the government's Speak Mandarin Campaign, began to be broadcast solely in the Mandarin dialect.

At first, Channel 8 drama productions used 16mm film, before transitioning to videotape in 1987–88. Its variety programming (either live or taped), as well as some children's programs, had always been videotape productions since the start of colour television.

=== SBC 8 ===
In the fall of 1982, Channel 8 debuted the country's pioneer modern-style Mandarin language TV movie, Seletar Robbery, the hit that spawned the start of successful drama productions in the years that followed. 1983 saw a new look for its mini-series division, with titles like Army Series and Flying Fish becoming hit favorites.

In January 1984, SBC 8 began airing its self-produced local drama programming for two hours a week. The Awakening, the country's first full-length drama series on TV, was the first full-blown drama ever to be produced by the channel, and proved to be so popular that the channel added another hour of local drama content later in September 1984. An additional hour was added in March 1985, which brought weekly drama programming to four hours. SBC aimed to have five hours a week of local drama by August 1985.

SBC 8 began airing local hour-long weekday drama series at the 9:30 pm slot on 1 January 1987; previous dramas had aired for only a half hour each. The new drama series had 12 different titles airing each year.

In April 1987, SBC 8 replaced the magazine show Family Hour with the back-to-back drama slot One Plus One, due to stiff competition from Malaysia's TV2 and TV3 which aired Cantonese dramas in the 7 pm slot. Family Hour and Live From Studio One merged to become Studio One Presents and aired weeknights at 8:30 pm. One Plus One was replaced by an hour-long drama slot in 1993.

SBC 8 extended its broadcasting hours on Sundays in 1988.

In October 1988, local Chinese dramas began airing ten-and-a-half hours a week instead of seven-and-a-half hours, with the addition of a 6:30 pm drama airing three times a week.

Beginning 1 August 1990, Channel 8 began airing in stereo all its Chinese and Tamil language productions.

SBC 8 gradually increased its broadcasting hours by six hours on Saturdays in January 1993 and three hours on weekdays in June 1993, a 40% increase in airing hours in contrast to the previous year. Much of the expanded hours were filled with drama, children's programmes, game shows, and documentaries. A two-minute late-evening news update was added on 1 January 1993. Some of the English programming was removed, while special Tamil programming was set to air on all 11 public holidays instead of five. The ETS service was moved to Channel 12 as CDIS at the same time.

=== Channel 8 ===
SBC 8 introduced a new logo and on-air graphics in June 1994. From this period, SBC 8 was known as Channel 8. The relaunch was meant to reinforce Channel 8 as the channel "for the HDB homeland". Along with the relaunch, the evening news bulletin moved to 10 pm and drama series were shown at 9 pm. The theme song was written and sung by Singaporean twins, Paul and Peter Lee. In preparation for the relaunch, a two-hour special programme, Be A Part Of 8, aired on 28 May 1994, followed by special programmes through the night. Tamil viewers were treated to an Indian musical and an hour-long variety show the next day. The relaunch was promoted through mini-exhibitions and roadshows.

SBC 8's drama productions comprised 520 hours a year in 1994 compared to 20 hours a year in 1984.

Tamil programmes moved to Prime 12 in September 1995, and Channel 8 has since focused on the Chinese-speaking audiences of Singapore.

Channel 8 started airing 24 hours a day on 1 September 1995. It was privatised on 12 February 2001 as part of Mediacorp.

In January 2005, MediaCorp took over Channel 8's competitor U from SPH MediaWorks, making it a sister channel. To emphasize the integration, Channel 8 also changed its name in Chinese from Dì bā bō dào (Chinese: 第八波道) to Bā píndào (Chinese: 八频道) to match that of Channel U (Chinese: 優频道; pinyin: Yōu píndào).

== Channel 8i ==
Channel 8 had a sister television channel named Channel 8i (Channel 8 International) that existed from 19 November 2011 to 1 December 2016. The channel launched exclusively on Indovision and its schedule consisted exclusively of Mediacorp's Chinese dramas, airing on a 6-hour wheel. The following month, it was introduced in Australia as part of Fetch TV's Chinese package. It was made available in Singapore as a free channel on Toggle on 1 February 2013, upon the service's launch.
