= Joseph Simon (1712–1804) =

American Jewish leader (1712–1804)

- Born: 1712
- Died: January 24, 1804 (aged 92); Lancaster, Pennsylvania, US
- Occupations: Businessman and Entrepreneur

Joseph Simon (1712 – January 24, 1804) was the leader of the Jewish community in Lancaster, Pennsylvania, during the eighteenth century.

== Life ==
Joseph Simon was born in 1712. He immigrated to Lancaster, Pennsylvania, from England by 1740. In 1747, he and Isaac Nunes Henriques purchased one half acre of land for the cemetery in which he is buried. It is the fourth-oldest Jewish cemetery in the United States. At this time Lancaster had enough Jewish men living in the community to support a minyan, and religious services were held at Simon's house.

Simon was a successful trader and owned enormous tracts of land in the West; among others, he was a business partner of William Henry—a gunsmith, merchant, and, later, important patriot during the American Revolution. In 1759, he helped found the Juliana Public Library and in 1764 the Union Fire Company. In 1767, Thomas Barton, rector of St. James' Church in Lancaster, described Simon to Sir William Johnson as "a worthy, honest Jew and principal merchant of this place... He is esteemed a main fair in his dealings and honest from Principle."

Simon married Rosa Buun and the two had ten children. One of their granddaughters was Rebecca Gratz, reputed to be one of the most beautiful women in America, and Walter Scott may have modeled Rebecca in Ivanhoe on her.

== Death ==
Simon died on January 24, 1804, in Lancaster, Pennsylvania and was buried at Shaarai Shomayim Cemetery. At the time of his death, he was the last known colonial Jewish resident of Lancaster, with much of the Jewish community having moved to Philadelphia.
