= Chinese school =

School that teaches Chinese language

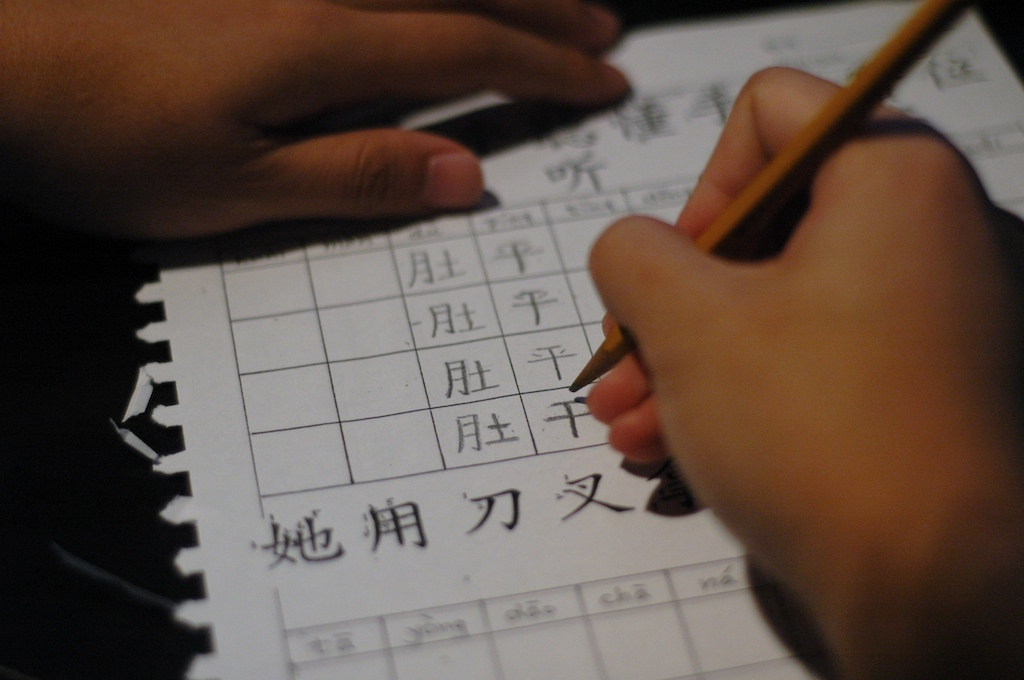
- A student practices writing Chinese characters.
- Traditional Chinese: 中文學校
- Simplified Chinese: 中文学校
Transcriptions
Standard Mandarin
- Hanyu Pinyin: zhōngwén xuéxiào
Yue: Cantonese
- Yale Romanization: jūngmán hohk'haauh

A Chinese school (simplified Chinese: 中文学校; traditional Chinese: 中文學校; pinyin: zhōngwén xuéxiào; Cantonese Yale: jūngmán hohk'haauh) is a school that is established for the purpose of teaching the varieties of Chinese (in particular, Mandarin and Cantonese), though the purpose can vary to teaching different aspects of Chinese culture such as Chinese art, calligraphy, history and martial arts. The programs can either be an independent institution or a part of an existing educational institution.

== Curriculum ==
A typical Chinese school curriculum can vary depending on the particular school. However, the Standard Chinese language and various aspects of Chinese culture such as Chinese art, Chinese history and Chinese martial arts are typically included.

=== Chinese language ===
Most native speakers of English find these sounds difficult.

The Chinese language is spoken by nearly 1.2 billion people or about 16% of the world's population. Chinese schools typically teach both written and spoken Chinese. With the growing importance and influence of China's economy globally, Mandarin instruction is gaining popularity in schools in the United States, and has become an increasingly popular subject of study amongst the young in the Western world, as in the UK. One of the teaching tools used widely in Chinese schools is the Pinyin system, also known as the official phonetic system for transcribing the Mandarin pronunciations of Chinese characters into the Latin alphabet which was developed in the 1950s based on earlier forms of romanization. It was published by the Chinese government in 1958 and revised several times. The International Organization for Standardization (ISO) adopted pinyin as an international standard in 1982.

=== Chinese calligraphy ===
Calligraphy tools

Written Chinese as taught in Chinese schools uses methods as defined by the Shūfǎ (書法) from China, which means "the way/method/law of writing". (Note: 書 being here used as in 楷书/楷書, etc, and meaning "writing style".) Curricula in Chinese writing typically focus on stroke order and repetition. Schools also teach the relationship of words based on their Chinese radicals, as many words come from ideas that relate to a particular topic. Stroke orders of words are also important as they dictate how Chinese words can be found in a Chinese dictionary.

=== Chinese art ===
Chinese art is taught in Chinese schools following the techniques as established in Chinese painting. For example:

- Gong-bi (工筆), meaning "meticulous", uses highly detailed brushstrokes that delimits details very precisely. It is often highly coloured and usually depicts figural or narrative subjects. It is often practised by artists working for the royal court or in independent workshops. Bird-and-flower paintings were often in this style.
- Ink and wash painting, in Chinese Shui-mo or (水墨) also loosely termed watercolour or brush painting, and also known as "literati painting", as it was one of the "four arts" of the Chinese Scholar-official class. In theory this was an art practised by gentlemen, a distinction that begins to be made in writings on art from the Song dynasty, though in fact the careers of leading exponents could benefit considerably. This style is also referred to as "xie yi" (寫意) or freehand style.

=== Chinese martial arts ===
Chinese martial arts, sometimes called "kung fu" are a number of fighting styles that have developed over the centuries in China. Chinese schools often offer such programs as part of their curriculum as it is one of the fundamental aspects of Chinese culture. Though some martial art styles may have originated in other parts of Asia such as karate and tae kwon do, they are sometimes taught as though it were part of the Chinese heritage.

== Major events ==
=== Chinese New Year ===
Many Chinese schools put on a Chinese New Year gala as the festival is an important Chinese festival celebrated at the turn of the Chinese calendar. It is also known as the Spring Festival, the literal translation of the modern Chinese name. Chinese New Year celebrations traditionally run from Chinese New Year's Eve, the last day of the last month of the Chinese calendar, to the Lantern Festival on the 15th day of the first month, making the festival the longest in the Chinese calendar. The first day of the New Year falls between January 21 and February 20.

== See also ==
- Chinese as a foreign language
- Confucius Institute, partnerships between colleges and universities in China and those in other countries

Other cultures and languages have similar setups. For example:

- Hebrew school
- Arabic language school
- Hindi language school
- Français langue étrangère
- English as a second or foreign language
