= Islamic American University =

American university in Southfield, Michigan

- الجامعة الإسلامية الأمريكيّة
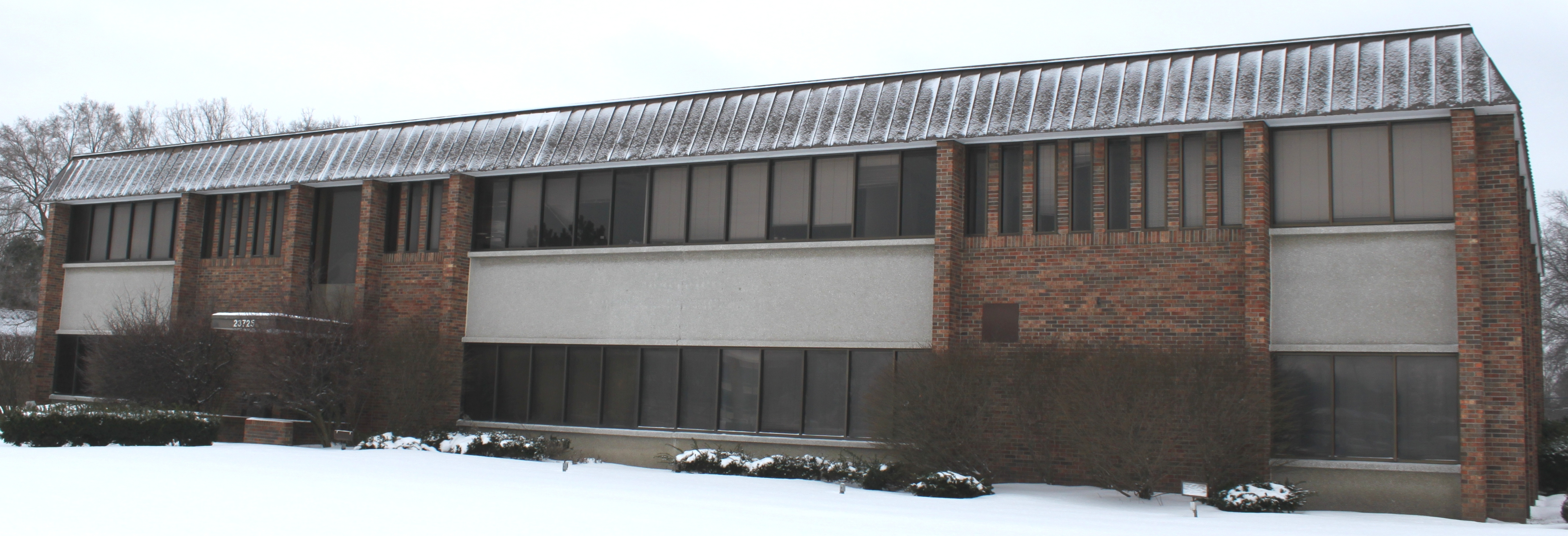
- Islamic American University building
- Type: Private Islamic University
- Established: 2002
- Website: www.islamicau.org

The Islamic American University (Arabic: الجامعة الإسلامية الأمريكيّة) is located in Southfield, Michigan. They offer correspondence and online courses and is one of few Islamic colleges in the United States.

== Academics ==
The university is unaccredited and described as a correspondence college set up to train teachers and preachers. which offers a Certificate of Qur'anic Memorization and Recitation, bachelor's degrees in Islamic Studies and Arabic Language, as well as Masters Degrees in source methodology in Islamic jurisprudence.

== History ==
Founder and President Dr. Salah Sultan. The university grew out of a project of the Muslim American Society.

== Controversies ==
In a 1999 speech at an annual conference of the Islamic Association for Palestine, Sultan had expressed his hope that all Muslim children would dream of martyrdom of the Palestinian cause: "I want every child to sleep on the wound of Palestine and the actions of martyrdom, just like that mother in the country whose son wrote to her that they are to meet in Paradise."

Yusuf al-Qaradawi served as trustee of the university until June 2003.
