= Rebecca Gratz =

American writer (1781–1869)

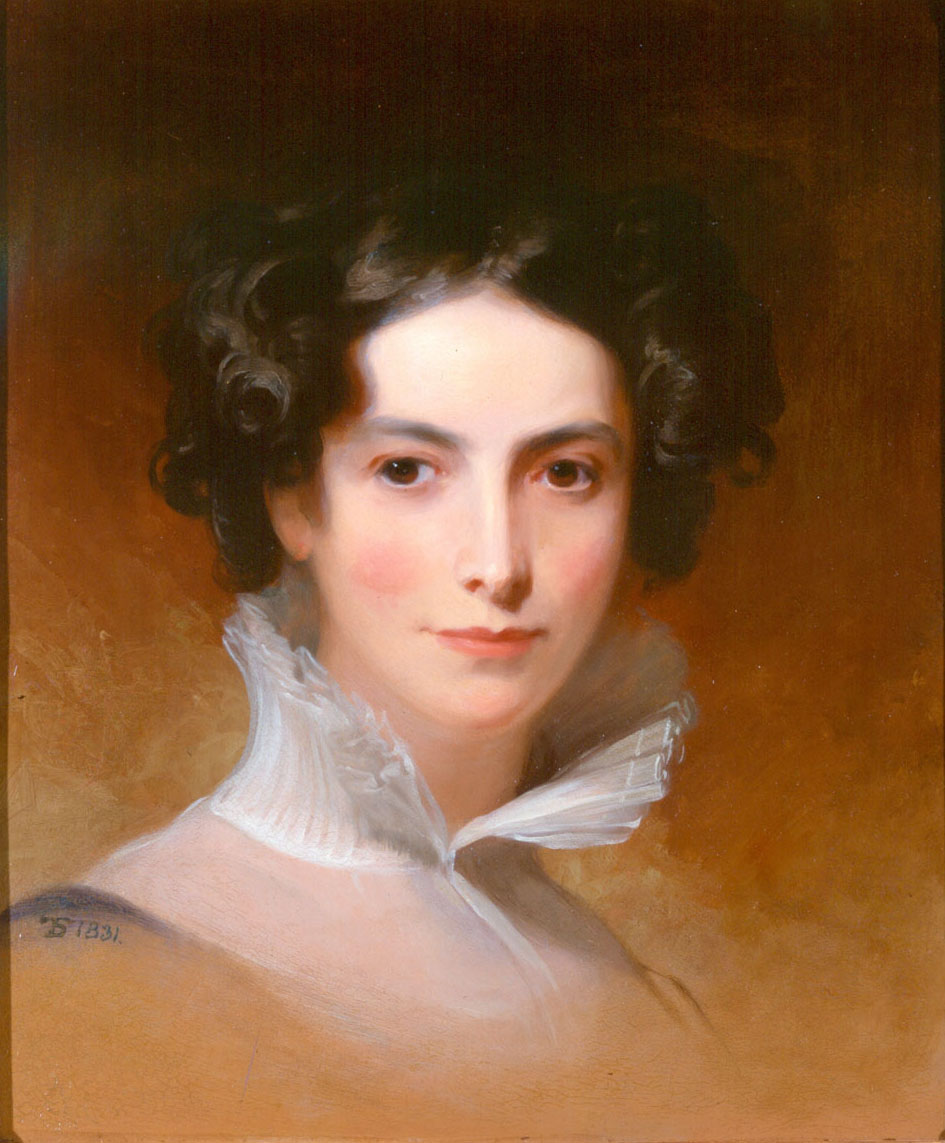
- portrait by Thomas Sully, 1831
- Born: March 4, 1781; Lancaster, Pennsylvania
- Died: August 27, 1869 (aged 88); Philadelphia, Pennsylvania
- Resting place: Mikveh Israel Cemetery

Rebecca Gratz (March 4, 1781 – August 27, 1869) was a Jewish American educator and philanthropist in 19th-century America. She was a member of the Gratz family, who settled in the United States before the Revolutionary War.

== Early life ==
Rebecca Gratz was born on March 4, 1781, in Lancaster, Pennsylvania. She was the seventh of twelve children born to Miriam Simon and Michael Gratz. Her mother was the daughter of Joseph Simon, a preeminent Jewish merchant of Lancaster, while her father, whose surname originally was Grätz, immigrated to America in 1752 from Wielowieś, in German-speaking Silesia. Michael, who was descended from a long line of respected rabbis, and Miriam were observant Jews and active members of Philadelphia's first synagogue, Mikveh Israel.

== Philanthropy ==
In 1801, at the age of 20, Rebecca Gratz helped establish the Female Association for the Relief of Women and Children in Reduced Circumstances, which helped women whose families were suffering after the American Revolutionary War. In 1815, after seeing the need for an institution for orphans in Philadelphia, she was among those instrumental in founding the Philadelphia Orphan Asylum. Four years later, she was elected secretary of its board. She continued to hold this office for forty years. Under Gratz' auspices, a Hebrew Sunday School, the first of its kind in America, was started in 1838. Gratz became both its superintendent and president and assisted in developing its curriculum, resigning in 1864.

Gratz was also one of the founding members of the Female Hebrew Benevolent Society of Philadelphia in 1819. The social services organization was created by a group of women from Congregation Mikveh Israel to support Philadelphia's Jewish women who found themselves unexpectedly without a husband (whether by illness, death or greener pastures). Gratz held the secretary position in the group for close to 40 years.

In 1850, she advocated in The Occident, over the signature A Daughter of Israel, the foundation of a Jewish foster home. Her advocacy was largely instrumental in the establishment of such a home in 1855. Other organizations that came about due to her efforts were the Fuel Society and the Sewing Society.

Gratz is said to have been the model of Rebecca, the daughter of the Jewish merchant Isaac of York, who is the heroine in the novel Ivanhoe by Sir Walter Scott. Scott's attention had been drawn to Gratz's character by Washington Irving, who was a close friend of the Gratz family. The claim has been disputed, but it has also been well sustained in an article entitled "The Original of Rebecca in Ivanhoe", which appeared in The Century Magazine, 1882, pp. 679–682.

Gratz never married. Among the marriage offers she received was one from a Gentile whom she loved but ultimately chose not to marry on account of her faith.

Her portrait was painted twice by the noted American artist Thomas Sully. One of those portraits (both are owned by the Rosenbach Museum) is on display at the National Museum of American Jewish History.

== Death ==
Gratz died on August 27, 1869, in Philadelphia, Pennsylvania and was buried at Mikveh Israel Cemetery. Shortly after her death, her brother Hyman founded and financed Gratz College, a teachers’ college in Philadelphia, in her memory.
