= Female Hebrew Benevolent Society of Philadelphia =

Non-profit organization in Pennsylvania, U.S.

Female Hebrew Benevolent Society of Philadelphia is an American non-profit organization in Philadelphia, Pennsylvania. It is the oldest Jewish charity in the city, and the "oldest Jewish charitable organization in continuous existence in the U.S." The women comprising the Board of Managers accomplish their work quietly but effectively. The division of the city into districts, each being in charge of different managers, enables the Society to administer its charity to needy Jews in different localities. Founded in November 1819, with Rebecca Gratz playing an important role, the society was incorporated in 1837 and chose to remain independent when other charities merged in 1869.

== History ==
Women were the pioneers of Jewish charity work in Philadelphia. In the autumn of 1819, two women resolved to ask assistance of other Jewish women in order to relieve the poverty then existing among the small number of Jews in this city, where there was no charity society to aid them. Their act led to the formation of the Female Hebrew Benevolent Society, a month later (November, 1819), in which Rebecca Gratz assumed an important part, and the two women alluded to-Mrs. Aaron Levy and Miss Hannah Levy-were members of the first Board of Managers. The Society, which was regularly instituted in 1820, received its Articles of Incorporation in the year 1837.

Its objects are thus stated in the Preamble to its Constitution:

In all communities the means of alleviating the sufferings of the poor are considered of high importance by the benevolent and the humane. The subscribers, members of the Hebrew Congregation (Mickvé Israel), of Philadelphia, and citizens of the United States and of the State of Pennsylvania, sensible to the calls of their small society, and desirous of rendering themselves useful to their indigent sisters of the House of Israel, have associated themselves together for the purpose of charity, and in order to make the benefit permanent have adopted this Constitution.

The membership was confined to Jewish women, the dues being $2 yearly. The annual meeting is held on the first Wednesday morning in November, at the residence in the rear of the Synagogue of the Congregation Mickvéh Israel.

When the Society of the United Hebrew Charities was formed in 1869, as the result of a union of small institutions, it was thought that the Female Hebrew Benevolent Society would also enter thereinto. But it preferred to remain apart; performing its own task, and striving to alleviate suffering and poverty with all the means at its disposal. Its charities are dispensed by northern and southern district committees.

== Directors ==
In 1820, its officers were: First Directress, Mrs. Rebecca J. Phillips; Second Directress, Mrs. Bell Cohen; Treasurer, Mrs. S. Bravo; Secretary, Miss Rebecca Gratz; Managers (besides the above), Mrs. Richea Hays, Mrs. Phila Pesoa, Mrs. Miriam Nones, Mrs. Esther Hart, Mrs. Fanny Levy, Mrs. Arabella Phillips, Mrs. Rebecca Moss, Miss Sarah M. Cohen, and Miss Hannah Levy. Among subsequent managers (some of whom, at different times, presided over the Society) were Mrs. Anna Allen, Mrs. Sarah Hart, Mrs. Maria Hackenburg, Miss Louisa B. Hart, Mrs. Sarah Lyon, Mrs. Rebecca C. Hart, Miss Rachel Pesoa, Mrs. Sarah Phillips, Miss Sim'ha Cohen Peixotto, Mrs. Hetty Samuel, Mrs. Matilda H. Cohen, and Miss Ellen Phillips (who was vice-president at her decease, in February, 1891).

The following ladies were elected Managers for 1865:-Mrs. A. Hart, Mrs. A. Allen, Mrs. J. L. Florance, Mrs. B. Lieber, Mrs. P. Goldsmith, Miss R. Gratz, Miss L. B. Hart, Mrs. D. Samuel, Mrs. J. Newhouse, Mrs. G. Cromelien, Mrs. A. S. Wolf, Miss Ellen Phillips, Mrs. Henry Cohen. On motion, the meeting adjourned.

The officers of 1894 were: President, Mrs. Miriam H. Wolf; Vice-president, Mrs. David H. Solis Sr.; Treasurer, Mrs. Isabel R. Weil; Secretary, Mrs. Myrtilla E. Mitchell; Managers, Mrs. Ernest Nusbaum, Mrs. Jonathan M. Emanuel, Mrs. Levy L. Hyneman, Mrs. Jacob Ullman, Mrs. Walter S. Berg, Mrs. Joseph Newhouse, Mrs. Jacob E. Hyneman, Mrs. Charles H. Vendig, and Mrs. Julius S. Daniels.
