= Promote Mandarin Council =

Singaporean language regulator of Mandarin

Logo of the Promote Mandarin Council

The Promote Mandarin Council (traditional Chinese: 推廣華語理事會; simplified Chinese: 推广华语理事会; pinyin: Tuīguǎng huáyǔ lǐshì huì) is a Singaporean organisation established in 1979 as part of then-PM Lee Kuan Yew's programme to promote Mandarin as the preferred language amongst Chinese Singaporeans.

== Background ==
In 1966 the Singapore Government institutionalised a bilingual education policy, under which Singaporean students were required to learn both English and their "designated mother-tongue". For ethnic-Chinese Singaporeans, the designated language was Mandarin, in line with the national language policy pursued in both Nationalist and Communist China. The Goh Report, an evaluation of Singapore's education system by Dr. Goh Keng Swee, claimed that less than 40% of the student population managed to attain the minimum level of competency in two languages. The Government then alleged that learning of Mandarin amongst the Singapore Chinese was hindered by the home use of various varieties of Chinese. These varieties included Hokkien, Teochew, Cantonese and Hakka. Since then, the Singapore Government has pursued a hostile stance against these varieties, and has promoted the use of Mandarin as a universal mother-tongue amongst Singapore Chinese.

== Establishment ==
In 1979, then-PM Lee Kuan Yew decided to establish the Promote Mandarin Commission as an organisation focused entirely on the promotion of the Mandarin language, with the initial goal of eliminating all other Chinese varieties in Singapore within the next decade. In 1998, the Commission was officially renamed as the Promote Mandarin Council.
