= Language school =

School for learning a foreign language

A language school is a school where one studies a foreign language. Classes at a language school are usually geared towards, for example, communicative competence in a foreign language. Language learning in such schools typically supplements formal education or existing knowledge of a foreign language.

Students vary widely by age, educational background, work experience. They usually have the possibility of selecting a specific course according to their language proficiency. According to the Common European Framework of Reference for Languages (CEFR), there are six language levels that define student language proficiency based on their speaking, writing and reading skills. The six levels are grouped into three bands: A1 and A2 (basic user), B1 and B2 (independent user), and C1 and C2 (proficient user).

== Language courses ==
=== English ===
Globally, English language schools have seen the greatest demand over schools for other languages. Over one billion people are said to be learning English in a second language or foreign language context. In the United States alone, ESL learners make up over one-third of all adult, non-academic learners.

==== Accreditations for English Language Schools ====
In England, major accreditations include:

- British Council: Accredits schools meeting high standards in education, teacher qualifications, and facilities.
- English UK: Requires member schools to comply with strict quality standards.
- RELSA: Accredits schools based on rigorous criteria in teaching and facilities.
- Quality English: An international association ensuring top standards for independent schools.

In Malta, accreditation is provided by:

- FELTOM: Accredits schools that meet high-quality standards in teaching, qualifications, and facilities.

=== Arabic ===
Arabic has also grown in popularity in the last decade. Reasons include the continued growth of Islam worldwide (the Koran holy book is in Arabic), as well as cultural, economic and political reasons.

=== Hindi ===
The Hindi language along with the culture of the Indian subcontinent has started to become important due to recent foreign policies, global competitiveness, and emigration from the country. Hindi began to be introduced as a foreign language in some American schools in the 2000s. Instructors in the language were sought to teach from the kindergarten level right up to the university as part of the National Security Language Initiative.

== See also ==
- Language education
- English language learning and teaching
- English as a Foreign or Second Language
- Français langue étrangère
- Arabic language school
- Second language acquisition
