= Arabic language school =

Arabic language schools are language schools specialized in teaching Arabic as a foreign language. There are different types of Arabic language schools based on their focused branch, target audience, methods of instruction delivery, cultural atmosphere, and elective courses available.

== Definition and scope ==
Unlike general language schools that provide Arabic classes and certificates along with other live languages' classes as well, Arabic language schools are those that specialize in Arabic language instruction only, or mainly. Al Diwan Center is an example whose focus is on Arabic only. Examples of a school that cannot be referred to as an "Arabic language school" is the British Council.

While not very big in number, those specialized schools with this focus made them very effective in teaching this subject matter that are regarded by many as difficult compared to other live languages of today. Provided that most of them are located where Arabic is the native mother tongue, they make it ideal for those who want to practice what they learn in a daily life experience.

== Categories ==
Schools that teach Arabic to speakers of other languages are categorized based on the following:

=== Size and levels provided ===
Some schools are large enough to provide graduate-like course curriculum and teaching quality, while others are starting out and provide middle-to-high school level of Arabic teaching.

=== Profitability ===
- Business and for-profit Arabic language schools
  - Most Arabic language schools fall under this category
- Charitable non-profit Arabic language schools
  - Mostly Islamic religious organizations

=== Specialty ===
- MSA only.
- Dialect only.
- Mix of MSA and Dialect.

Many schools provide side courses on related subjects like: Islamic religious courses related to language like Quranic recitation, and Arabic calligraphy.

== Arabic language schools ==
- Aldiwan Arabic Language Center

== See also ==
- ʾIʿrab
- Arabic literature
- Arabic alphabet
- Arabic calligraphy
- List of Islamic terms in Arabic
- Teaching Arabic as a Foreign Language
- Language education
- Second language acquisition
- Applied linguistics
