= Singaporean Hokkien =

Dialect of Hokkien spoken in Singapore

- 新加坡福建話; Sin-ka-pho Hok-kiàn-uē (Tâi-lô); Sin-ka-pho Hok-kiàn-ōe (Pe̍h-ōe-jī)
- Native to: Singapore
- Native speakers: 1.2 million (2017)
- Language family: Sino-Tibetan: Sinitic; Chinese; Min; Coastal Min; Southern Min; Hokkien; Quanzhou and Zhangzhou; Singaporean Hokkien
- Early forms: Proto-Sino-Tibetan: Old Chinese (Note: Min is believed to have split from Old Chinese, rather than Middle Chinese like other varieties of Chinese.); Proto-Min
- Writing system: Chinese characters (Traditional or Simplified); Latin for romanisation (Tâi-lô & Pe̍h-ōe-jī)

Official status
- Official language in: None (de jure) (Note: Singaporean Hokkien was the lingua franca and the dominant variety of Chinese among the Chinese community in Singapore before the late-1980s. It is still spoken today, although to a lesser extent.)
- Regulated by: None

Language codes
- ISO 639-3: nan for Southern Min which encompasses a variety of Hokkien dialects including "Singaporean Hokkien".
- Glottolog: None
- Linguasphere: 79-AAA-jek
- IETF: nan-SG

Singaporean Hokkien
- Traditional Chinese: 新加坡福建話
- Simplified Chinese: 新加坡福建话
- Tâi-lô: Sin-ka-pho Hok-kiàn-uē
Transcriptions
Standard Mandarin
- Hanyu Pinyin: Xīnjiāpō Fújiànhuà
Southern Min
- Hokkien POJ: Sin-ka-pho Hok-kiàn-ōe
- Tâi-lô: Sin-ka-pho Hok-kiàn-uē

Alternative Chinese name
- Traditional Chinese: 新加坡閩南語
- Simplified Chinese: 新加坡闽南语
- Tâi-lô: Sin-ka-pho Bân-lâm-gu / Sin-ka-pho Bân-lâm-gí
Transcriptions
Standard Mandarin
- Hanyu Pinyin: Xīnjiāpō Mǐnnányǔ
Southern Min
- Hokkien POJ: Sin-ka-pho Bân-lâm-gu / Sin-ka-pho Bân-lâm-gí
- Tâi-lô: Sin-ka-pho Bân-lâm-gu / Sin-ka-pho Bân-lâm-gí

Second alternative Chinese name
- Traditional Chinese: 新加坡閩南話
- Simplified Chinese: 新加坡闽南话
- Tâi-lô: Sin-ka-pho Bân-lâm-uē
Transcriptions
Standard Mandarin
- Hanyu Pinyin: Xīnjiāpō Mǐnnánhuà
Southern Min
- Hokkien POJ: Sin-ka-pho Bân-lâm-ōe
- Tâi-lô: Sin-ka-pho Bân-lâm-uē

Singaporean Hokkien (Note: Chinese: 新加坡福建話; Tâi-lô: Sin-ka-pho Hok-kiàn-uē; Pe̍h-ōe-jī: Sin-ka-pho Hok-kiàn-ōe) is a local variety of the Hokkien language spoken natively in Singapore. Within Chinese linguistic academic circles, this dialect of Hokkien is known as Singaporean Minnan. (Note: Chinese: 新加坡閩南語 Tâi-lô: Sin-ka-pho Bân-lâm-gu) It bears similarities with the Amoy dialect in Xiamen and Taiwanese Hokkien in Taiwan.

Hokkien is the Southern Min pronunciation for the province of Fujian, and is generally the term used by the Chinese in Southeast Asia to refer to the Quanzhang dialects. (Note: "Quanzhang" is a combination derived from the first characters of the urban centers of Quanzhou and Zhangzhou.) Singaporean Hokkien heavily views the Amoy dialect as its prestige, and its accent is predominantly based on a mixture of Quanzhou and Zhangzhou speech, with a greater inclination towards the former instead of the latter.

Nevertheless, the grammar and tones of Singaporean Hokkien are still largely based on standard Hokkien. When compared to the prestige Taiwanese accent (Note: 臺語優勢腔) spoken in Tainan and Kaohsiung, the accent and pronunciation of Singaporean Hokkien inclines towards Quanzhou, which is also close to the pronunciation of Taipei and Xiamen, and is less close to that of Tainan, which has a greater inclination towards Zhangzhou. (Note: 漳州腔)

Like many spoken languages in Singapore, Singaporean Hokkien is influenced by other languages spoken in Singapore. For instance, Singaporean Hokkien is influenced to a certain degree by Teochew, and is sometimes regarded by non-Singaporean speakers as a combined Hokkien–Teochew speech. In addition, it incorporates many loanwords from Singapore's four official languages: English, Malay, Mandarin and Tamil. Because of its historical prevalence in Singapore, Singaporean Hokkien has also exerted significant influence on the Singaporean variant of Mandarin.

== History ==
From the 19th until the early half of the 20th century, there was a large influx of Chinese migrants from southern China into Singapore. This led to Chinese constituting almost 75% of Singapore's population. Of these Chinese, many originated from the regions of Amoy/Xiamen, Quanzhou and Zhangzhou in Fujian province. They brought Southern Min to Singapore, which was then propagated throughout the Malayan region. As there was no formal Chinese name for Southern Min in the early 20th century, these migrants began to use their place of origin as the name of their speech, and thus called the variety "Hokkien", referring to Fujian province.

During the 19th century, many traditional private Chinese schools in Singapore (referred to as 私塾仔; su-sio̍k-á) generally used Hokkien to teach Chinese classics and Classical Chinese. However, by the early 20th century, Mandarin began to replace Hokkien as the medium of instruction in Chinese schools after the founding of many Mandarin-medium schools.

During the 1950s and 1960s, many political speeches in Singapore were in Hokkien, in order to reach out to the Chinese community in Singapore. There was also a thriving Hokkien cultural scene that included Hokkien story-telling, opera, and media in Singapore.

After 1979, the Singapore government began to push for the use of Mandarin in Singapore, spearheaded by the Speak Mandarin Campaign. Following this, the Singapore government also began to employ a more stringent censorship, or ban, of Hokkien media in the Singaporean Chinese media. Consequently, all Hokkien-language media in Singapore had to be dubbed in Mandarin before being allowed to stream on national TV.

In addition, the 1980s saw Chinese-medium education replaced by that in English, causing English to emerge as the most widely used language in Singapore. The emergence of the English language, coupled with heavy promotion of Mandarin, generally led Hokkien to decline in Singapore after 1979.

== Current status ==
Today, the lingua franca of the Chinese community in Singapore is Mandarin. Although Hokkien is still widely spoken in Singapore today, it is not as widespread as before and is mostly restricted to the older generations. The most common places to hear Hokkien spoken in Singapore are at the country's hawker centres or kopi tiams.

Speaking ability varies amongst the different age groups of the Hokkien Singaporeans. The elderly are generally able to communicate effectively in Hokkien. On the other hand, the middle and younger generations, while generally proficient, have generally lost the ability to communicate as fluently. However, when it comes to using profanities, majority of the younger generation, even among non-Chinese Singaporeans, listed Hokkien as the first out of all languages and Chinese varieties. With the Speak Mandarin Campaign from the government, the Hokkien speaking population has been on a gradual decline.

=== Revival ===
There is, however, groups of Hokkien Singaporeans working to help preserve, spread and revive the use of Singaporean Hokkien in the country.

The ease of access to online Hokkien entertainment media and pop music from the internet has helped to connect to the language and culture. Many Singaporeans are increasingly using online and social media platforms to learn, discuss, meet, and interact with each other in Hokkien.

== Phonology ==
Note: In this article, the Tâi-lô romanization system is used.

=== Consonants ===
Initials
| | | Bilabial | Alveolar | | Alveolo- palatal | Velar | Glottal |
| | | Bilabial | plain | sibilant | Alveolo- palatal | Velar | Glottal |
|---|---|---|---|---|---|---|---|
| Nasal | | m [m] 名 (miâ) | n [n] 耐 (nāi) | | | ng [ŋ] 硬 (ngē) | |
| Plosive | plain | p [p] 邊 (pian) | t [t] 地 (tē) | ts [ts] 曾 (tsan) | tsi [tɕ] 祝 (tsiok) | k [k] 求 (kiû) | [ʔ] 音 (im) |
| Plosive | aspirated | ph [pʰ] 波 (pho) | th [tʰ] 他 (thann) | tsh [tsʰ] 出 (tshut) | tshi [tɕʰ] 手 (tshiú) | kh [kʰ] 去 (khì) | |
| Plosive | voiced | b [b] (Note: The voiced plosives /b, ɡ/ are fricatized to [β] and [ɣ] respectively in certain phonetic contexts such as during fast speech.) 文 (bûn) | d [d] (Note: Allophonically pronounced in some regional variations of Hokkien spoken in Singapore.) 日 (di̍t) | j [dz]* 熱 (jua̍h) | ji [dʑ]* 入 (ji̍p) | g [g] 牛 (gû) | |
| Fricative | | | | s [s] 衫 (sann) | si [ɕ] 心 (sim) | | h [h] 喜 (hí) |
| Approximant | | | l [l] 柳 (liú) | | | w [w] 我 (wá) | |

Finals
| | Bilabial | Alveolar | Velar | Glottal |
|---|---|---|---|---|
| Nasal consonant | -m [m] 心 (sim) | -n [n] 今 (kin) | -ng [ŋ] 興 (heng) | |
| Stop consonant | -p [p̚] 急 (kip) | -t [t̚] 越 (ua̍t) | -k [k̚] 速 (sok) | -h [ʔ] 物 (mih) |

Syllabic consonant
| | Bilabial | Velar |
|---|---|---|
| Nasal | m [m̩] 毋 (m̄) | ng [ŋ̍] 酸 (sng) |

=== Vowels ===
Monophthongs
| | Front | | Central | Back | |
| | oral | nasal | Central | oral | nasal |
|---|---|---|---|---|---|
| Close | i [i] 伊 (i) | inn [ĩ] 圓 (înn) | ir [ɨ] 豬 (tir) | u [u] 有 (ū) | unn [ũ] 羊 (iûnn) |
| Close-Mid | e [e] 會(ē) | enn [ẽ] 嬰 (enn) | | o [o] 蠔 (ô) | |
| Mid | | | er [ə] 鍋 (er) | | |
| Open-Mid | | | | oo [ɔ] 烏 (oo) | onn [ɔ̃] 嗚 (onn) |
| Open | a [a] 亞 (a) | ann [ã] 餡 (ānn) | | | |

Diphthongs & Triphthongs
| Diphthong | | | | | Triphthong |
|---|---|---|---|---|---|
| ai [ai] 愛 (ài) | ia [ia] 椰 (iâ) | io [io] 腰 (io) | ua [ua] 娃 (ua) | ui [ui] 為 (uī) | iau [iau] 枵 (iau) |
| au [au] 後 (āu) | ia [iɛ] 燕 (iàn) (Note: When ⟨ia⟩ is followed by final ⟨-n⟩ or ⟨-t⟩, it is pronounced [iɛ], with ⟨ian⟩ and ⟨iat⟩ being pronounced as [iɛn] and [iɛt̚] respectively.) | iu [iu] 油 (iû) | ue [ue] 話 (uē) | | uai [uai] 歪 (uai) |

=== Tones ===
Singaporean Hokkien tones
| Tones | Upper/Dark (陰) | | | | | | Lower/Light (陽) | | | | | |
| Tones | No. | Name | TL | e.g. | Pitch Contour | | No. | Name | TL | e.g. | Pitch Contour | |
| Tones | No. | Name | TL | e.g. | Original | Sandhied | No. | Name | TL | e.g. | Original | Sandhied |
|---|---|---|---|---|---|---|---|---|---|---|---|---|
| Level (平) | 1 | 陰平 im-piânn | a | 詩 si | [˦˦] (44) | [˨˨] (22) | 5 | 陽平 iông-piânn | â | 時 sî | [˨˦] (24) | [˨˩] (21) |
| Rising (上) | 2 | 上聲 sióng-siann | á | 死 sí | [˦˨] (42) | [˨˦] (24) | － | | | | | |
| Departing (去) | 3 | 陰去 im-khì | à | 四 sì | [˨˩] (21) | [˦˨] (42) | 7 | 陽去 iông-khì | ā | 是 sī | [˨˨] (22) | [˨˩] (21) |
| Entering (入) | 4 | 陰入 im-ji̍p | a◌ | 薛 sih | [ʔ˧˨] (32) | [ʔ˦˨] (42) | 8 | 陽入 iông-ji̍p | a̍◌ | 蝕 si̍h | [ʔ˦˧] (43) | [ʔ˨˩] (21) |
| Entering (入) | 4 | 陰入 im-ji̍p | a◌ | 薛 sih | [ʔ˧˨] (32) | [ʔ˦] (4) | 8 | 陽入 iông-ji̍p | a̍◌ | 蝕 si̍h | [ʔ˦] (4) | [ʔ˨˩] (21) |
| Note | Entering tones (4 & 8) only occur in closed syllables where ◌ represents either -p, -t, -k, or -h. | | | | | | | | | | | |

=== Variation ===
==== Regional accents and tones ====
When Singaporeans speak Hokkien, they do so with various accents and tones largely from Tong'an, Anxi, Nan'an, Kinmen as well as Yongchun, Jinjiang, Longhai City and Southern Zhangzhou accents. In practice, it is common for Singaporeans to mix English conjunctions such as "and" into a Hokkien sentence. Some would include honn (乎) (an exclamatory remark in Jinjiang / Nan'an), in addition to the widely used Hokkien exclamatory particles la (啦) or loo (囉).

==== No distinction between literary and vernacular readings ====
In saying years or numbers, Singaporean Hokkien normally does not differentiate between literary (文讀音) or vernacular (白讀音) readings of Chinese characters. In Taiwan or Amoy, a distinction is usually made. For instance, the year 1980 would be said with a literary pronunciation (一九八空年; it kiú pat khòng nî); but in Singapore, no differentiation is made and is pronounced as otherwise vernacular it káu pueh khòng nî.

As another instance, Taiwanese would speak telephone numbers using literary readings, whereas Singaporeans would use vernacular ones instead. For example, the telephone number 98444678 will be pronounced in Taiwan as kiú pat sù sù sù lio̍k tshit pat, where in Singaporean Hokkien it would be pronounced as káu pueh sì-sì sì la̍k tshit pueh.

=== Influence from Southern Zhangzhou and Teochew Phonology ===
==== Vowel shift from ing to eng ====
In Singaporean Hokkien, as compared to Quanzhou (whose accent Hokkien usually inclines toward), Zhangzhou, Amoy or Taiwanese, which pronounce the vowel ing—there is a vowel change from ing (/iŋ/ or /iəŋ/) to eng (/eŋ/ or /ɛŋ/). This change is similar to pronunciation in regions south of Zhangzhou—Dongshan, Yunxiao, Zhangpu, Pinghe, Zhao'an counties (southern Zhangzhou accent)—and in Teochew and Cantonese.

Below is a table illustrating the difference:

| Hanzi | Singaporean Hokkien | Amoy Hokkien | English |
|---|---|---|---|
| 生 | seng | sing | to live |
| 清 | tseng | tshing | clear |
| 明 | bêng | bîng | bright |
| 冷 | léng | líng | cold |
| 英 | eng | ing | brave |
| 政 | tsèng | tsìng | political |

==== Pronunciation of 'I' ====
In Amoy Hokkien pronunciation, 我 (lit. 'I/me') is pronounced as /ɡua˥˨/; but in Singapore, it is pronounced as /wa˥˨/, which is alleged by some to have been influenced by the Teochew pronunciation /ua˥˨/ although other varieties like Putianese and some regional Hokkien dialects including most Taiwanese Hokkien dialects also pronounce it as /ua˥˨/.

== Grammar ==
There are some differences between the sentence structure used by Singaporean Hokkien and by Amoy/Taiwanese Hokkien.

For instance, when asking a question "do you want to...?", Singaporean Hokkien typically uses the sentence structure 愛……莫？ (ai…mài?), whereas Taiwan uses 欲……無？ (beh…bô?). The word 愛 (ai) is commonly used in Singaporean Hokkien to mean "want to", but in Amoy Hokkien and Taiwan Hokkien, the word 欲/卜 (beh) (which means "want" in Hokkien) is used instead. 愛 (ai) in Amoy and Taiwanese Hokkien it typically means "love to" or "need to".

Also, unlike Taiwanese Hokkien—which typically uses the word 敢 (kám) (meaning "whether or not") when asking a question, which is more formal or polite—Singaporean Hokkien does not use the word 敢 (kám). Instead, it simply adds the word 無 (bô) at the end of the sentence to indicate that it is a question (similar to Mandarin's 嗎 (ma) or adds a Cantonese intonation 咩 (me1) at the end. Adding the word 無 (bô) at the end of a sentence is also used in Taiwanese Hokkien, when one is asking a question in an informal way.

Differences in sentence structure
| Singaporean Hokkien | Amoy | English |
|---|---|---|
| 愛食飯莫？ ai tsia̍h-pn̄g mài? | 欲食飯無？ beh tsia̍h-pn̄g bô? | Do you want to eat? |
| 汝有睏飽無？ lír ū khùn-pá bô? | 汝敢有睏飽？ lí kám ū khùn-pá? | Did you have enough sleep? |

== Numerals ==
The following list shows the colloquial readings of the numerals used to count objects.

| Hanzi | Tâi-lô | Value | Notes |
|---|---|---|---|
| 零, 〇 | lêng | 0 | 〇 is an informal way to represent zero also 空 (khòng) |
| 一 | tsi̍t | 1 | also pronounced it also 么 (io) when used in phone numbers etc. |
| 兩 | nn̄g | 2 | also 二 (lī/jī) |
| 三 | sann | 3 | |
| 四 | sì | 4 | |
| 五 | gō | 5 | |
| 六 | la̍k | 6 | |
| 七 | tshit | 7 | |
| 八 | pueh | 8 | |
| 九 | káu | 9 | |
| 十 | tsa̍p | 10 | |

Most ordinal numbers are formed by adding 第 (tē) in front of a cardinal number. In some cases, the literary reading of the number must then be used. For example, 第一 = tē-it, 第二 = tē-jī.

== Differences from other Hokkien varieties ==
There are minor differences between Singaporean Hokkien and Amoy or Taiwanese in terms of vocabulary, pronunciation, and grammar. Amoy and Taiwanese bear close resemblance, and are usually considered the prestige dialect of Hokkien, differing only in terms of vocabulary.

=== Unique vocabulary ===
Although Singaporean Hokkien is similar to Amoy or Taiwanese, there exist certain unique Singaporean Hokkien words, which are different from those two aforementioned dialects.

| Singaporean Hokkien | Amoy Hokkien | Definition |
|---|---|---|
| 死景 sí-kéng | 博物館 phok-bu̍t-kuán | museum |
| 活景 ua̍h-kéng | 動物園 tōng-bu̍t-hn̂g | zoo |
| 掠無球 lia̍h-bô-kiû/m̄-bat | 毋捌 m̄-bat | completely not understand (lit. catch no balls) |
| 假強 kê-khiàng | 假𠢕 ké-gâu | act smart (overdo it; Singapore especially for women) |
| 俏母 tshiò-bú | 媠查某 súi tsa-bóo | pretty lady |
| 督公 tok-kong | 讚 tsàn | superb (originated from Na Tuk Kong) |

=== Same meaning, different words ===
| Singaporean Hokkien | Definition | Amoy/Taiwanese Hokkien | Notes |
|---|---|---|---|
| 愛 ài | Want | 欲 beh | 愛 ài in Amoy means "love" or "must". 欲 in Singaporean Hokkien can be classified as an auxiliary verb denoting volition of the following verb. 欲 beh is sometimes written alternatively as 卜 beh. |
| 汝 lí / lír / lú | You | 你 lí | 你 lí (used in Quanzhou/Amoy/Taiwanese) is also used in Singaporean Hokkien, originating from Quanzhou/Amoy speech. The pronunciation of lír 汝 originated from the Tâng-uann accent (同安音), or could be traced to Teochew, while lú 汝 came from the Zhangzhou variant of Hokkien which is predominant in Penang, Malaysia as well as Medan and most parts of Indonesia. |
| 恁儂 / 恁人 lín lâng | You-all | 恁 lín | The use of 儂/人 lâng in Singaporean Hokkien pronoun (I, you, we) originated from Teochew grammar. |
| 我儂 / 我人 uá lâng | We | 阮 / 咱 gún / lán | 阮儂 gún lâng, 咱 lán and 咱儂 lán lâng are also used in Singaporean Hokkien. Quanzhou and Zhangzhou uses 阮 gún, whereas Amoy uses 阮 gún/guán in a manner similar to Taiwanese. |
| 伊儂 / 伊人 i-lâng | They | 𪜶 (亻因) in | The addition of 儂 lâng originates from Teochew, and is also commonly used in Shanghainese. |
| 錯 tshò | Wrong | 毋著 m̄-tio̍h | The Malay word salah is actually more commonly used to mean 'wrong' in Singaporean Hokkien. 毋著 m̀-tio̍h is also used in Singaporean Hokkien. |
| 舊早 kū-tsá | In the past | 頂擺 / 以前 téng-mái / í-tsêng | All variants are used in Amoy/Taiwanese. |
| 鬥跤手 tàu-kha-tshiú | Help | 鬥相共 tàu-sann-kāng | All variants are used in Amoy / Taiwanese. |
| 卽兜 tsit-tâu | This place | 這爿 / 遮 tsit-pêng / tsiâ | 這爿 tsit-pêng is also commonly used in Singapore, 遮 tsiâ less so. 這 tsit is sometimes written alternatively as 即 or 今. |
| 按呢款 án-ne-khuán | In this way, so | 按呢 án-ne/án-ni | 款 khuán is not generally appended in Amoy / Taiwanese |
| 幾鐳 / 幾箍 kui-lui / kui khoo | How much? | 偌濟錢 juā-tsuē tsînn | All variants are used in Amoy. Both 鐳 lui and 錢 tsînn are used in Minnan region today to mean "money". In Singapore however, 鐳 lui is more commonly used to mean "money". The word 鐳 lui was previously thought to have originated from Malay. However, research indicated that the word 鐳 lui is in fact a unique Hokkien word, originating from the unit of currency known as 銅鐳 tâng-lui during the early Chinese Republican period. It actually means "bronze money". 銅鐳 tâng-lui was commonly used in Minnan region and Chaoshan region during that time, and the term spread to Singapore then and remains in common use until today. 鐳 lui used to be used in Taiwan, but due to Japanese colonial rule fell out of use. It was replaced by 錢 tsînn which is the normal term for "money" in Taiwan today. |
| 轉厝 tńg-tshū | Go home | 倒去 to-khì | 轉去 to-khì is used in Singapore as well, but with a more general meaning of "going back", not specifically home. |
| 今仔日 kiann-ji̍t | Today | 今仔日 kin-á-ji̍t | Singapore '今仔'日 kiann-ji̍t is a contraction of Amoy 今仔日 kin-á-ji̍t. 今日 kin-ji̍t is also heard in Singapore. |
| 當今 tong-kim | Nowadays | 現此時 hián-tsú-sî | Both Singapore and Amoy/Taiwanese commonly use 這陣 tsit-tsūn to encompass the meaning of "nowadays". 現此時 hián-tshú-sî is commonly used in Taiwanese. |
| 即陣 tsit-tsūn | Now | 這馬 / 這站 tsit-má / tsit-tsām | 這陣 tsit-tsūn is also used in Amoy / Taiwanese |
| 四散 sì-suānn | anyhow/casual/random | 烏白 oo-pe̍h | E.g. 伊四散講 i sì-suānn kóng - He speaks casually (or nonsense). 四散 sì-suānn is sometimes also used in Amoy, and regularly used in Teochew. |
| 定著 tiānn-tio̍h | surely | 一定 / 絕對 it-tīng / tsua̍t-tùi | 定著 tiānn-tio̍h is sometimes also used in Taiwan. 一定 it-tīng is a loan from Mandarin. |
| 驚輸 kiann-su | Fear of losing out/failure - kiasu | 驚失敗 kiann sit-pāi | |
| 公私 kong-si | Share | 分 / 公家 pun / kong-ke | |
| 正 tsiā | Very | 真 tsin | |
| 傷 siong | Very tough or difficult | 艱難 / 困難 kan-lân / khùn-lân | 傷 siong literally means "injurious", but has become slang in Singapore for "tough" or "difficult" |
| 幸 heng | Luckily, fortunately | 好佳哉 hó-ka-tsài | |
| 食風 tsia̍h-hong | To go on holiday, or more generally to live in luxury | 𨑨迌 tshit-thô | In Amoy / Taiwanese, 食風 tsia̍h-hong is also used but means "facing the wind". In Singapore, 𨑨迌 tshit-thô means simply "to play" (as in children playing). |

=== Same word, different pronunciation ===
There are some words used in Singaporean Hokkien that are the same in Taiwanese Hokkien, but are pronounced differently.

| Hokkien Words | Definition | Singaporean Hokkien | Taiwanese Hokkien | Notes |
|---|---|---|---|---|
| 咖啡 | Coffee | ko-pi | ka-pi | "ko-pi" is a loan word from the Malay word "kopi" which in turn is taken from the English word "coffee" The Mandarin word "kāfēi" and the Taiwanese Hokkien word "ka-pi" are derived from the French word "café". As Hokkien does not have an f-sound, this turned into a p-sound. Philippine Hokkien pronounces the word for "coffee" as "ka-pé" which is also a loan word from the Filipino/Tagalog word "kape", which is also derived from the Spanish word "café". |
| 按怎 | How | án-tsuánn | án-nuá | "án-tsuánn" is also commonly used in Taiwan. The pronunciation of "án-nuá" originates from Zhangzhou. |
| 啥物/甚物 | What | si-mih/sim-mih | siánn-mi̍h | "si-mih/sim-mih" is based on the word 甚物 (used in Amoy/Zhangzhou), whereas "siánn-mi̍h" is based on the word 啥物 (used in Quanzhou). Taiwan typically uses "啥物 siánn-mi̍h" more often, although "甚物 sim-mih" is also used. Singapore also uses "啥物 siánn-mi̍h", though less often. |

== Influences from other languages ==
Because Singapore is a multilingual country, Singaporean Hokkien has been influenced by many other languages spoken in Singapore. As a result, there are many non-Hokkien words that have been imported into Singaporean Hokkien, such as those from Malay, Teochew, Cantonese, and English.

=== Loanwords from other Chinese varieties ===
There are words in Singaporean Hokkien that originated from other Chinese variants spoken in Singapore.

| Singaporean Hokkien | Definition | Amoy Hokkien | Notes |
|---|---|---|---|
| 偏 phinn | Cheap | 俗 sio̍k | 偏 phinn originates from Teochew. 俗 sio̍k also used in Amoy/Quanzhou/Zhangzhou |
| 死爸 sí-pē | Very | 眞 / 足 tsin / tsiok | Originated from Teochew word 死爸 sí-pĕ. Interchangeably used in Singaporean Hokkien, which can coincide with the Hokkien pronunciation of 死爸 sí-pē. The word 死爸 sí-pē in original Hokkien is a vulgar word that means "to the extent that your/my father dies". |
| 山龜 suānn-ku | Country-bumpkin | 土包仔 thóo-pau-á | Originated from Teochew, lit. "mountain tortoise" |
| 無便 bô-piàn | There is no way (nothing can be done) | 無法度 bô-huat-tō | Originated from Teochew |
| 做儛 tsò-bú | together | 做伙 / 做陣 / 鬭陣 tsuè-he / tsuè-tīn / tàu-tīn | Originated from Teochew |
| 緊張 kán-tsiong | Nervous | 緊張 kín-tiunn | Originated from Cantonese |

=== Malay loanwords ===
The following are the common Malay loanwords used in Singaporean Hokkien. Most of them are also used in Amoy.

| Singaporean Hokkien | Hanzi | Definition | Amoy Hokkien | Notes |
|---|---|---|---|---|
| Su-ka (suka) | 舒合 (su-kah) | Like | 佮意 (kah-ì) | |
| Sabun | 雪文 (sap-bûn) | Soap | 茶箍 (tê-khoo) | 雪文 (sap-bûn) is also used in Taiwan. Amoy, Quanzhou and Zhangzhou also uses 雪文 (sap-bûn). Originates from old Portuguese "sabon" (modern Portuguese uses "sabão") which also gave Malay its word for soap. 茶箍/茶枯 (tê-khoo) is also used in Amoy/Quanzhou/Zhangzhou. |
| Kah-win (kahwin) | 交寅 (kau-ín) | Marry | 結婚 (kiat-hun) | 交寅 (kau-ín) is also used in Amoy. Originates from Malay. |
| Ka-cau | | Disturb | 攪擾 (kiáu-liáu) | |
| Ba-Lu (baru) | | Recently | 最近 (tsuè-kīn) | |
| Pa-sak (pasar) | 巴刹 (pa-sat) | Market | 市場 (tshī-tiûnn) or 菜市 (tshài-tshī) | |
| Ma-ta (mata-mata) | | Police | 警察 (kéng-tshat) | Mata literally means "eye" and is used as a colloquial term for the police. 'mata-mata' may also be used to mean 'spy'. |
| Ga-duh | | Quarrel | 冤家 (uan-ke) | |
| Si-nang (senang) | | Easy | 簡單 (kán-tan) | |
| To-long | | Help | 拜託 (pài-thok)，幫忙 (pang-bâng) or 鬥相共 (tàu-sann-kāng) | |
| Sa-lah | | Offence, Wrong | 犯法 (huān-huat) | |
| Ta-pi (tetapi) | | But | 但是 (tān-sī)， 毋過 (m̄-koh/m-ku) or 猶毋過(iáu m̄-koh) | 毋過 is also used in Amoy/Quanzhou/Zhangzhou. Quanzhou typically pronounces 毋過 as "m̄-ku", whereas Zhangzhou pronounces 毋過 as "m̄-koh". |
| Roti | | Bread | 麵包 (mī-pau) or 麭 (pháng) (Japanese loanwords) | |
| Pun | 本(pun) | Also | 嘛是 (mā sī) or 也是 (iā-sī) | E.g. 伊本是眞帥 (i pun-sī tsin suí) - She is also very pretty Both other Amoy Hokkien words are also used. |
| Saman | | summons (fine) | 罰款 (hua̍t-khuán) | |
| Agak Agak | | Guess/Estimate | 臆 (ioh) | |
| Kentang | | Potato | 馬鈴薯 (má-lêng-tsû) | |
| Guli | | Marble | 大理石 (tāi-lí-tsio̍h) | |
| Botak | | Bald/Baldy | 光頭 (kng-thâu) or 禿頭 (thut-thâu) | |
| Pakat | 巴結 (pá-kat) | Conspire | 串通 (tshuàn-thong) | |
| Buaya | 磨仔 (buá à) | Crocodile | 鱷魚 (kho̍k-hî) | |
| Beh Ta-han | 袂扙捍 | Cannot tolerate | 擋袂牢 (tòng bē tiâu) | Formed by Hokkien word "beh 袂" and Malay word "tahan" |
| Mana Eh Sai | Mana 會使 | How can this be? | 敢會使 (kam ē-sái) | Formed by Malay word "mana" and Hokkien word "e-sai 會使" |
| Lokun | 老君 | Doctor | 醫生 (i-seng) | From Malay word "Dukun", which means shaman or medicine man. Alternatively, 老君 lo-kun is related to Taoist's deity Daode Tianzun, which is commonly known as Taishang Laojun (太上老君) "The Grand Supreme Elderly Lord". Many Chinese in Singapore practiced Taoism and visited Taoist temples to prescribe medicine to cure their disease. Naturally, the deity became like a doctor. Lokun 老君 can also mean a wise man. |

=== English loanwords ===
There are also many English loanwords used in Singaporean Hokkien. They are usually used when the speaker does not know the Hokkien equivalent. Some of these English terms are related to working and living in Singapore

| English loanwords in Singaporean Hokkien | Compare Taiwanese Hokkien |
|---|---|
| Shopping | 踅街 (se̍h-kue) |
| MRT | 地鐵 (tē-thih) or 捷運 (tsia̍t-ūn) |
| But | 但是 (tān-sī) or 毋過 (m̄-koh) |
| Toilet | 便所 (piān-sóo) |

== Vocabulary from Old Chinese ==
Certain colloquial pronunciations of Singaporean Hokkien words are directly inherited from the consonant system of Old Chinese. Hokkien did not experience a great phonological change throughout the transition period from Old Chinese to Middle Chinese.

Min languages, including Hokkien, preserved a unique feature of Old Chinese: it does not have labiodental consonants. For instance, the word "分" is pronounced as fen in Mandarin, but as pun in Hokkien. This marks a major difference between Old Chinese and Middle Chinese.

Old Chinese words whose usage is preserved in Singaporean Hokkien
| Hokkien Vocabulary | Mandarin Equivalent | English | Notes |
|---|---|---|---|
| 汝 lí / lír / lú | 你 nǐ | you | |
| 伊 i | 他/她/它 tā | he/she | |
| 箸 tī / tīr | 筷子 kuàizi | chopsticks | |
| 物件 mi̍h-kiānn | 東西 dōngxi | things | |
| 按呢 án-ni / án-ne | 這麼 zhème | like this | |
| 按怎 àn-tsuánn | 怎麼 zěnme | how? | |
| 厝 tshù | 房子 fángzi | house | |
| 檨 suāinn | 芒果 mángguǒ | mango | |
| 枵 iau | 餓 è | hungry | e.g. 我個腹肚眞枵。 (I'm very hungry.) |
| 尻川 kha-tshng | 屁股 pìgǔ | buttock | e.g. 拍尻川！(Spank [his] bottom!) |
| 跤 kha | 腳 jiǎo | leg | |
| 塗跤 thôo-kha | 地板 dìbǎn | floor | |
| 鼎 tiánn | 鍋 guō | wok | |
| 肉脞 bah-tshò | 碎肉 suìròu | minced meat | |
| 蹛 tuà | 住 zhù | to live/reside | e.g. 汝蹛底落？ (Where do you live?) |
| 徛 khiā | 住 zhù | to live/reside | e.g. 我徛佇牛車水。 (I live in Chinatown.) |
| 佇 tī / tīr | 在 zài | to be located in/at | e.g. 汝佇底落？ (Where are you?) |
| 暗暝 àm-mî / àm-mê | 晚上 wǎnshang | night | |
| 晏 uànn | 晚 wǎn | night | |
| 門跤口 mn̂g-kha-kháu | 門口 ménkǒu | entrance | |
| 外口 guā-kháu | 外面 wàimiàn | outside | |
| 泅水 siû-tsuí | 游泳 yóuyǒng | swim | |
| 卽陣 tsit-tsūn | 現在 xiànzài | now | |
| 卽久 tsit-kú | 現在 xiànzài | now | |
| 卽馬 tsit-má | 現在 xiànzài | now | |
| 現此時 hiān-tsú-sî | 現在 xiànzài | now | |
| 當今 tong-kim | 現在 xiànzài | nowadays | |
| 眠床 bîn-tshn̂g | 床 chuáng | bed | |
| 遘 kàu | 到 dào | get to/reach | e.g. 我遘厝了。 (I've reached home.) |
| 轉 tńg | 回去 huíqù | go back | e.g. 我轉去學堂提物件。 (I came back to get my things.) |
| 倒轉 tò-tńg | 回去 huíqù | go back | |
| 食 tsia̍h | 吃 chī | eat | |
| 猶未 á-buē | 還沒 háiméi | not yet | e.g. 我猶未食飯。 (I've not yet eaten.) |
| 趁錢 thàn-tsînn | 賺錢 zhuànqián | earn money | |

== Cultural use ==
=== In religion ===
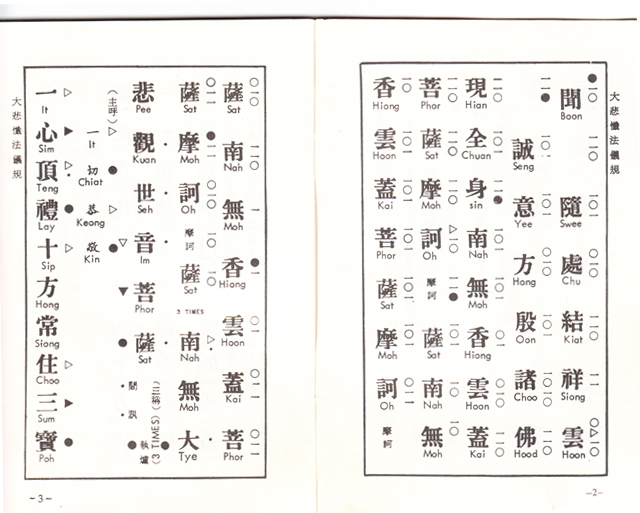
Extract from a Buddhist repentance sutra 「大悲懺法儀規」 (with Singapore-style Hokkien romanization) taken from a Buddhist temple in Singapore

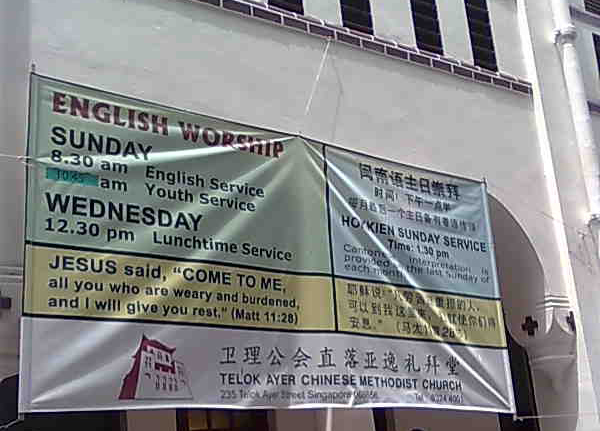
A display outside Telok Ayer Chinese Methodist Church showing Hokkien Sunday Services (on the right side)

Hokklo Taoist priests are the largest group among Taoist clergy community in Singapore, they had always conduct their religious services in Hokkien and still continue to do so. Most Tangki or Chinese mediums from Hokkien temples also communicate in Hokkien during spiritual consultation. Some of the Chinese Buddhist temples in Singapore continue to recite the Buddhist scriptures in Hokkien during their daily worship services. The scriptures contain Singapore-style Hokkien romanization are available to assist during the scriptural recitation. There are also Hokkien Buddhist sermons CDs made available and distribute among Hokkien communities in Singapore and overseas. Some of the Chinese Christian churches in Singapore also have services conducted in Singaporean Hokkien.

=== Music ===
There exist Singaporean Hokkien writings, folk adages, and ballads written by early Chinese immigrants to Singapore.

Amongst the folk ballads, a few outstanding writings tell of the history and hardship of early Chinese immigrants to Singapore.

There are 18 sections in the poetry ballad "行船歌" (Hâng-tsûn-kua) ("Songs of traveling on a boat"), which talks about how early immigrants migrated to Singapore.

There is another ballad called "砰嘭水中流" (Pin-pong-tsúi-tiong-lâu) ("Flow in the midst of water"):

乞 涸 木 爲 舟，
kih kok bo̍k ūi tsiu

砰 嘭 水 中 流，
pin pong tsúi tiong lâu

門雙 劃槳，
mn̂g-siang u̍ih-hiúnn

噝 刷 到 泉州。
si suit kàu tsuân-tsiu

An example of a folk love ballad is "雪梅思君" (Suat-m̂-su-kun) ("Snow and plum thinking of a gentlemen"), on the loyalty and chastity of love.

An example of love poetry is "針線情" (tsiam-suànn-tsiânn） ("The emotions of needle and thread"):

你 是 針， 我 是 線， 針線 永遠 黏 相 倚。
lí sī tsiam, guá sī suànn, tsiam-suànn éng-uán liâm siòng uá

人 講 針 補 針 也 著 線， 爲何 放 阮 咧 孤單。
lâng kóng tsiam póo tsiam hiam tio̍h suànn, ūi-hô pàng gún leh koo-tuann

啊！ 你 我 本 是 同 被單， 怎樣 來 拆散？
Ah, lí guá pún sī tâng phuē-tuann, tsuánn-iūnn lâi thiah-suànn

有 針 無 爲 叫 阮 要 按怎， 思念 心情 無帶 看。
ū tsiam bô suànn kiò gún ài an-tsuánn, su-liām sim-tsiânn bô-tè khuànn

=== Getai ===
Singapore also held Getai during traditional Chinese festivals, for instance the Zhong Yuan Festival. During the Getai event, it is common to speak a number of Chinese varieties, including Hokkien, Teochew, and Cantonese. During the 1960s, Hokkien song was particularly popular. The Singapore Hokkien star Chen Jin Lang (陳金浪) was once the compere and main singer during the Hungry Ghost Festival. His famous song "10 levels of Hades" ("十殿閻君") was especially popular.

=== In opera ===
Early Singaporean Hokkien opera had its origins in Gaojia opera, which was brought from Quanzhou to Singapore during the late 19th century. In 1927, the Taiwanese Gezai opera spread to Singapore. Because its lyrics and singing style were easier to understand, it made a great impact on Singapore. Consequently, by the mid 20th century, it had replaced Gaojia opera to become the mainstream Hokkien opera in Singapore.

Currently, Singapore Hokkien opera is performed by two older troupes—Sin Sai Hong Hokkien Opera Troupe (新賽風閩劇團) and Xiao Kee Lin Hokkien Opera Troupe (筱麒麟閩劇團)—and three newer troupes—Sio Gek Leng Hokkien Opera Troupe (筱玉隆閩劇團), Ai Xin Hokkien Opera Troupe (愛心歌仔戲團), and Do Opera [Hokkien] (延戲[福建歌仔戲]), which is the newest.

A Singapore Chinese opera school nurtures talents in opera, including Hokkien opera.

=== In movies ===
Singaporean movies that heavily use Hokkien began to appear in the late 1990s, notably by dubbing in Hokkien mainstream Chinese movies made in Singapore. Amongst these, local movies such as I Not Stupid, I Not Stupid Too, Singapore Dreaming and Money No Enough were popular. These movies often reflected the social environment of local Singaporeans.

=== In radio ===
Although Singapore radios started to ban Hokkien in the 1980s, Rediffusion Singapore continued to broadcast in Hokkien and greatly contributed to the culture of Singapore. For instance, the Hokkien story-telling program Amoy folks story (廈語民間故事), by Koh Sock May (許淑梅), was very popular.

=== Nanyin ===
Nanyin (Southern Music) first spread to Singapore in 1901. Many immigrants from Quanzhou began to establish various Nanyin organizations.

Those which survive include the Siong Leng Musical Association, which was established in 1941. It was responsible for promoting Nanyin, as well as Liyuan opera. In 1977, the then chairman of the association, Ting Ma Cheng (丁馬成), advocated for the ASEAN Nanyin Performance (亞細安南樂大會奏), which helped to revive Nanyin. In addition, in order to educate young people about this performance art, he also published two books on Nanyin and Liyuan opera.

Currently, the Siong Leng Musical Association is led by Ding Honghai (丁宏海), and it continues to promote Nanyin in Singapore.

== Footprints of Pe̍h-ōe-jī ==
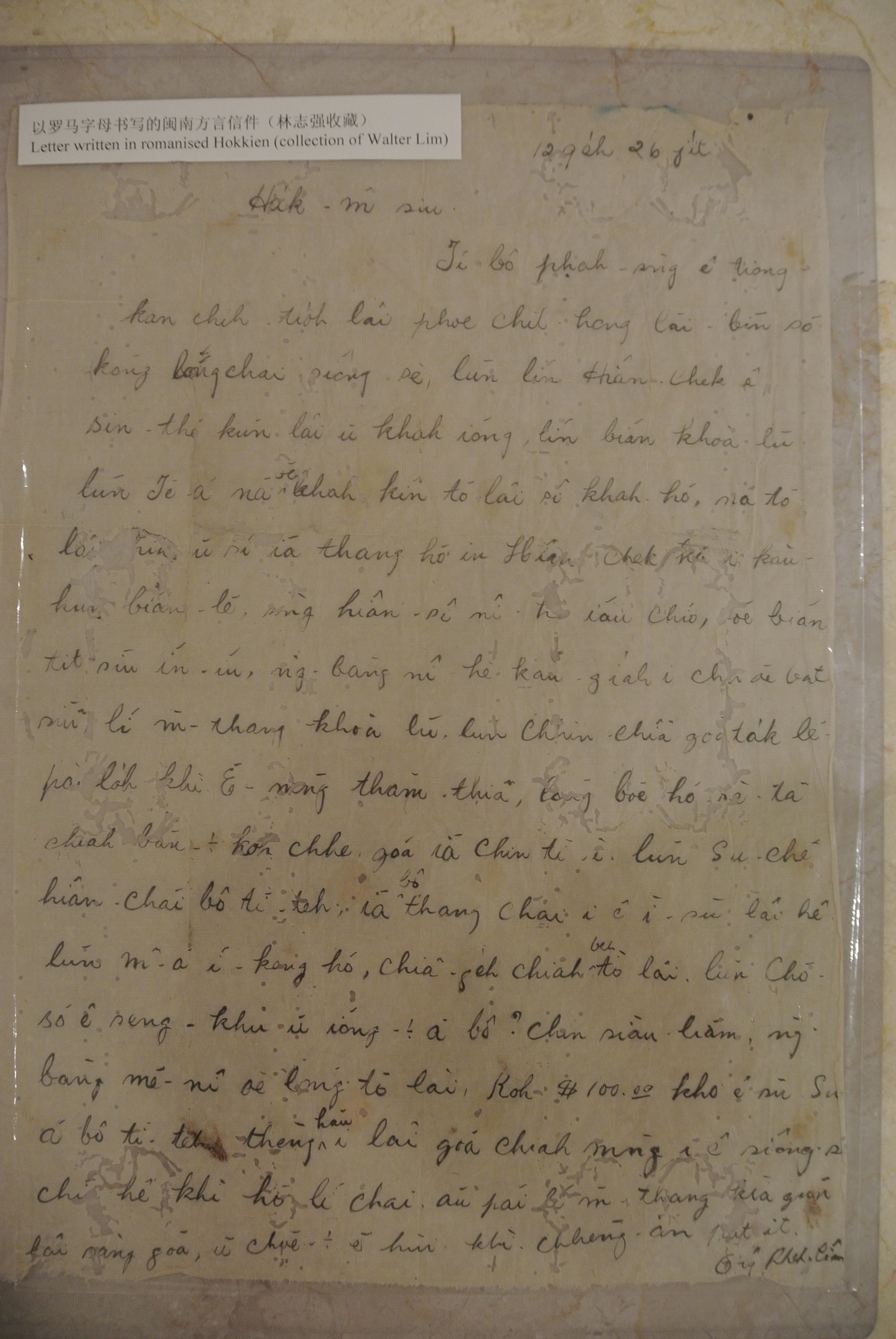
Provided by descendant of Tan Boon Hak, 陳文學, a cousin of Tan Kah Kee, who donated it to the Brownies for the exhibition

There are some letters written in Pe̍h-ōe-jī from early Hokkien migrants in Singapore.

An example was provided by the descendant of Tan Boon Hak (陳文學; Tân Bûn-ha̍k), a cousin of Tan Kah Kee (陳嘉庚; Tân Ka-kiⁿ).

| POJ Letter (in romanized Hokkien) | Hàn-jī transcription |
|---|---|
| 12 ge̍h 26 ji̍t Ha̍k-ḿ siu Tī bô phah-sǹg ê tiong-kan chih-tio̍h lâi phoe chit hong, lāi-bīn só kóng long chai siông-sè, lūn lín Hiân-chek ê sin-khu, kūn lāi ū khah ióng, lín bián khoà-lū, lūn jī á nā-sī khah kín tò-lâi pó khah hó. Nā tò-lâi chia, ū sî iā thang hō͘ in hiân-chek khah I kàu-hùn, bián-lē. sǹg hiân-sî nî-hè iáu chió, bē bián tit-siū ín-iń, ng-bāng nî-hè kàu gia̍h i chiū ē bat siūⁿ . lí m̄-thang khoà-lū. lūn chhin-chiâⁿ goá ta̍k lé-pài lo̍h khì Ē-Mn̄g thām thiā, long boē hó-sè. Tā-chiah chia bān-bān koh chhōe, goá iā chin tì-ì . lūn su-chē hiân-chai bô tī the, iā thang chai ié ī-sū. Lái heⁿ lun̄ mā ái kóng hó, chiaⁿ-ge̍h chiah beh tò-lâi. Lūn chō sō ê seng-khu ū ióng-ióng á-bô. Chin siàu-liân ǹg-bāng mê-nî ē long tò-lâi, koh $100.00 kho ě sū. Su á-bô ti-teh thēng hāu-lâi, góa chiah mn̄g I ê siông-sè, chit ê kì-hō, lí chai āu-pái m̄-thang kià kòe lâi sàng góa, ū chōe chōe êhùi khì. Chhéng an put it. Ông pheh lîm | 12月26日 學姆 收 佇無拍算的中間，接著來批一封，內面所講攏知詳細。論恁賢叔的身軀，近來有較勇，恁免掛慮。論兒仔若是較緊倒来保較好，若倒來遮，有時也通予(亻因) 賢叔共伊教訓、勉勵。算現時年歲猶少，袂免得受引誘，向望年歲夠額 伊就會捌想，汝毋通掛慮。論親情，我逐禮拜落去廈門探聽，攏袂好勢，踮遮則慢慢閣揣，我也真致意。論師姐現在無佇咧，也無通知伊的意思，來衡論嘛愛講好，正月才欲倒來。論做嫂用身軀有勇勇抑無？真少年，向望明年會攏倒來，閣$100.00箍的事。師也無佇咧，聽後來，我才問伊的詳細，這個記號，汝知後擺汝毋通寄過來送我，有濟濟的費氣。請安不一。 王帕林 |

== Places in Singapore ==
Singapore's Chinese name (新加坡; Sin-ka-pho) comes from the Hokkien transliteration of "Singapore". Many other place names in Singapore also have origins in Hokkien, often mixed with Malay. For example, Ang Mo Kio (红毛桥; 紅毛橋; Âng-mô͘-kiô) means "red-haired man's bridge", Toa Payoh (大巴窑; 大巴窯; Tōa Pa-iô) combines Hokkien tōa, meaning "big", with pa-iô, derived from Malay paya, meaning "swamp", and Tiong Bahru (中峇鲁; 中峇魯; Tiong-bā-lú) comes from Hokkien 塚; thióng, meaning cemetery, and Hokkien or Teochew bā-lú, from Malay bahru, meaning "new". The transcription using Hokkien 中, tiong, meaning "middle" is a near-homophone but ultimately inaccurate. The neighbourhood of Teck Ghee, including its MRT station, is also derived from Hokkien.

== See also ==
- Hoklo people
- Hokkien culture
- Hokkien architecture
- Written Hokkien
- Hokkien media
- Holopedia
- Hokkien influence on Singaporean Mandarin
- Speak Hokkien Campaign
- Singaporean Mandarin
