= Hokkien culture =

Culture of China

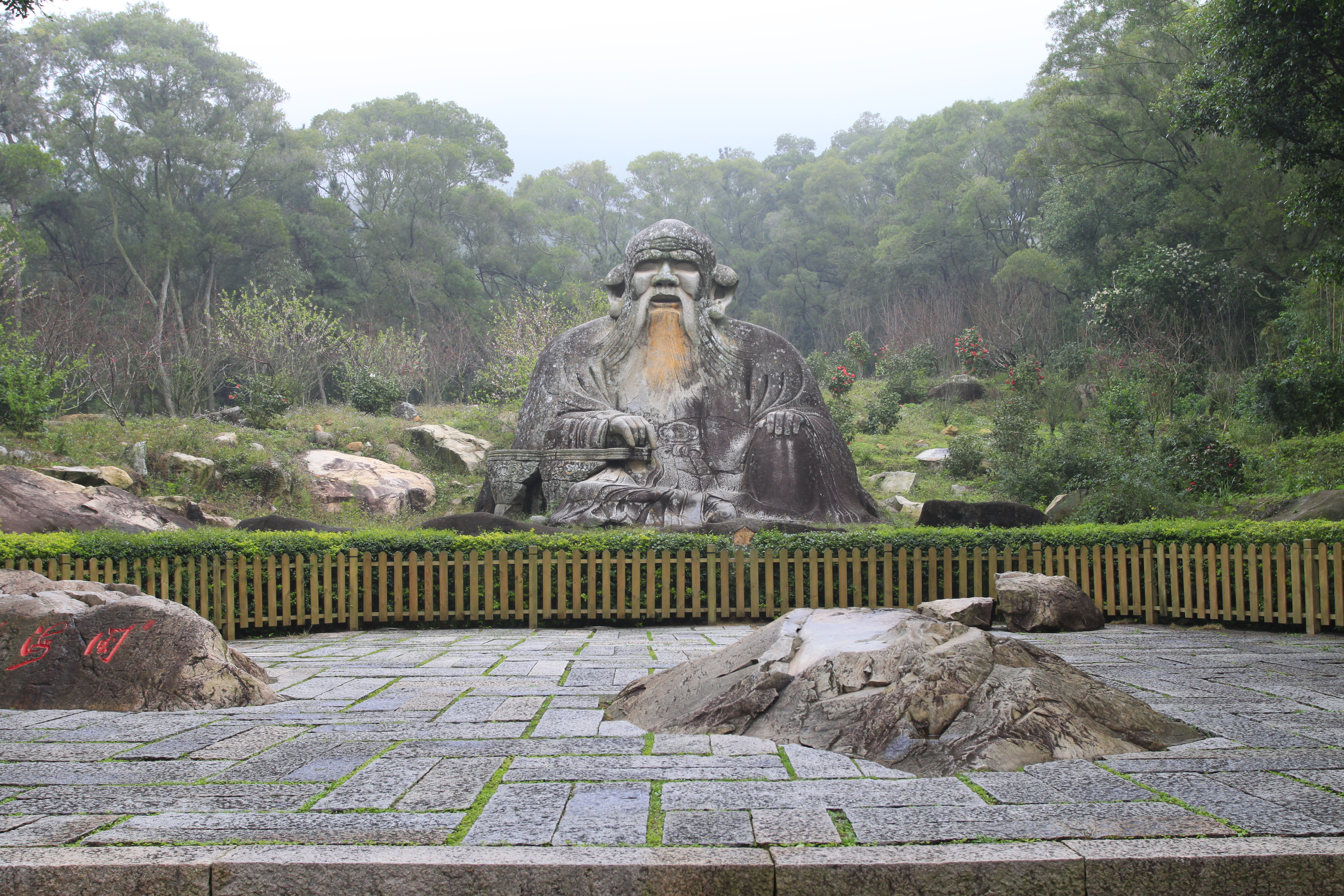
Stone Statue of Laozi ("Ló-tsú" in Hoklo language) at Mount Qingyuan in Quanzhou, Fujian, China.

Hokkien culture is the culture of the Hokkien people, a group of Han Chinese people who have historically been the dominant demographic in the southern part of the province of Fujian (called "Hokkien" in the Hokkien language), as well as in Taiwan and certain overseas Chinese communities in Southeast Asia, such as Singapore, Malaysia, the Philippines, Indonesia, Myanmar, Southern Thailand, Cambodia, and Southern Vietnam.

This culture has been influenced by the cultures from Minyue (a branch of Baiyue people who inhabited Hokkien before sinicization of the region), China's Central Plain (most notably during the Tang dynasty and Song dynasty), and Japan (due to Taiwan being a former Japanese colony). It encompasses the Hoklo language and its associated architecture, folk arts, cuisines, and large amount of folklore. Since 17th century, Hokkien culture has spread with Hoklo immigration to Taiwan, Singapore, Malaysia, the Philippines, Indonesia, Myanmar, Southern Thailand, Cambodia, Southern Vietnam, etc. Its influence today can be seen in Taiwanese pop culture, resulting in it becoming an influential cultural force in Taiwan, Southern Fujian, Singapore, Malaysia, the Philippines, Indonesia, Myanmar, Southern Thailand, Cambodia, Southern Vietnam, etc.

The province of Fujian itself shows considerable linguistic and cultural diversity – Min Chinese languages, spoken across Fujian, have several dialects that have at best limited mutual intelligibility with one another. The focus of this article is on the culture of southern Fujian (around the cities of Amoy and the two cities named Chinchew), the area where the Southern Min/Hoklo language is spoken, and also by far the most populous part of Fujian.

== Native language ==
Southern Min (Chinese: 閩南語; Pe̍h-ōe-jī: Bân-lâm-gú), also called the Hokkien language, Hoklo language, Hokkien-Taiwanese or Min-Nan, belongs to the Min Chinese subgroup of the Chinese language family and is an isolating language. It is the product of the language spoken by the original Minyue people and that of the later arriving Han Chinese. A large number of Han Chinese people migrated to Southern Fujian between the 7th and 13th century from Northern China, which was then invaded by various non-Han ethnic groups such as the Mongols, and intermixed with Minyue people. The intermixing is reflected by the fact that:

1. Modern-day Hoklo people are, genetically, the hybrid descendants of Minyue and Ancient Han Chinese;
2. And that the modern Hokkien language shows traits of both the Minyue language and Old Chinese.

Due to the historic migration of Hoklo people to Taiwan and Southeast Asia, the Hokkien language has spread far beyond its traditional homeland of Southern Fukian. In each of these areas, local forms of Hokkien can be found and show influences from nearby languages. Taiwanese Southern Min, for instance, has been influenced by Japanese and Formosan languages (languages spoken by Taiwanese aboriginals), while Singaporean Hokkien contains many loanwords from Malay and English. Philippine Hokkien on the other hand, showcases a few loanwords from Spanish or Filipino and is regularly code-switched with English, Filipino/Tagalog, and/or Visayan languages, as well as other Philippine languages. These various forms of Hokkien are, however, still similar enough to be largely mutually intelligible with one another.

=== Writing system ===
"Free Encyclopedia" written using Koa-á books' writing system

In terms of writing systems, Hokkien gained one as early as the first half of the 16th century (Ming dynasty)—with the play Tale of the Lychee Mirror (Chinese: 荔鏡記; Pe̍h-ōe-jī: Nāi-kèng-kì), which is fairly popular among the Hoklo people even to this day. Later in the 18th century, Koa-á books, a form of vernacular Hokkien literature, gained popularity and attempted to use Chinese characters to write the Hokkien language. Written Hokkien saw further development in 19th century. At that period, Presbyterian Christians sought to spread Presbyterianism in the Hokkien region and devised the "Pe̍h-ōe-jī"—a Hokkien writing system that uses the Latin alphabet—in Amoy (known as "Xiamen" in Mandarin).

Japan, while colonizing Taiwan, also developed the Taiwanese kana writing system.

== Architecture ==
The traditional architectural style of Hoklo people is largely similar to those of surrounding Han Chinese groups. There are, however, several features that are unique or mostly unique to Hoklo-made buildings, making many traditional buildings in Hokkien and Taiwan visually distinctive from those outside the region. Traditional Hokkien architecture has been noted for: (1) Swallowtail roof (Pe̍h-ōe-jī: ìnn-bé-tsiah; Traditional Chinese: 燕尾脊, literally "swallowtail ridge"), which refers to a roof that has an upward-curving ridge shaped like the tail of a swallow. The degree of curving may vary. The "swallowtail" in question can be single- or double-layered and is typically decorated with a large amount of colorful carvings; (2) Cut porcelain carving (Chinese: 剪瓷雕; Pe̍h-ōe-jī: Tsián-huî-tiau), which is seen also in Vietnamese architecture—Traditionally, Hoklo porcelain artists gather small, colored porcelain artifacts, cut and grind them into small fragments, and then paste these fragments onto sculptures attached to buildings. This art is frequently used on the ridges, window frames, and doors of temples and larger residence, often together with swallowtail roof.

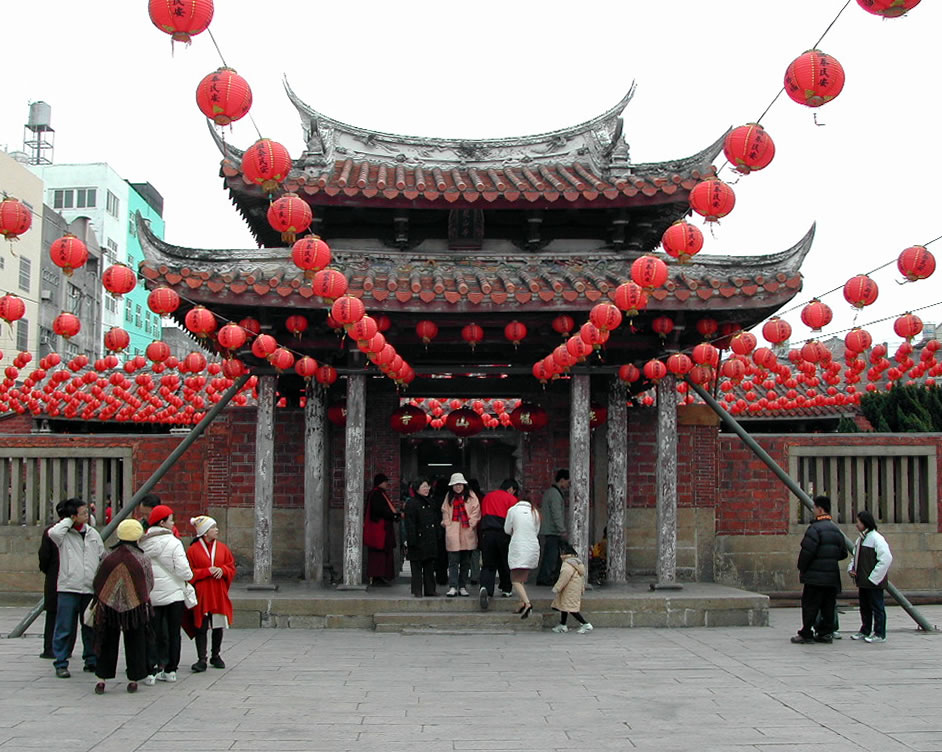
Typical Hoklo architecture styled Lukang Longshan Temple in Lukang city.

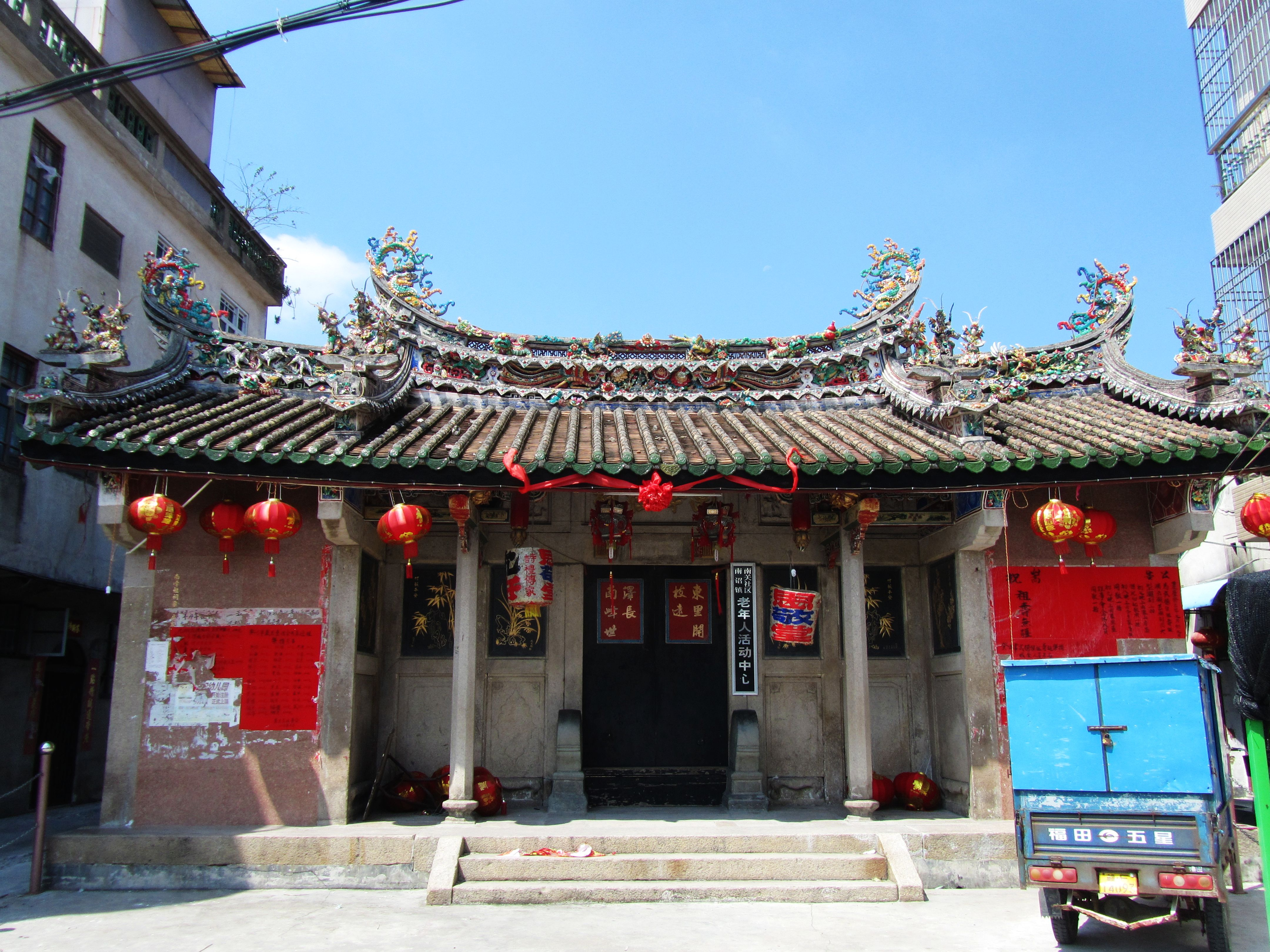
Nanfeng Ancestral Temple at Chiàu-an, Changchow, Hokkien.

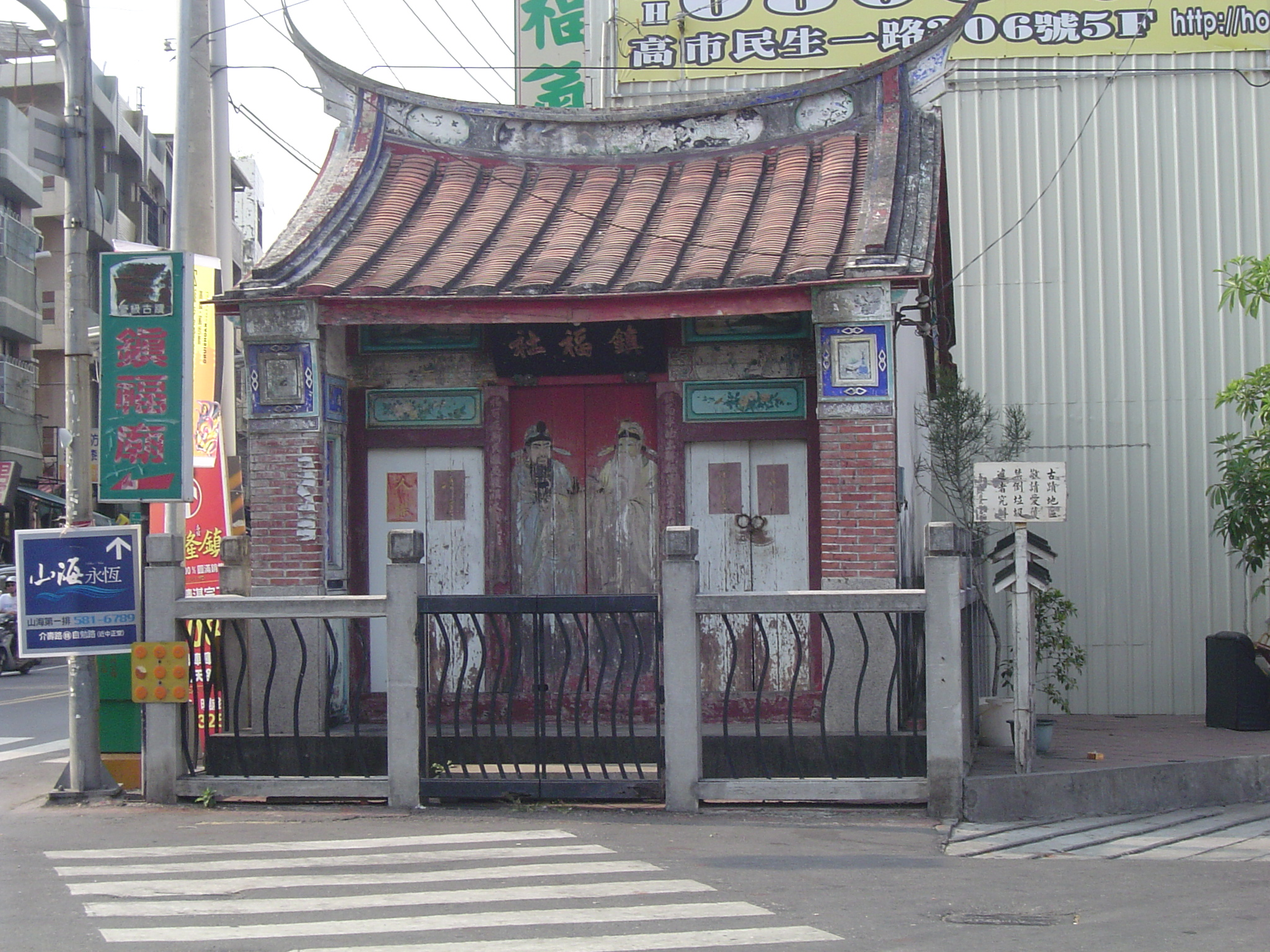
A shrine for Tudigong, a Taoist earth deity, in Kaohsiung, Taiwan; It is an example of a less garish swallowtail roof.

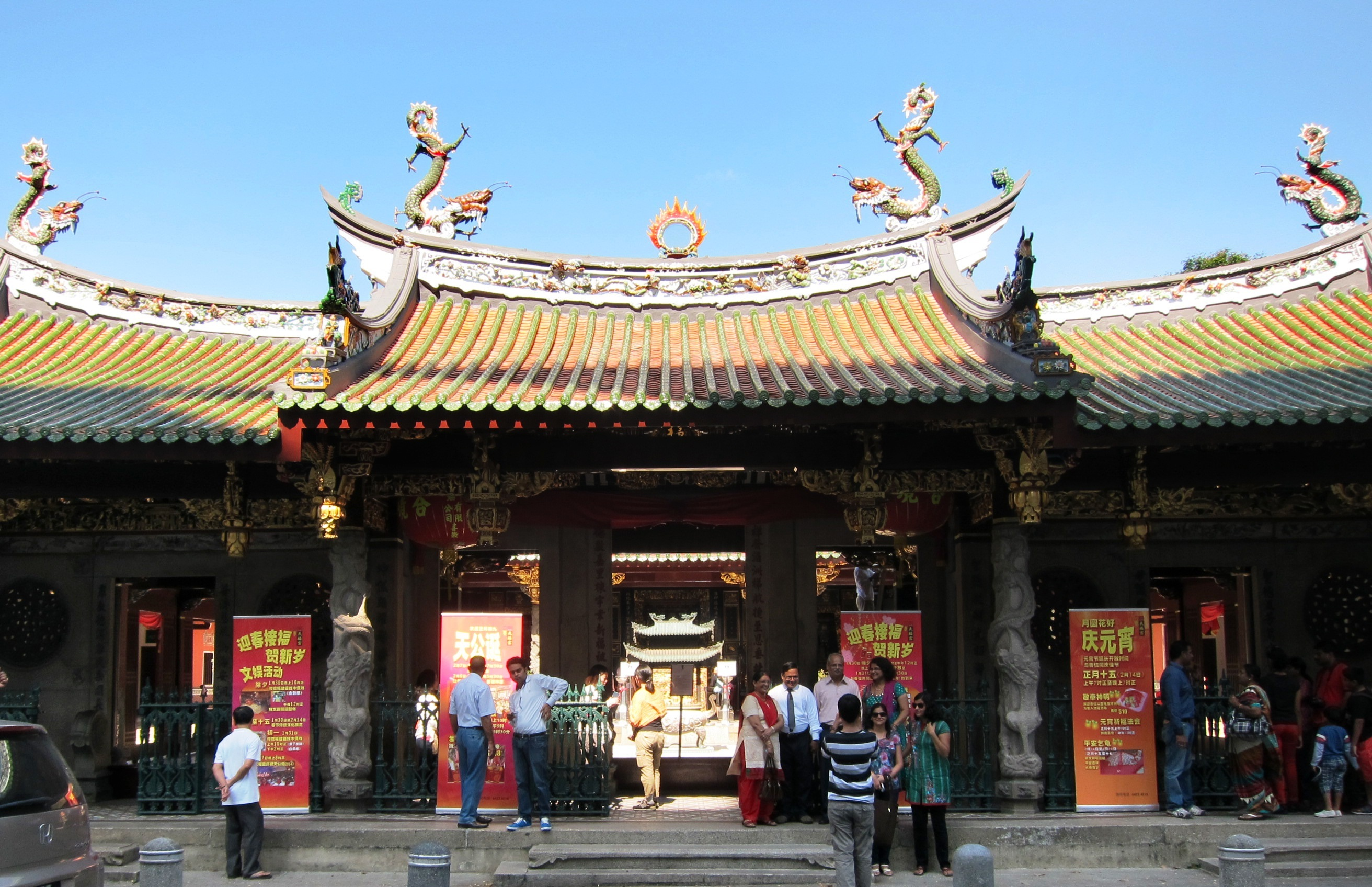
Front entrance of Thian Hock Keng Temple, Singapore.

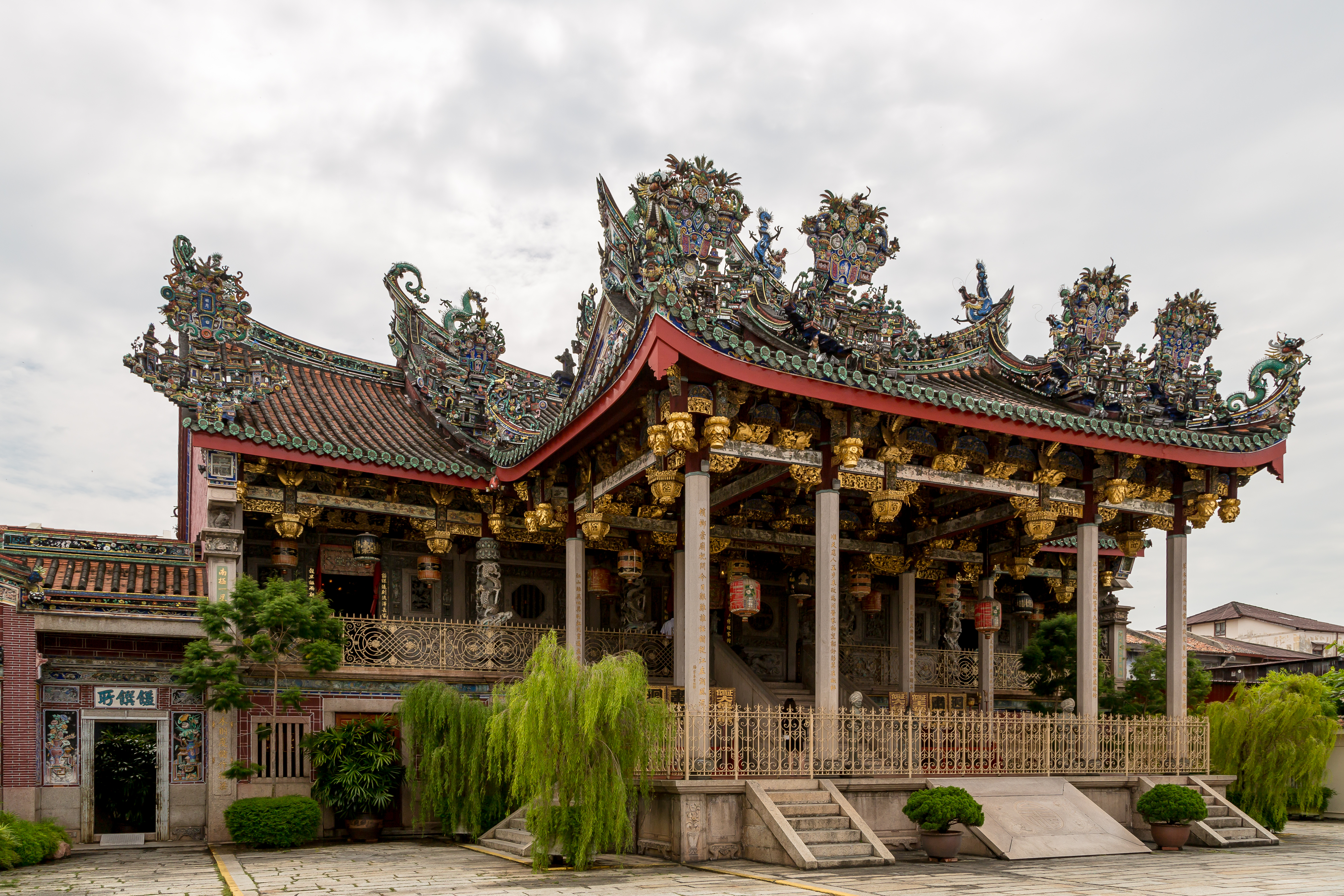
Khoo Kongsi in Penang, Malaysia.

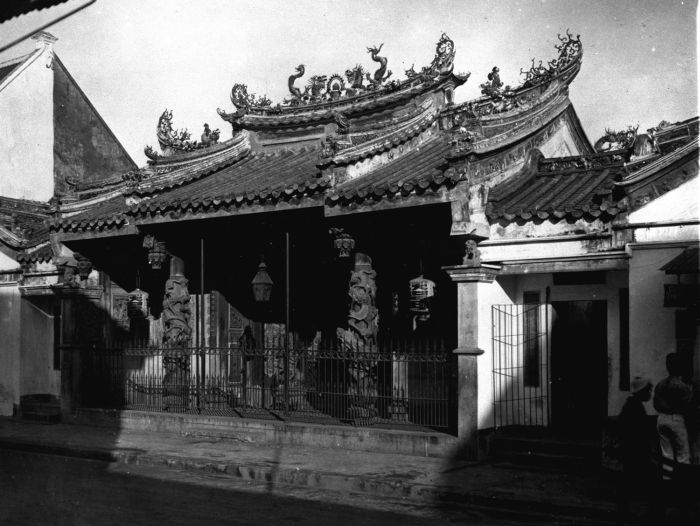
Historical image of a Mazu Temple in Makassar, Sulawesi, Indonesia. The building was burned in 1997 during anti-Chinese riot in the city. The temple was being rebuilt and renamed as Vihara Ibu Agung Bahari.

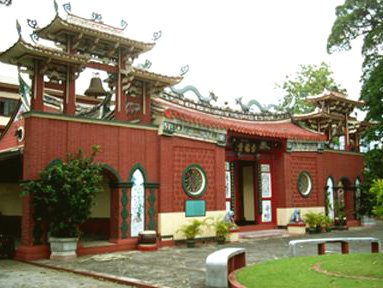
Chong Hock Tong Temple at the Manila Chinese Cemetery in Manila, Philippines

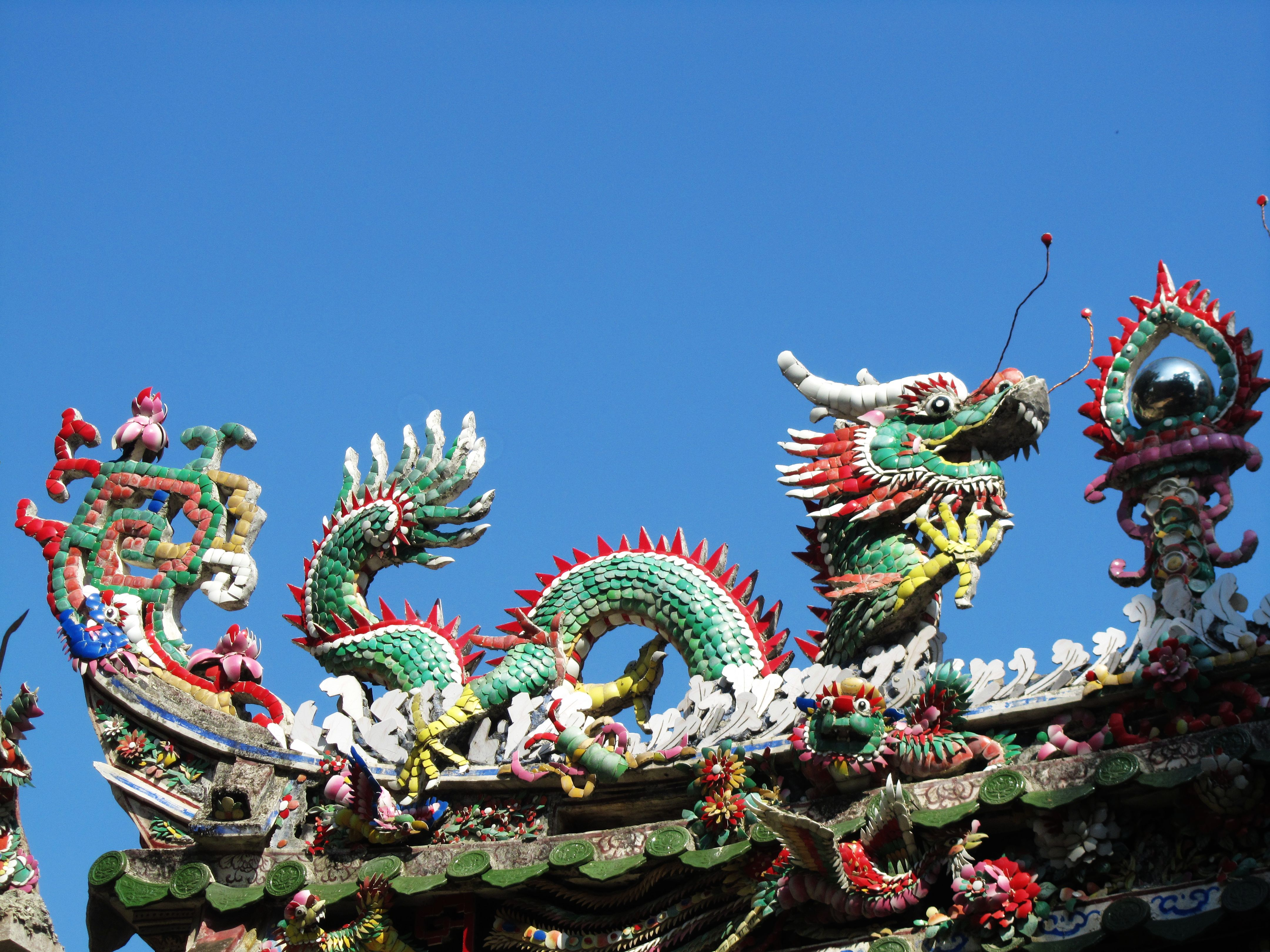
A Chinese dragon sculpture on the roof of Amoy Memorial Temple of Lord Guan, Amoy, Hokkien; It is an example of cut porcelain carvings.

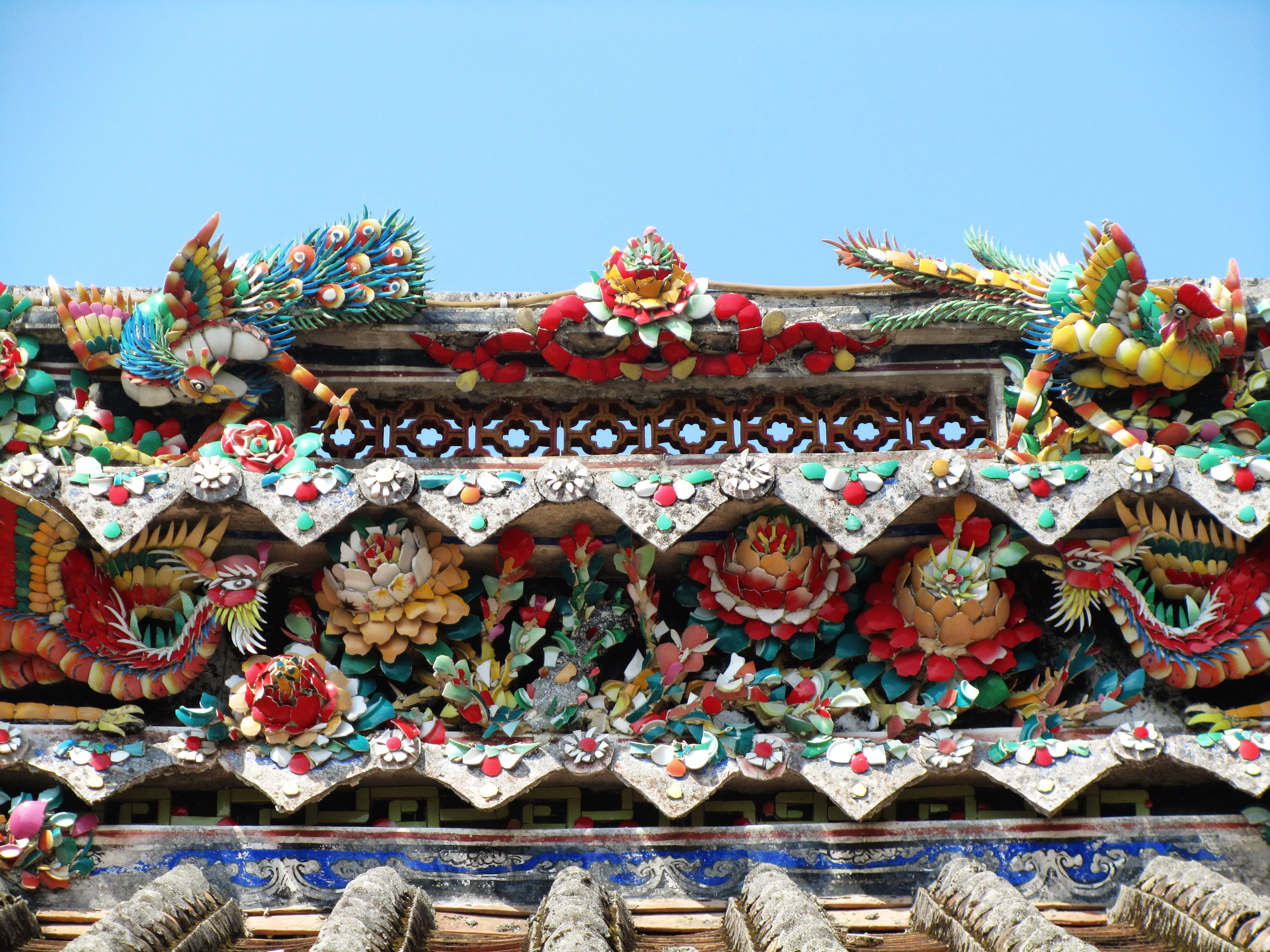
Cut porcelain carving decorations above the main door of Nanfeng Ancestral Temple.

=== Têng-á-kha ===
Têng-á-kha (Chinese: 亭仔跤; Pe̍h-ōe-jī: Têng-á-kha) is a style of architecture found in much of Southern China and roughly the Hokkien counterpart of Cantonese tong lau. It is a style that incorporates elements from Western European architecture, arising slowly in late 18th century due to the contact with Western European colonization in Southeast Asia. A typical têng-á-kha has a ground floor used for running some sort of business (such as a grocery store) and upper floors that are used for residential purpose. Amoy's têng-á-khas are said to be marked by having pink and white as main colorings, use of streets full of têng-á-khas as markets, and distribution of têng-á-khas in net-like structures. The city of Chinchew has also been noted to have a well-preserved set of têng-á-khas.

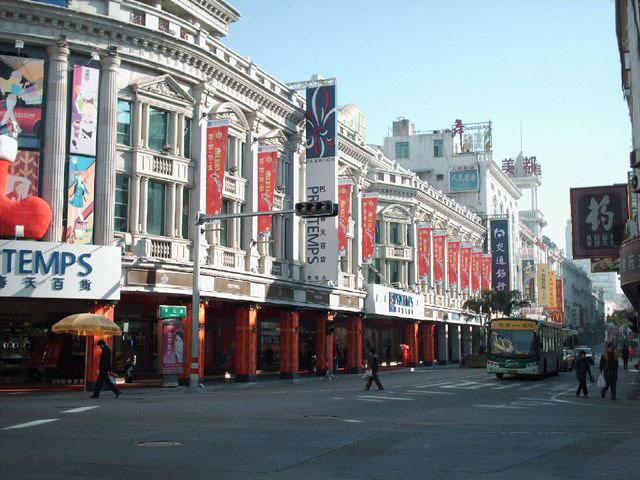
Zhongshan Road, Amoy, is filled with têng-á-khas.

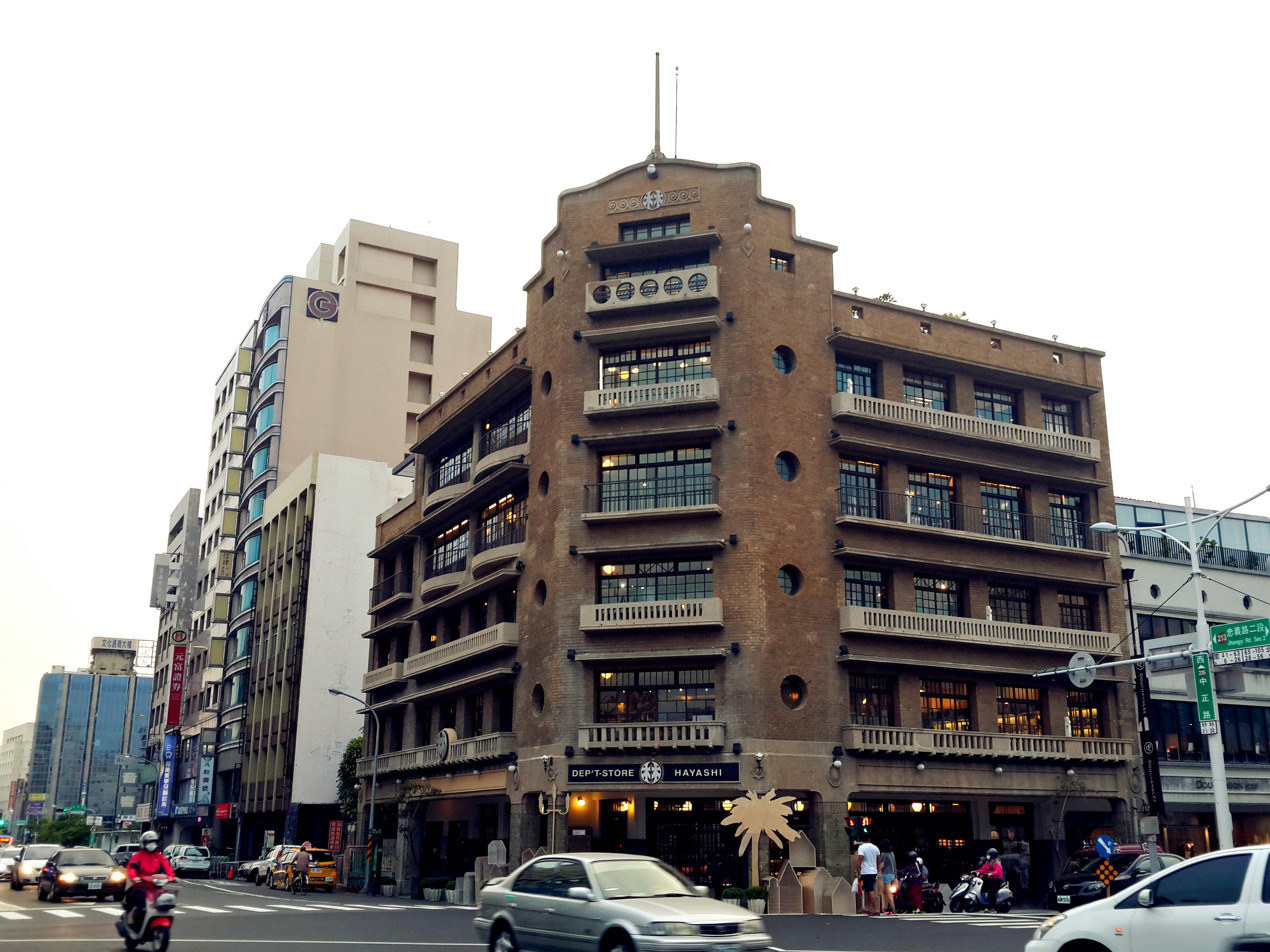
The Hayasi Department Store in Tainan, Taiwan, is also considered a good example of têng-á-kha.

== Visual arts ==
=== Hua'an jade ===
Hua'an jade (Pe̍h-ōe-jī: Hua-an gi̍k; Traditional Chinese: 華安玉) is a type of hornfels with green bands consisting of epidote and diopside, known to be found primarily in Hokkien, China. It is noted for being dense, resistant to wearing, and having very irregular coloring and texture. This type of jade is frequently used in jewellery and carvings made in Hokkien.

=== Tek-hòe porcelain ===
Tek-hòe porcelain (Pe̍h-ōe-jī: Tek-hòe hûi; Traditional Chinese: 德化陶瓷) is a type of white porcelain that originated from the city of Tek-hòa (called "Dehua" in Mandarin Chinese), Hokkien. This style of porcelain began in the 14th to 15th century (Ming dynasty), and, according to some sources, perhaps even earlier than that. This style is noted for using Kaolinite to create very detailed and delicate porcelains, and also for the products' pure, ivory-like white coloring and resemblance to archaic ritual objects. With the Hokkien coast being a major ceramic exporting center at that time, Tek-hòe porcelain products have been sold to Western European merchants and given the name "Blanc de Chine" (literally "White of China") by the French. Even in the 21st century, Hoklo people are still keeping the tradition of making Tek-hòe porcelain alive, and this style is used in many types of products, ranging from purely artistic ones (e.g., sculptures) to more practical ones (e.g., eating utensils).

==== Gallery ====
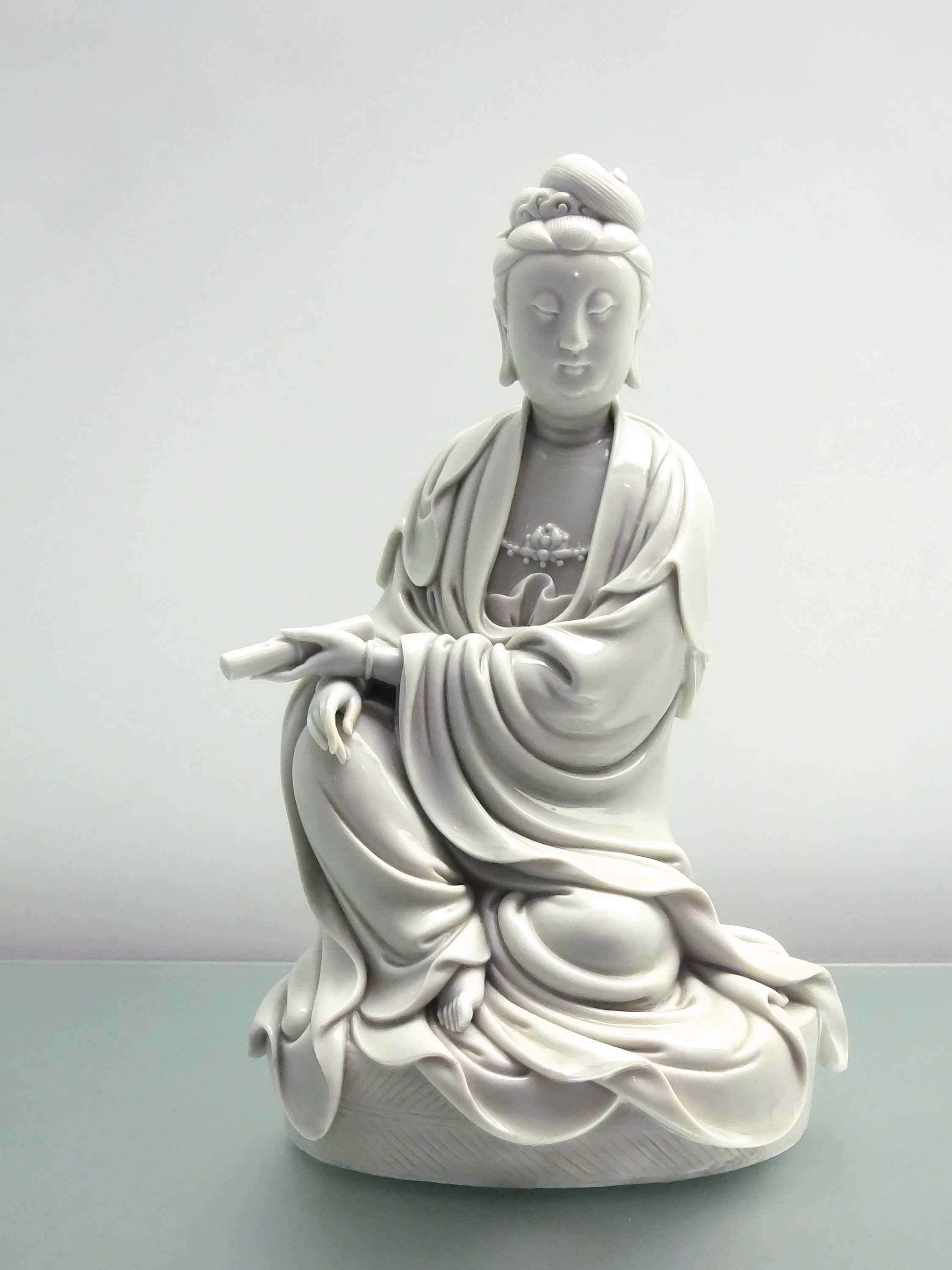
A Tek-hòe porcelain sculpture of a sitting Guanyin (17th century)

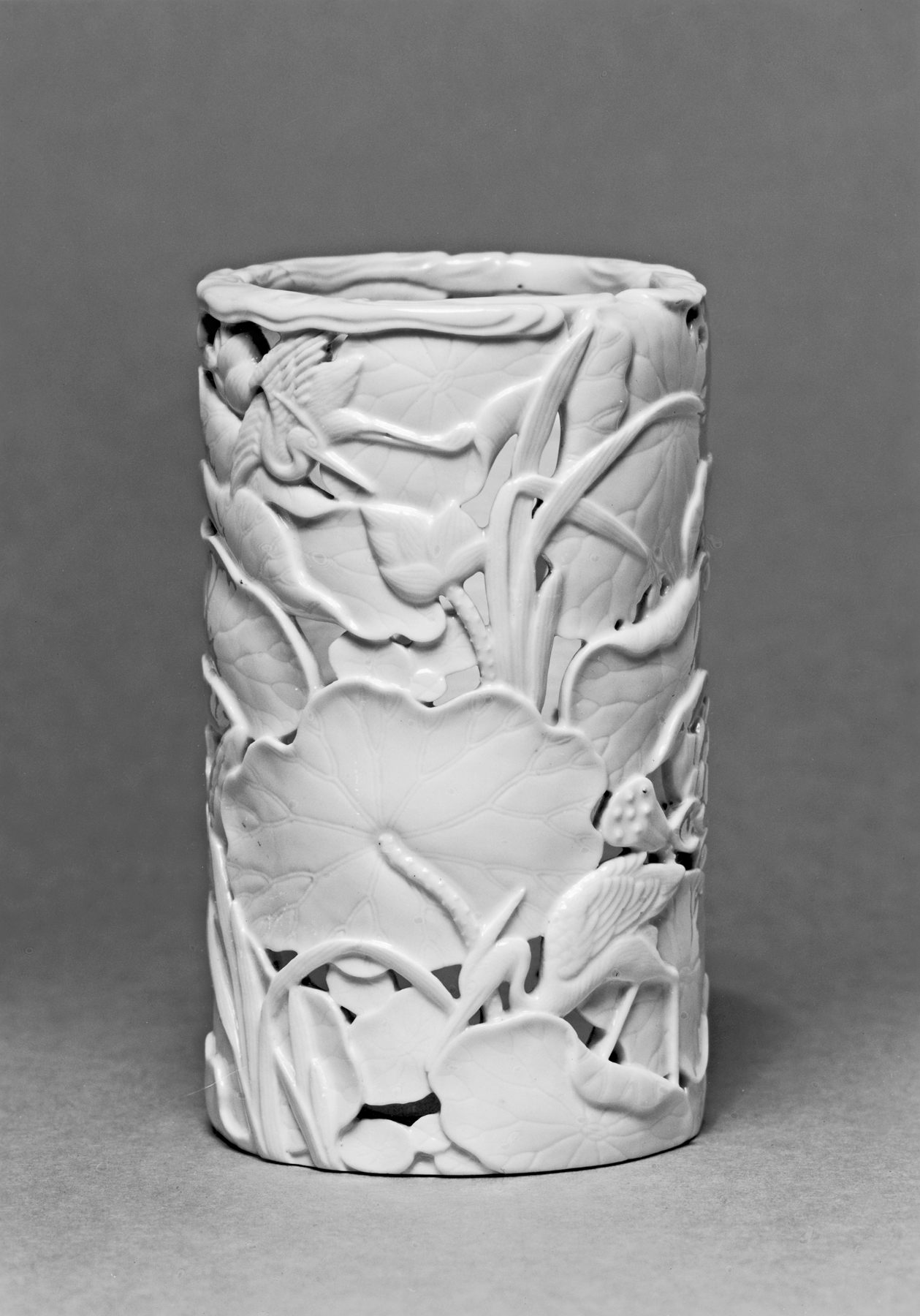
A Tek-hòe porcelain brush holder (late 17th-18th century)

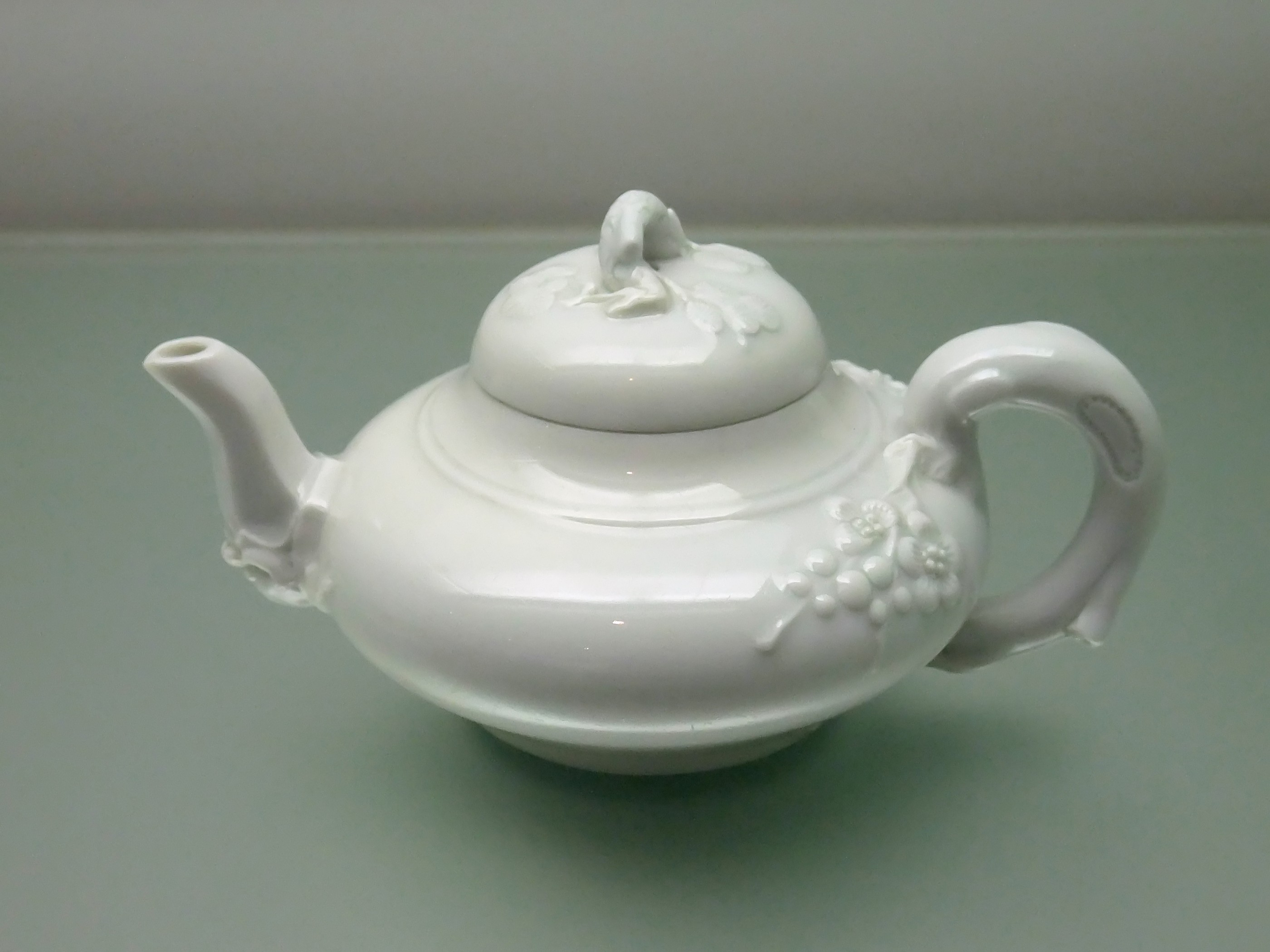
A Tek-hòe porcelain teapot (17th to 18th century)

=== Minnan style of calligraphy ===
Hoklo people have also used a considerable amount of calligraphy as decorations for their traditional buildings. The potential of Minnan style of calligraphy (Pe̍h-ōe-jī: Bân-lâm su-hong; Traditional Chinese: 閩南書風) has come under the attention of Chinese cultural scholars in late 2000s. Deeper studies are being conducted on the traditional calligraphy of Hokkien.

=== Lacquer thread sculpture ===
Lacquer thread sculpture (Pe̍h-ōe-jī: Tshat-suànn tiau; Traditional Chinese: 漆線雕, literally "painted wire carving"), sometimes translated as "paint line carving" in English, is a traditional folk art in Hokkien, having originated in Amoy before 18th century. This folk art involves wrapping fine, usually golden filigree-like threads around other artifacts to form images of characters and animals. It is most typically used on Buddhist statues and vases for the purpose of decoration. It was traditionally passed only to male heirs but is now passed to Hoklo of either gender. As of 2006, it has formally been declared an intangible cultural heritage by China.

A video of the process of making lacquer thread sculpture (in Mandarin) is available on YouTube.

=== Minnan school of painting ===
Minnan school of painting (Pe̍h-ōe-jī: Bân-lâm uē-phài; Traditional Chinese: 閩南畫派) is a school of painting invented by Hoklo people in Hokkien. It was invented in mid-20th century by a group of Hoklo painters in Chinchew, Hokkien. This style was characterized by a strong urge to break conventions in traditional Han Chinese paintings and adoption of modern European artistic ideals. It has been influenced by impressionism, fauvism, and cubism, but retained many techniques used in traditional Han Chinese paintings. Despite being rather obscure outside Hokkien, it has seen an increase in popularity among Hoklo in early 21st century.

== Performing arts ==
Hoklo have historically been prolific producers of music and operas, most of which are sung and expressed using the Hokkien language. Music and opera types that originated in or are associated with the Hokkien-speaking region include:

- Lâm-kóan music (Pe̍h-ōe-jī: Lâm-kóan; Traditional Chinese: 南管, literally "southern pipes");
- Pak-kóan music (Pe̍h-ōe-jī: Pak-kóan; Traditional Chinese: 北管, literally "northern pipes");
- Phô͘-sian opera (Pe̍h-ōe-jī: Phô͘-sian-hì; Traditional Chinese: 莆仙戲, literally "opera of Phô͘-sian");
- Lê-hn̂g opera (Pe̍h-ōe-jī: Lê-hn̂g-hì; Traditional Chinese: 梨園戲, literally "pear garden opera");
- Ko-kah opera (Pe̍h-ōe-jī: Ko-kah-hì / Kau-kah-hì; Traditional Chinese: 高甲戲, literally "tall-armor opera");
- Tap-chhùi-kó͘ (Pe̍h-ōe-jī: Tap-chhùi-kó͘; Traditional Chinese: 答嘴鼓, literally "replying and drum");
- Taiwanese opera (Pe̍h-ōe-jī: Koa-á-hì; Traditional Chinese: 歌仔戲, literally "song-opera");
- Hokkien pop (Pop music produced mainly in Taiwan and in the Hokkien language);

=== Glove puppetry ===
Glove puppetry (Pe̍h-ōe-jī: Pò͘-tē-hì; Traditional Chinese: 布袋戲, literally "cloth bag opera") is by far the best-known opera form of Hokkien origin. It originated in Hokkien in around 17th century, and is a form of opera that uses cloth puppets and music to tell stories. Puppets used in glove puppetry have hollow heads carved with wood. Their palms and feet are also made of wood, but the torso and limbs consist entirely of cloth costumes. During a performance, a gloved hand enters the puppet's costume and make it move. The puppets used in these shows used to strongly resemble cloth sacks, hence the name "cloth bag opera".

Glove puppetry
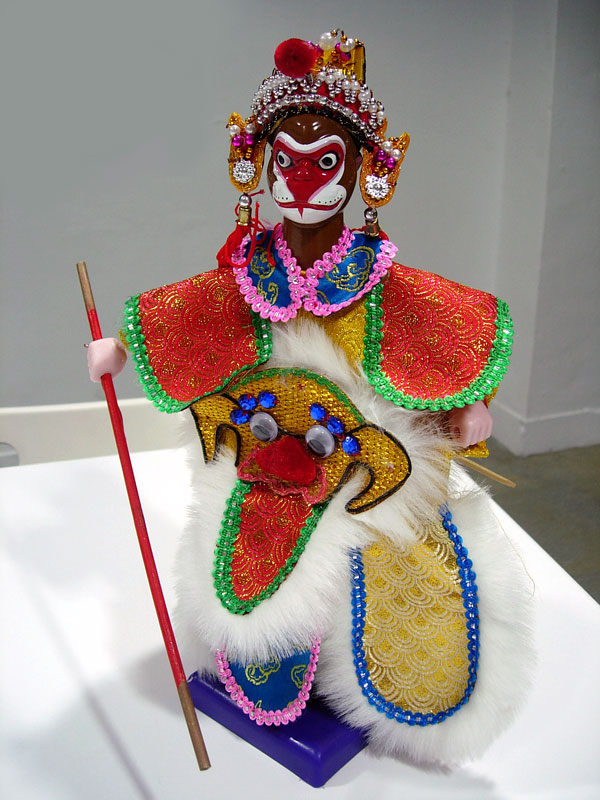
A Sun Wukong puppet used in glove puppetry; Glove puppetry is a form of opera that uses cloth puppets.

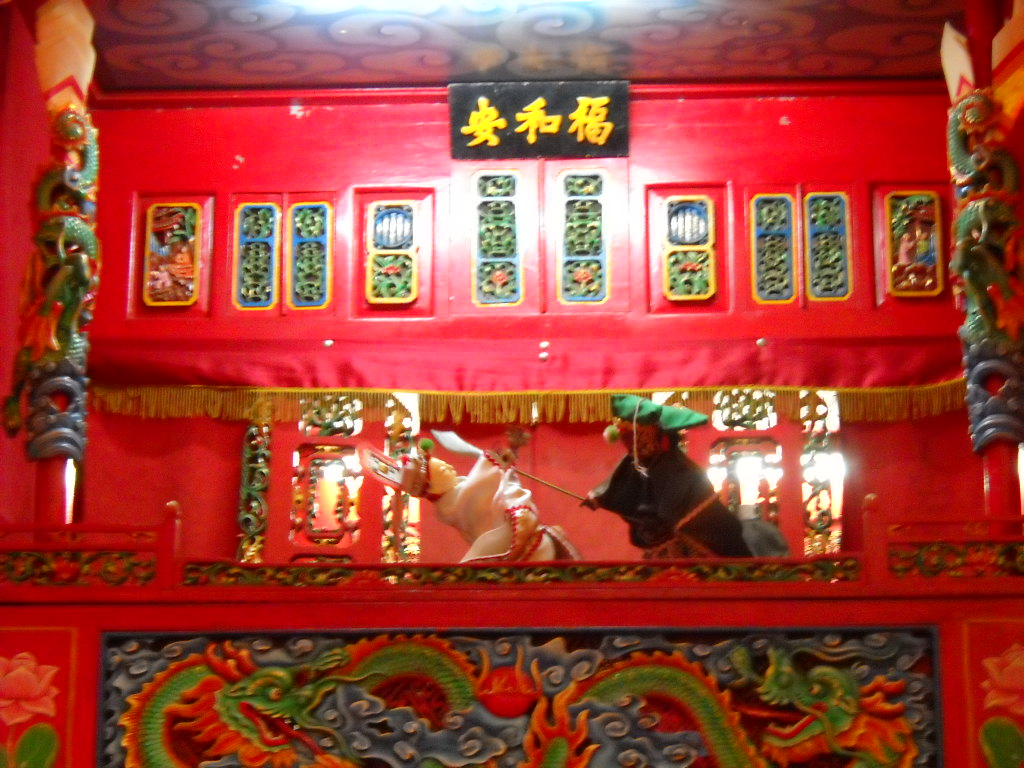
A glove puppetry performance

== Philosophy ==
=== Min school ===
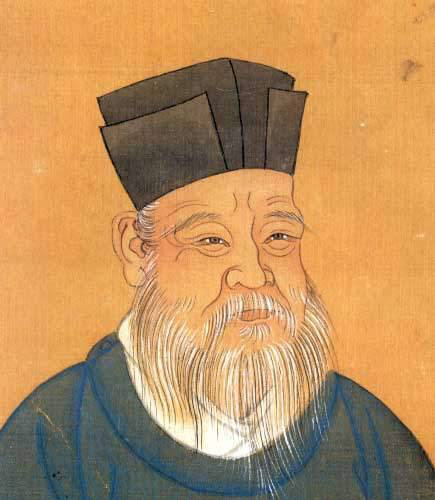
A portrait of Tsu Hi ("Zhu Xi" in Mandarin)

The Min school (Pe̍h-ōe-jī: Bân-ha̍k; Traditional Chinese: 閩學) is a Neo-confucian school founded primarily by Fuzhounese, Northern Min, Putianese, and Hoklo scholars, with Tsu Hi (1130–1200) being the leading figure. The Min school is said to be marked by (1) an emphasis on the Four Books: the Great Learning, the Doctrine of the Mean, the Analects of Confucius, and the Mencius; (2) a tendency to interpret Buddhism from the lens of Confucianism; (3) placing importance on self-perfection. Philosophy of the Min school was passed to Korea and Japan through cultural exchange during the Ming dynasty.

== Religions ==
=== Chinese folk religion & Taoism ===
The Hokkien are devoted to the Jade Emperor, who commands all Heavenly Deities and Earthly beings. They will conduct grand worship service on the 9th day of first lunar month as the birthday of Jade Emperor.

Other popular Chinese deities are Mazu, Siong Teh Gong, Bao Sheng Da Di, Guan Teh Gong, Kuan Yim Hood Chor, Ong Yah Gong, Qing Shui Zhu Shi, Kai Zhang Sheng Wang, Fu De Zheng Shen.

== Science and inventions ==
=== Shipbuilding ===
The Minyue people—the original inhabitants of Hokkien before sinicization of the region—were known for their skills in shipbuilding. Even the ancient Han Chinese, who were, by a considerable margin, the most advanced people in the region at that time, took note of Minyue's shipbuilding skills. For most of the first millennium AD, Port of Meizhou Bay of Chinchew has been one of the greatest ports of the Chinese Empire. Later, during 6th to 9th century (Tang dynasty), peoples in Hokkien were said to be able to build large ships of 50 to 60 tonnes, which was very remarkable for that time period. Hokkien remained the leading shipbuilding center for the Chinese Empire in the six centuries that followed, resulting in a strong shipbuilding tradition among Hoklo.

== Cultural symbols ==
=== Water fairy ===
Water fairy (Pe̍h-ōe-jī: Tsuí-sian; Traditional Chinese: 水仙, literally "water fairy"; English: Narcissus, jonquil) is the official provincial flower of Fujian. In the Hokkien-speaking region, it regularly appears in names for places and buildings.

== See also ==
- List of Hokkien people
- Southern Min Wikipedia
- Hui'an maidens

=== Hokkien customs ===
- Hokkien wedding
- Hokkien pre-wedding customs
- Turtleback tomb

=== Related cultures ===
- Culture of Taiwan
- Singapore Chinese culture
- Malaysian Chinese culture
- Cantonese culture
- Hakka culture
- Teochew culture
- Wuyue culture
- Fuzhou culture
- Putian culture
- Culture of Jiangxi
- Japanese culture
- Chinese culture
