= Hokkien opera =

Hokkien opera may refer to several different Chinese opera genres in the Hokkien or Southern Min topolect, which are mainly performed in southern Fujian, Taiwan, and Southeast Asia (Singapore, Malaysia, Indonesia, and Philippines):

- Taiwanese opera (歌仔戲), usually known as Xiang opera (薌劇) in Singapore (and for a time in Fujian as well)
- Kaoka opera (高甲戲)
- Lewan opera (梨園戲)
- Glove puppetry, very popular with Hokkien speakers

== See also ==
- Min opera (閩劇), an opera genre in the Eastern Min topolect, from northeastern coastal Fujian
- Puxian opera (莆仙戲), an opera genre in the Pu-Xian Min topolect, from central coastal Fujian
