= Shumei =

Shumei or Shūmei can refer to any of the following:

== People ==
- Shūmei Miyamoto (born 1996), Japanese baseball player
- Shūmei Ōkawa (1886–1957), Japanese nationalist
- Sun Shu-may or Sun Shumei, Taiwanese pop singer
- Tan Shumei (born 1989), Chinese wheelchair fencer
- Koh Sock May or Xu Shumei (1938–2023), Singaporean radio presenter
- Yu Shumei (born 1977), Chinese cross-country skier

== Other uses ==
- Shinji Shumeikai (神慈秀明会), a new religious movement started in Japan in 1970
- Church of World Messianity, a Japanese new religion related to Shinji Shumeikai
- Shūmei (襲名), a name succession ceremony in kabuki
- Shumei University, a private university located in Yachiyo, Japan

== See also ==
- Goemon: Shin Sedai Shūmei!, 2001 PlayStation video game
