= Chinchew =

Chinchew is a name used in older English books for a port in the Chinese province Fujian, and may refer to:

- Quanzhou, by later authors (the 19th century)
- Zhangzhou, by earlier authors (16th–17th century, especially as translation of Spanish/Portuguese Chincheo)
