= Gaojia opera =

Form of Chinese opera

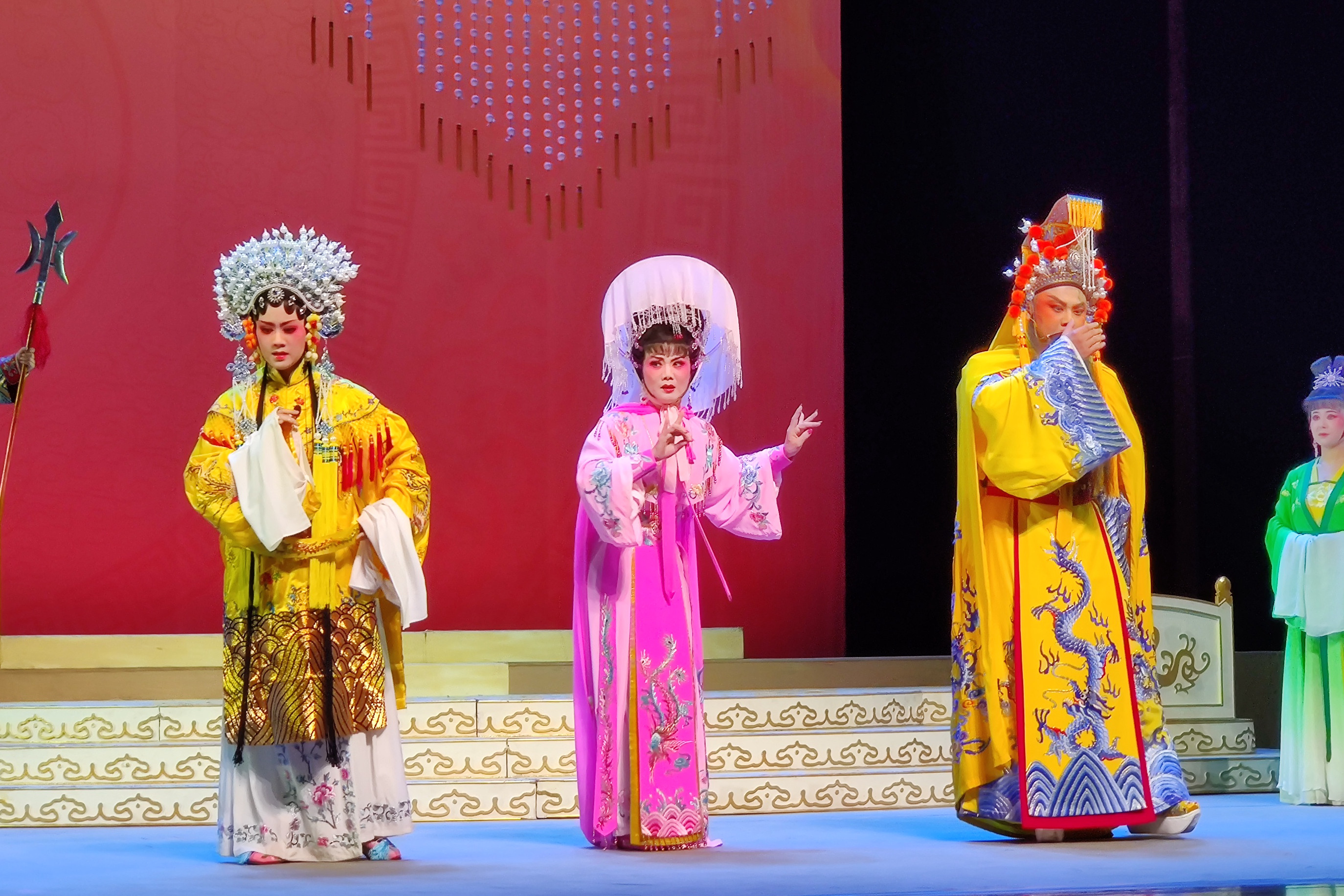
A scene from Yu Zhu Chuan (玉珠串).Starring Anxi County Gaojia Opera Troupe (安溪高甲劇團)

Gaojia opera (simplified Chinese: 高甲戏; traditional Chinese: 高甲戲; pinyin: Gāojiǎ xì; Pe̍h-ōe-jī: Ko-kah-hì / Kau-kah-hì) or Ko-kah opera is a form of Chinese opera that originated in Quanzhou, in the Hokkien (Min Nan)-speaking region of southern Fujian province, southeast China. It is famous for its various chou (clown) roles. The form emerged at the end of the Ming dynasty. It was originally an improvised form that was part of a religious parade. The performances from these parades developed into Songjiang drama (宋江戏), which told stories about the character Songjiang from the Chinese classic Water Margin and featured acrobatics and a relatively simple plot. In the middle of the Qing dynasty, it absorbed the influences of Hui opera (徽戲), Beijing opera, and Yiyang music. All music accompanying Gaojia opera is in the style of southern China, and is also influenced by Liyuan opera. In the Philippines, it is called Kaoka after the Amoy Hokkien Chinese: 高甲戲; Pe̍h-ōe-jī: Kau-kah-hì and is considered a dying tradition.
