= Koh Sock May =

Singaporean radio presenter (1938–2023)

- Koh at Capital 95.8FM studio in October 2019
- Born: 1938; Singapore
- Died: 1 October 2023 (aged 85)
- Other names: Si Di; Xu Shumei
- Occupation: Radio presenter
- Years active: 1964–2023
- Spouse: Zhang Weiming
- Children: 2

Stage name
- Traditional Chinese: 思狄
- Simplified Chinese: 思狄
- Hanyu Pinyin: Sī Dí

Birth name
- Traditional Chinese: 許淑梅
- Simplified Chinese: 许淑梅
- Hanyu Pinyin: Xǔ Shūméi

Koh Sock May (1938 − 1 October 2023), also known by her stage name Si Di, was a Singaporean radio presenter with news station Capital 95.8FM. Koh began her career in 1964 at Rediffusion Singapore. She was a member of the Amoy Hokkien drama play team, formed in 1957 by her husband Zhang Weiming. Also proficient in Mandarin, Koh worked for Rediffusion for near to 50 years.

Koh died from cancer on 1 October 2023, at the age of 85. Her wake was held at the Singapore Casket from 1 October to 5 October 2023. She was cremated at the Mandai Crematorium and Columbarium on 5 October 2023, 10.45am local time. She had a daughter and a son.
