= Liyuan opera =

Chinese opera form from Fujian, China

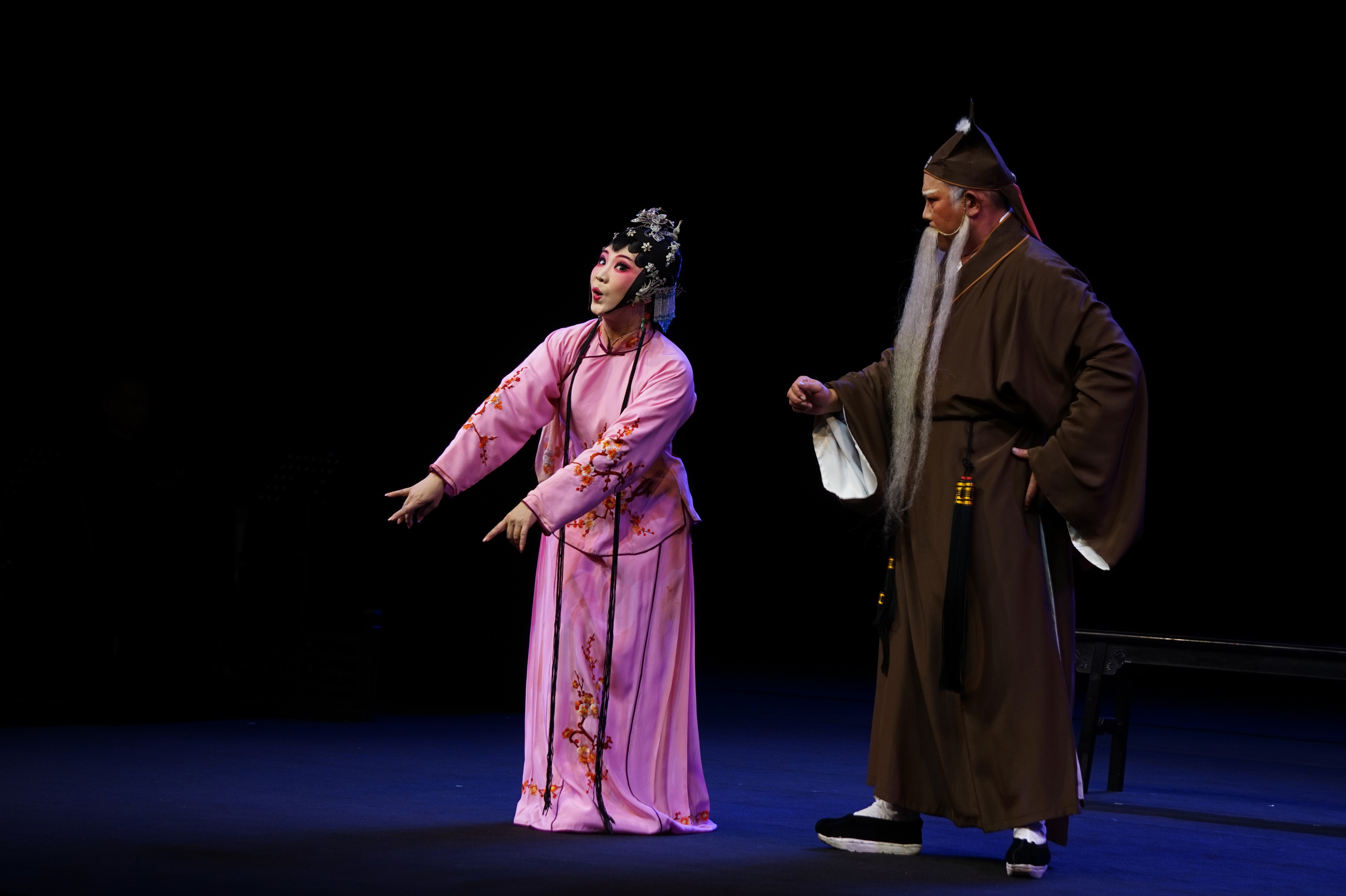
A scene from Zhu Maichen (朱買臣) . The woman in pink is Zeng Jingping, a very famous liyuan opera actress.

Liyuan opera (simplified Chinese: 梨园戏; traditional Chinese: 梨園戲; pinyin: Líyuán xì; Pe̍h-ōe-jī: Lê-hn̂g-hì) is a form of Chinese opera originating in Quanzhou city, Fujian province, China. In recent years, one of Liyuan opera's staunchest advocates and most celebrated performers has been Zeng Jingping. At the 2009 NPC session, she proposed incorporating the study of traditional operas into the national school curriculum.
