= Lunar New Year customs in Taiwan =

Traditional Taiwanese holiday

Lunar New Year in Taiwan
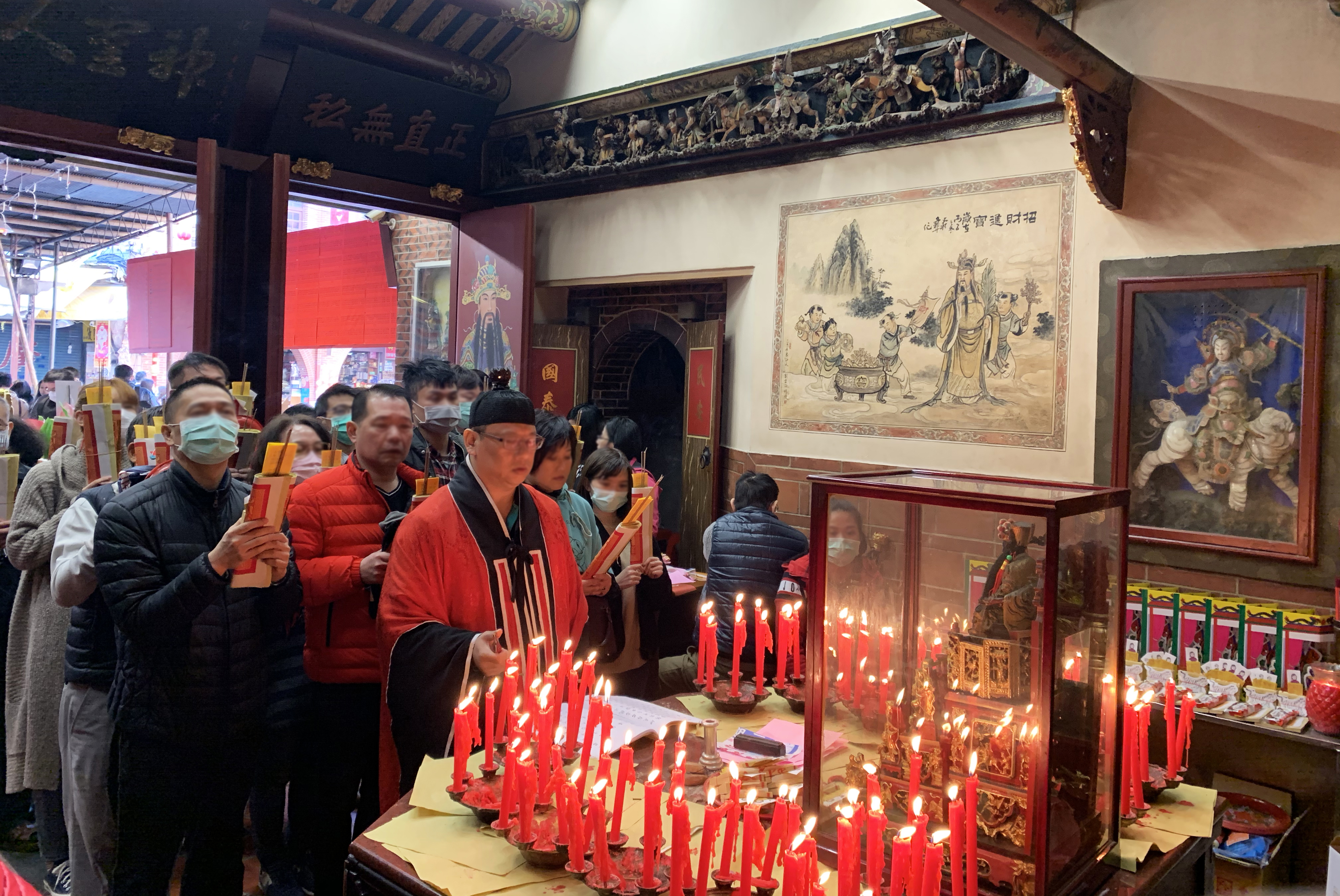
- Taiwanese people worshipping Poh Seng Tai Tay during kuè-nî.
- Also called: Guonian
- Observed by: Taiwanese people around the world
- Type: Cultural
- Significance: First day of the lunisolar calendar
- Date: Typically the second new moon after the winter solstice
- 2025 date: Wednesday, 29 January
- 2026 date: Tuesday, 17 February
- 2027 date: Saturday, 6 February
- Frequency: Annual

Lunar New Year (Chinese: 過年/舊曆年; Tâi-lô: kuè-nî/kū-li̍k-nî) is a traditional festival and one of the gazetted public holidays in Taiwan. The holiday is the start of a new year based on the traditional Lunisolar calendar.

== Terminology ==
Kuè-nî literally means "passing the year" and kū-li̍k-nî (literally "Old Calendar Year") refers to the first day of the first lunar month. During the Japanese colonial period, the governor-general of Taiwan issued a directive to "abolish the old lunar New Year" in favor of promoting the Gregorian New Year's Day. However, the Taiwanese public continued observing the lunar new year alongside the Japanese-style Gregorian New Year and the Taiwanese-style lunar New Year. Therefore, the distinction in terminology is required to distinguish between the two new years – "Old Calendar Year" (舊曆年) refers to Lunar New Year and "New Calendar Year" (新曆年) refers to the Gregorian New Year.

== Mythology ==
In Taiwan, the mythology of the origin of the festival is distinct than that of China, wherein according to Chinese legend, New Year started with combating a mythical beast called the Nian (a beast that lives under the sea or in the mountains that looks like a lion with horns) during the annual Spring Festival.

Instead, the "Legend of the Sinking Island" is dominant in Taiwanese folklore. It is said that in ancient times, people would worship the household deities and spirits of their furnishings at the end of the year to thank them for their service, yet they often inadvertently neglected the "Lamp Monkey" (an oil lamp stand or hook) on the altar. One year, the Lamp Monkey, harboring a grievance, lodged a complaint with the Jade Emperor, accusing humans of ingratitude and a lack of appreciation for their blessings. Swayed by these slanderous words, the Jade Emperor issued a decree ordering the Dragon King to unleash a massive flood and earthquake on New Year's Eve to submerge the island of Taiwan and rebuild the world. When pleas from household deities, such as the Earth God, the Kitchen God, the Bed Goddess, and the Door Gods, failed to dissuade the Jade Emperor. Hence, they appeared in the dreams of mortals to warn them. Consequently, people prepared to face the apocalypse after enjoying a sumptuous final meal. Eventually, the catastrophe was averted after Guanyin Bodhisattva and other celestial deities interceded with the Jade Emperor on humanity's behalf. When the midnight arrived at the start of the Lunar New Year, the people of Taiwan discovered that the island had not sunk. Overjoyed by this renewal of the world, Taiwanese people celebrated and exchanged congratulations.

== Customs ==
=== Pre-Lunar New Year ===
==== Weiya ====
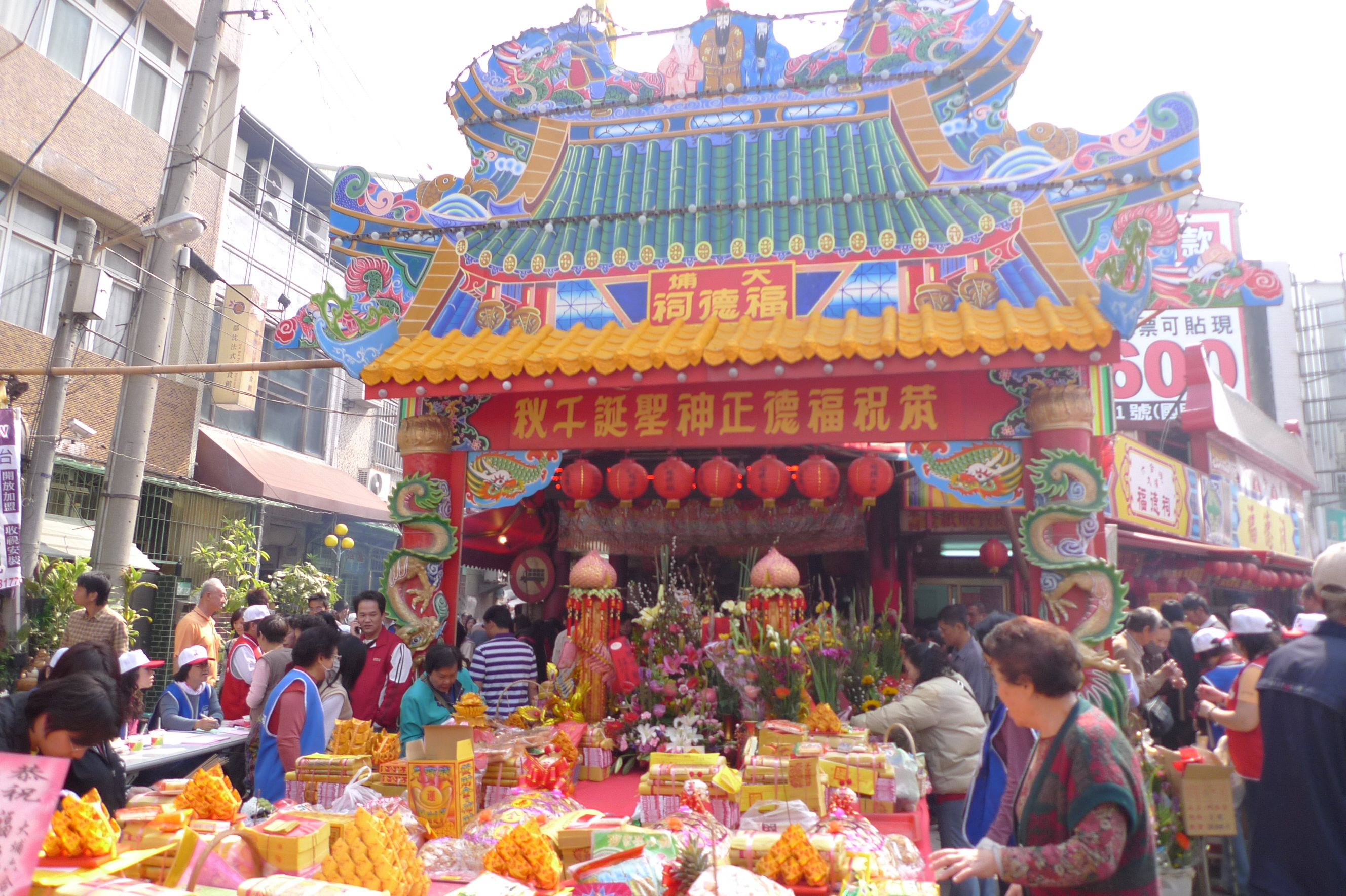
Weiya festival in Tainan

In Taiwan, the tradition is to worship the Earth God on the 16th day of the twelfth month, known as Weiya (Chinese: 尾牙). This is a traditional annual celebration for Tu Di Gong (the earth god, also known as Fude Zhengshen (Chinese: 福德正神), the god of wealth and merit). The public will usually gather some meat and fruit for the ceremony, and they will share the food after the ceremony. Traditionally, there will be a series of ceremonies in front of the Tu Di Gong temple. People will bring firecrackers, candles, and sacrifices to the temple.

In modern-day Taiwan, Weiya is also an occasion for employers to treat their employees to a banquet to thank them for their hard work throughout the year, where it has taken on another role in Taiwanese culture and society. It is not only a religious ceremony, but has also become a social event in many companies. Employers will treat their employees to a traditional Weiya banquet to show their thankfulness for their employee's hard work over the past year. It is a way for the employers to communicate with their employees, so it has become a big catering event in many companies. Many different entertaining shows come along with the Weiya banquet. Many large companies will spend a lot on hiring performers or having a prize draw.

This is different to China, which was influenced by the Cultural Revolution, wherein the 16th of the twelfth month was changed to ancestor worship.

==== Little new year ====
"Seeing off the Gods Ritual" (Sàng-sîn), also known Little New Year, is celebrated on the 24th day of the 12th month in the lunisolar calendar, marking the start of the new year celebration. It is believed that on this day, the deities amongst humands must return to the Heavenly Court and report to the Jade Emperor, ruler of heaven and earth. Thus, every household prepares sweet food offerings like sticky sweet glutinous rice balls for their returning deities.

==== Spring cleaning ====
Before the new year, homes are traditionally swept clean using bamboo leaves, a ritual believed to chase evil spirits, along with any bad luck or energy from the previous year, out of homes. It is customary not to clean by sweeping, mopping, scrubbing, or washing on the first day of Lunar New Year as it sweeps away good luck. Similarly, it is believed that hair should not be cut during the new year as any good luck would be snipped away. During this time, houses are also decorated with flower pots and red decorations such as scrolls and posters with auspicious phrases are put up at the main doorway.

==== Threading and haircuts ====
On the 25th day of the twelfth lunar month, women traditionally undergo facial threading (挽面); men get haircuts and groom themselves in preparation for the Lunar New Year. Haircuts and facial threading symbolize a fresh start and a complete renewal from head to toe, hoping to welcome the busy festive season with a refreshed appearance. People also tend to wash their cars before the lunar new year, so hairdressers and car washes would typically raise their prices after Weiya had passed.

=== Lunar New Year's eve ===
==== Ancestor worship ====
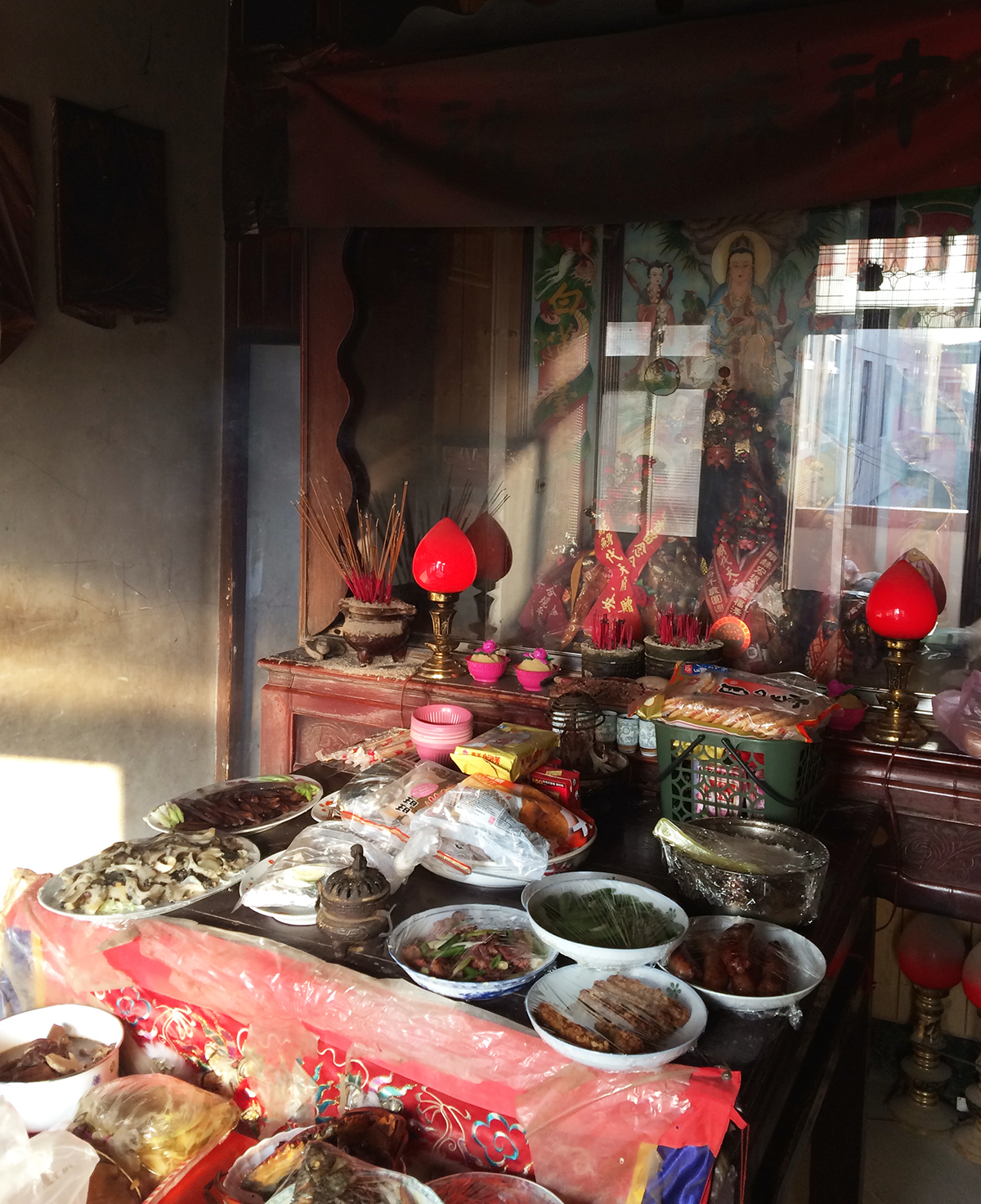
Ancestor worship.

Ancestor worship (tsè-tsóo) occurs on the eve of Lunar New Year before the family reunion dinner. Families worship their ancestors by offering joss sticks, prayers, and food offerings to invite their late family members to join the new year celebrations.

==== Reunion dinner ====
The tradition of the reunion dinner is held on the eve of Lunar New Year. Family members travel home to share a meal with their loved ones. The meal consists of symbolic foods that represent various blessings for the coming year, for example fish for abundance and tangerines for good fortune. Traditional delicacies served during the reunion dinner include pineapple cakes, kuihs, mochis, and mustard green vegetable (長年菜), symbolizing prosperity, good fortune, and longevity. Taiwan's Lunar New Year reunion dinner food reflects the nation's diverse heritage, blending Hokkien, Hakka, and indigenous influences.

==== Red evenvelopes ====
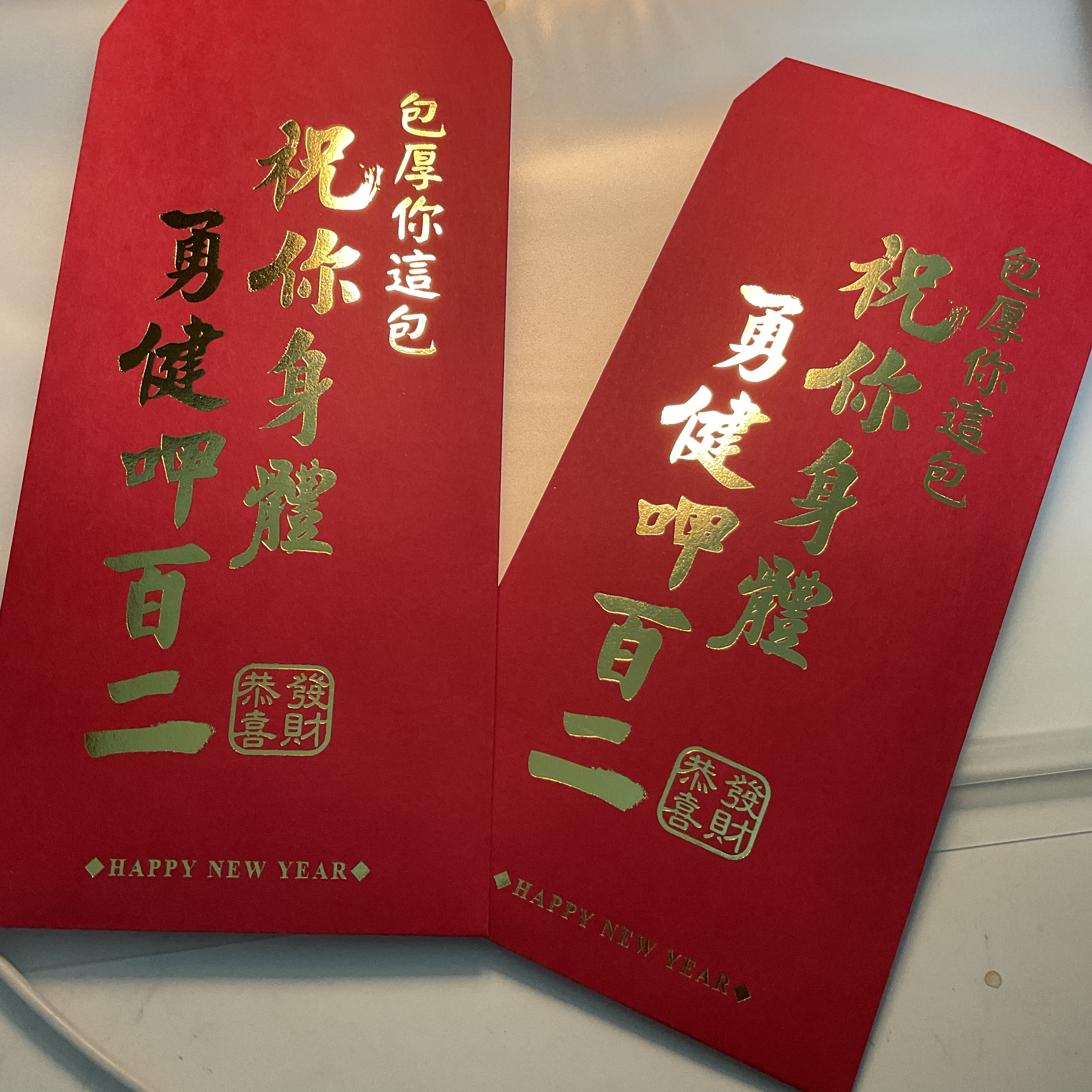
The Lucky Red Envelopes in Lunar New Year

During the new year, âng-pau (red envelopes) containing money are typically given by married adults to those who are unmarried, younger siblings and cousins, and other relatives in the younger generation. In many cases, parents are also gifted these red packets. The money packed into the red packet should be an even number except ending with 4, with 8 being the most auspicious number. Odd numbers are usually associated with giving condolence money at funerals except ending with 9.

==== Lunar New Year's eve vigil ====
On the night before the new year, children are urged to stay awake past midnight. Post-dinner activities typically include playing games, watching television, and spending time with family. This not only serves as bidding the previous year farewell and welcoming the new year, but it is also believed to bring longevity to one's parents and grandparents. The longer the children stay awake, the longer the lives of their parents and grandparents.

=== Lunar New Year ===
Taiwanese Lunar New Year celebrations span several days, each with specific customs and traditions. The first six days are particularly significant, as they mark different aspects of welcoming the new year, honoring deities, and strengthening family bonds.

==== Day 1: Visiting Temples ====
On the first day of the new year, people dress in new (preferably red) clothes and visit temples to pray for peace and prosperity in the coming year. This practice is called kiânn-tshun (行春), which translates to "spring outings". Families also visit relatives and friends to exchange New Year greetings, this is colloquially known as pài-nî (拜年) or hō-tsiann (賀正). There are several taboos on this day, including avoiding sweeping the floor (to prevent sweeping away good luck), breaking dishes (which is mitigated by saying "suìsuì píng’ān" (歲歲平安), meaning "peace year after year"), and arguing. Additionally, it is considered inauspicious to eat porridge on this day, as porridge was traditionally associated with poverty. Before visits commence, children greet and pay their respects to their parents and elder relatives. At this time, red packets are usually given to children. On the first day, close and senior family members, such as parents or grandparents, are visited.

One unique Lunar New Year tradition in Taiwan that differs to China is the practice of political leaders such as the president, government officials, and local leaders often distribute red envelopes to the public during public events as a symbolic gesture of goodwill and prosperity for the new year. These envelopes typically contain NT$1, symbolizing the phrase yīyuán fùshǐ, wànsiàng gēngsīn (一元復始、萬象更新), meaning "a new beginning and endless renewal".

==== Day 2: Returning to the Wife's Family ====
Traditionally, the second day is for married women to visit their maiden homes (後頭厝, āu-thâu-tshù). The families bring gifts and red envelopes, ensuring that both the number of items and the monetary amounts are even, as odd numbers are considered unlucky. This practice is not often seen in China, especially when the couples come from different provinces.

==== Day 3: Letting Mice Marry ====
The third day is when mice hold their weddings, so people are discouraged from social visits, encouraged to go to bed early and scatter rice grains and salt in the corners of their homes to maintain harmony between humans and mice.

==== Day 4: Welcoming the Gods ====
Welcoming the Gods

The fourth day is known as the tsih-sîn (接神日), people prepare offerings to welcome back the gods who had ascended to the heavens before the new year. This tradition originates from the belief that deities return to inspect households and bring blessings. Offerings typically include three types of meats, four kinds of fruits, steamed rice cakes (Fa gao), candies, three cups of tea, and joss paper. An important folk saying goes: Sàng-sîn ài tsá, tsih-sîn ài uànn, which means that the ritual to send the gods off should take place in the morning or the early hours (the earlier, the better), whereas welcoming them back is typically done in the afternoon or later in the evening.

==== Day 5: Businesses reopen ====
The fifth day marks the end of several New Year taboos. Contrary to China, where businesses usually re-open on the sixteenth day of the Lunar New Year, in Taiwan, businesses traditionally re-open on the fifth day of the Lunar New Year and companies hold ceremonies to welcome the God of Wealth, as this is believed to bring prosperity to the company. Firecrackers are often set off to drive away bad energy accumulated over the holiday period. However, one restriction remains, e.g., earthmoving activities, such as digging or construction, are still avoided, as they are believed to invite misfortune.

== Modern day practice ==
Whilst traditional practices like offering sacrifices to the gods and enjoying symbolic foods remain central to the festivities, modern-day elements such as shopping and travelling have become popular in recent years due to changing lifestyles. In the past, when material resources were relatively scarce, new clothes and lavish meals were often reserved for the Lunar New Year, lending the occasion a special sense of ritual. However, today, most families enjoy an abundance of food and clothing, with the freedom to satisfy their cravings or make purchases at any time. Furthermore, the wide array of entertainment options means people are no longer limited to traditional activities like festive outings or visiting relatives to pass the time.

=== Lunar New Year holiday traffic ===
In Taiwan, heavy traffic on the nation's freeways over the Lunar New Year holiday happens every year as people rush home for the holidays.

== See also ==
- Lunar New Year
- Celebrations of the Lunar New Year in other parts of Asia:
  - Chinese New Year (Spring Festival)
  - Korean New Year (Seollal)
  - Japanese New Year (Shōgatsu)
  - Mongolian New Year (Tsagaan Sar)
  - Chinese New Year customs in Singapore
  - Tibetan New Year (Losar)
  - Vietnamese New Year (Tết Nguyên Đán)
- Similar Asian Lunisolar New Year celebrations that occur in April:
  - Burmese New Year (Thingyan)
  - Cambodian New Year (Chaul Chnam Thmey)
  - Lao New Year (Pii Mai)
  - Bengali New Year (Pahela Baisakh)
  - Sri Lankan New Year (Aluth Avuruddu)
  - Thai New Year (Songkran)
