= Fireworks policy in China =

Legal restrictions of fireworks in China

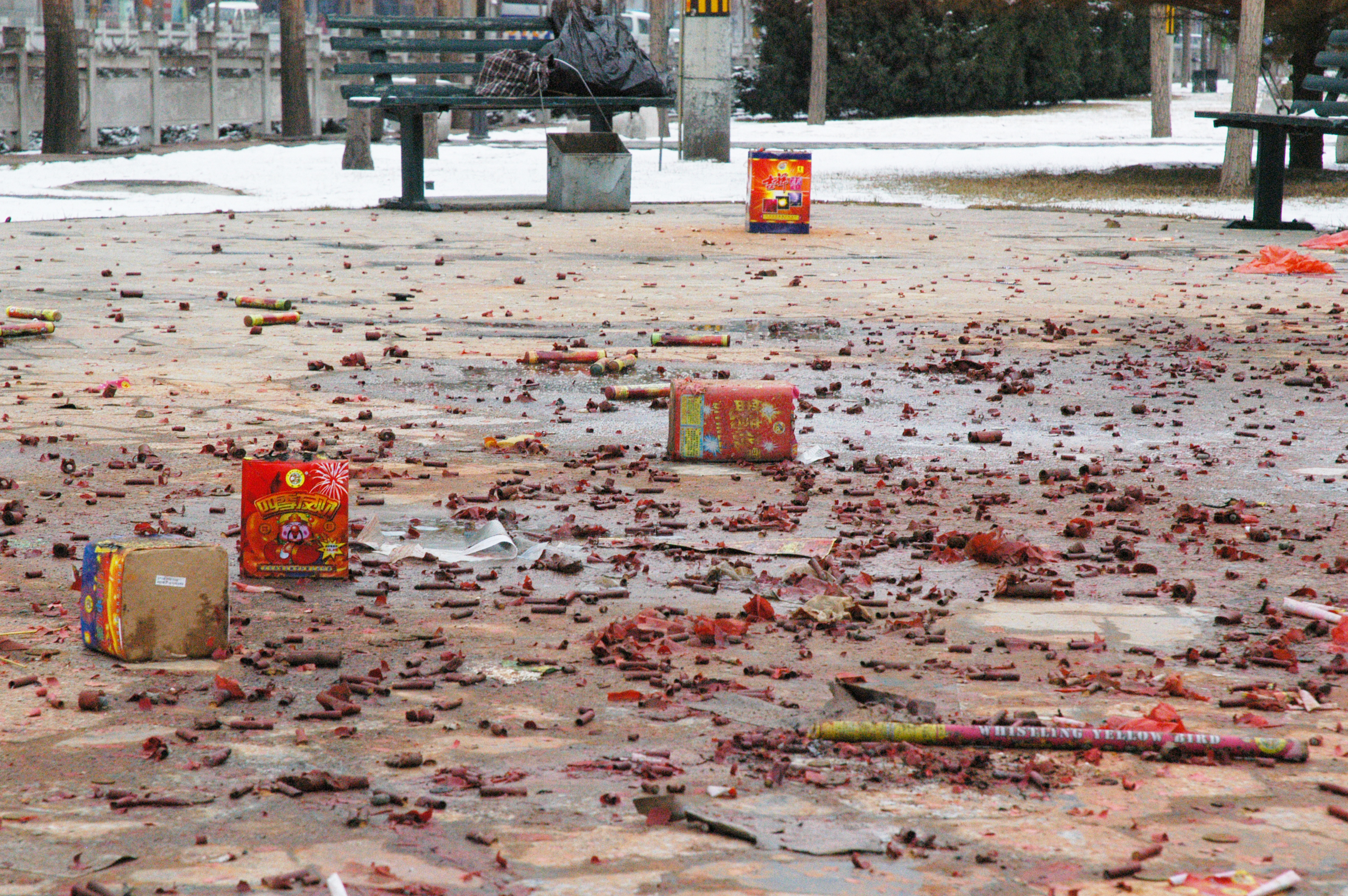
Used fireworks after Chinese New Year in Beijing

The use of fireworks in China is subject to regulations and has long been prohibited in many regions. The government has implemented a series of laws and regulations to control the use of fireworks.

== History of fireworks regulations in China ==
The idea of banning fireworks in China first appeared in the 1980s. In 1984, the State Council of the People's Republic of China promulgated the "Regulations on the Administration of Civil Explosives". After that, Beijing promulgated and implemented the "Interim Regulations on the Safety Administration of Fireworks" which formulated by the local public security bureau on December 1, 1986. In 1987, 114 deputies put forward seven motions to restrict or prohibit the discharging of fireworks in the fifth session of the Sixth National People's Congress (NPC) in China. On March 19, 1992, the People's Congress of Guangzhou promulgated the "Regulations on the Administration of Fireworks and Firecrackers in Guangzhou". On June 1, 2014, the law was implemented, and explicitly prohibited any unit or individual from setting off fireworks and firecrackers within the eight districts, including Yuexiu. After the Spring Festival in 1993, 308 deputies from National People's Congress (NPC) and the Chinese People's Political Consultative Conference (CPPCC) proposed legislation to strictly ban fireworks and firecrackers. On October 12, 1993, the local law on "Regulations on Banning Fireworks and Firecrackers in Beijing" was discussed and executed at the sixth session of the Tenth Standing Committee of the National People's Congress (NPCSC).

However, the atmosphere of the Spring Festival began to desalinate with the banning of fireworks. In December 2003, Qingdao City, in east China's Shandong Province, revised the original "ban" policy for fireworks and firecrackers, stipulating that fireworks and firecrackers could be used during the Spring Festival. According to the survey from the Beijing Municipal Bureau of Statistics in 2005, 80% of the 6,000 respondents favored lifting the ban. In order to meet the growing demand of the public, many cities broke the ban, stipulating that citizens can set off qualified fireworks at a limited time and place to restore the festive atmosphere. Therefore, the 22nd Meeting of the Standing Committee of the 12th People's Congress of Beijing Municipality deliberated and passed the "Provisions of Beijing Municipality on the Safety Management of Fireworks" on September 9, 2005, which changed the ban to "three limits"; that is, in a limited time, place, and varieties of fireworks and firecrackers. In order to strengthen the safety management of fireworks and firecrackers, prevent explosion accidents, ensure the safety of public, individual and property, the state council implemented the "Regulations on the Safety Administration of Fireworks and Firecrackers" on January 21, 2006, which has made strict provisions on the production, management, transportation and discharge of fireworks and firecrackers. By the end of 2006, more than 200 cities in China had changed from the ban on fireworks to limited ban.

Still, there was a shift in public opinion about fireworks. The catastrophic fires that had occurred from 2009 to 2011, as well as the severe haze pollution in many cities in 2013, strengthened the idea of supporting the prohibition of fireworks. According to a random survey conducted by The Beijing News on the eve of the Spring Festival in 2014, 70% of 115 respondents surveyed said they did not buy any fireworks and firecrackers, and more than 80% believed that fireworks had a serious impact on air quality. Since December 2017, the central areas of most cities have upgraded restricted discharge to a total ban for fireworks, and the scope of fire prohibition areas has been gradually expanded. Moreover, punishment measures have been upgraded accordingly. Although many cities maintain "restrictions," but also introduced more inclined to prohibit the new policies. According to statistics released by the ministry of public security in January 2018, fireworks are banned in 444 cities nationwide, including 10 provincial capitals, 91 prefecture-level cities and 343 counties. Besides, fireworks are restricted in 764 cities, which include 4 municipalities, 15 provincial capitals, 174 prefecture-level cities and 571 counties.

In 2026, many major cities in China such as Chengdu, Zhengzhou and Shanxi Province started to lift the ban on fireworks.

== Reasons for bans ==
Fireworks display is a traditional way for the public to celebrate festivals in China. A large number of fireworks were set off during every festival, especially for the Spring Festival in China. Although fireworks can bring visual enjoyment to people, they also impact the environment and health.

=== Environment ===
The pollution of fireworks on the environment has become more apparent in time. Fireworks cause serious pollution environments in a short time. Although fireworks are not the most common source of pollution in the atmosphere, they are a source of ozone, sulfur, dioxide and nitrogen oxide, as well as aerosols. Fireworks also contain tiny metal particles. These metals are burned to produce color for fireworks: copper for blue, strontium or lithium for red, and barium compounds for bright green or white. When fireworks are set off in the air, a large number of incomplete decomposition or degradation of metal particles, dangerous toxins, harmful chemicals remain in the air for a long time, resulting in air pollution.

In addition to the chemical residue in the air, the fireworks residue that fell on land also have negative effects on the ground environment. One of the main fuel sources in fireworks is perchlorate, a chemical which contains highs water solubility, fluidity and stability. Since it can be stable in the environment for decades, it is considered as a new type of persistent inorganic pollutant. With the efficient development of separation and detection methods, perchlorate has been detected in a variety of environmental media. Due to its high water solubility, perchlorate may pollute watercourses.

=== Health ===
The adverse effects of fireworks on human health and the environmental pollution caused by fireworks are a causal relationship. As the environment in which people grow is polluted, their health will surely be affected. The most apparent effect of fireworks is on the respiratory system. Since fireworks produce smoke and a lot of harmful particles, these harmful chemicals can enter the respiratory tract through breathing and cause cough, fever, breathing difficulties, and some acute eosinophilic pneumonia. These symptoms are more likely to occur in children and the elderly, who are less able to defend themselves against gaseous air pollutants and to metabolize environmental pollutants than adults. Depends on the research from India, the number of patients with respiratory diseases such as asthma and bronchitis increased by 30 to 40 per cent during the period when fireworks were heavily used.

Besides, perchlorate not only causes water pollution but also harmful to the health of people. People may contact it by breathing, diet or skin contact. In 2005, the United States Environmental Protection Agency determined a safe reference dose for perchlorate of up to 0.0007 mg kg per day. However, since a large number of fireworks being set off in China during the festival, especially from the first day of the Lunar New Year to the 15th day, the daily intake of perchlorate is far above the standard. Exposure to excessive perchlorate may result in decreased thyroid hormone secretion leading to hypothyroidism, especially for children and developing fetuses. Perchlorate excess in the body of infants and young children can lead to low intelligence quotient, learning disabilities, developmental delays, attention deficit hyperactivity disorder, distraction and even intellectual disability.

The noise produced by fireworks is also dangerous to human health that cannot be ignored. According to the research, the ambient noise level when the fireworks are discharged is 1.2 to 1.3 times the average level. Lack of sleep due to noise pollution has become the norm during the Spring Festival. However, the effects of noise on health are serious. Excessive noise not only harmful to the ears, which can lead to tinnitus and even deafness but also causes a series of psychological diseases, such as increased stress, anxiety, communication difficulties and cognitive deficit.

The impact of fireworks on people's health is not only diseases but even life safety. Fireworks and firecrackers are inflammable, explosive and dangerous goods, which are easy to cause accidents. For example, in September 2014, an explosion at a fireworks factory in Hunan province killed at least 12 people and injured 33. Any spark can set off an explosion, so fireworks are inherently dangerous. These accidents occur not only during production but also during use. From 2013 to 2018, a total of 1,452 fires caused by fireworks were reported in Henan province, four people were killed and two injured, with direct property losses of 8.78 million yuan.

== Culture influence of fireworks regulations ==
Since fireworks have existed in China for a few thousand years, they became a part of Chinese culture. Many people think that the ban on fireworks makes the Spring Festival and the other festivals lose their atmospheres, the ban on fireworks is a process of loose culture. In ancient China, fireworks and firecrackers are used to expel "Nian", a monster mix between a dragon and a Kirin. However, the custom of setting off fireworks during the Spring Festival is prohibited or restricted due to the widespread pollution and destruction of the environment. When the festive days become quiet because of the ban of fireworks, people feel that the flavor of the Spring Festival or the traditional culture is losing, more and more people begin to resist the regulations. Feng Ji, a well-known Chinese writer and adviser to the State Council, believes that the regulation is irresponsible for cultural traditions since the traditional culture which has been preserved for thousands of years in China is abandoned when fireworks banned to protect the environment. Since people think that cultural traditions are fragile in modern society, once they disappear, it is difficult to recover, people start agreeing to lift the ban. Therefore, the regulations on fireworks were relaxed in 2006 and 2017 due to the influence of traditional cultural concepts. Although the law has been relaxed, the pollution of the environment has not been ignored. Local government officials suggest that fireworks manufacturers should improve the quality and make their products less polluted, the authorities should severely punish the violators, strengthen education on the safety of setting off fireworks, so as to achieve the coexistence of environment and traditional culture.
