= Weiya =

Chinese traditional festivity

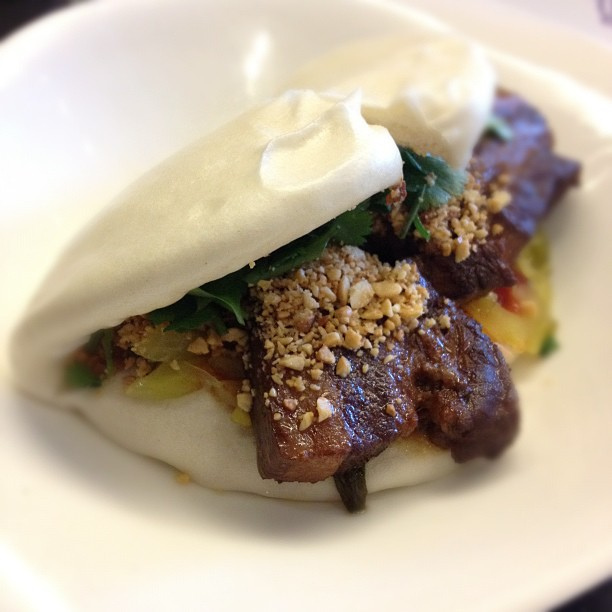
- Yibao, a traditional food for Weiya
- Also called: Weima (simplified Chinese: 尾祃; traditional Chinese: 尾禡)
- Observed by: Chinese, Taiwanese
- Type: Cultural, East Asian
- Significance: the last annual celebration for the earth god
- Observances: Consumption of Koah-pau, Popiah, etc.
- Date: 16th day of the 12th lunar month
- 2025 date: 15 January
- 2026 date: 3 February
- 2027 date: 23 January
- 2028 date: 12 January

Weiya (Chinese: 尾牙) is a traditional annual celebration for Tu Di Gong (the earth god, also known as Fude Zhengshen (Chinese: 福德正神), the god of wealth and merit) on the 16th of the 12th lunar month in Chinese society, especially in Taiwan. Weiya is the last of the bimonthly Ya festivals honoring the earth god in the Chinese lunar calendar. In Taiwan, Weiya is also an occasion for employers to treat their employees to a banquet to thank them for their hard work throughout the year.

== Origin ==
Ya (Chinese: 牙), originally means the agent who is trading in the market. In ancient times, the Chinese used the character ‘hu’ (Chinese: 互) to describe the action of trading. In the Tang dynasty, ‘hu’ and ‘ya’ became similar in writing, so people started to use ‘Ya’ to describe the action of trading instead of ‘hu’ ever since then.

The Ya-festival was first started to celebrate and show people's respect to Tu Di Gong, believing that Tu Di Gong was the god who could protect their business and bring more customers. Taiwanese businessmen, especially, have traditionally been superstitions on dedicating to many different gods who may be able to prevent accidents or to improve their business. Businessmen who are trading in the market believe Tu Di Gong is the god who has the power to protect the ground, while they mostly have actual shops to do business. Since then, the ’Ya’-festival has been a tradition in Chinese society and especially in Taiwan.

The public will usually gather some meat and fruit for the ceremony, and they will share the food after the ceremony. During normal times in a year, the ceremonies tend to be small, but the end of year ceremony (Weiya) is the biggest one. Traditionally, Weiya is the day to hold a ceremony for the ‘Fude Zhengshen’ (Tu Di Gong). There will be a series of ceremonies in front of the Tu Di Gong temple. People will bring firecrackers, candles, and sacrifices to the temple.

== Modern times ==
Weiya in modern times has taken on another role in Taiwanese culture and society. It is not only a religious ceremony, but has also become a social event in many companies. Employers will treat their employees to a traditional Weiya banquet to show their thankfulness for their employee's hard work over the past year. It is a way for the employers to communicate with their employees, so it has become a big catering event in many companies. Many different entertaining shows come along with the Weiya banquet. Many large companies will spend a lot on hiring performers or having a prize draw.

In the old Sino-Taiwanese culture, there would be a boiled chicken dish in the Weiya banquet, if the employer decided not to keep hiring an employee in the coming year, they would serve the soup to the table with the chicken's head pointing at an employee as a hint that he or she might be dismissed. Employers usually give out an end of year bonus. If an employee does not receive it, that can mean that he or she might be facing possible dismissal. This has made the Weiya banquet a stressful time for employees. However, the relationship between employers and their employees has slightly changed in the recent times, and Weiya banquets have changed as well. The chicken head has been avoided in most of the Weiya banquet's menu.

== Traditional food ==
There are a few traditional foods made by ordinary Taiwanese families during the Weiya time. Koah-pau (Chinese: 割包), a steamed bun with a slit in the middle, contains pork, peanut powder, coriander and Chinese pickle, etc. Popiah (Chinese: 潤餅), a freshly made alternative of traditional Chinese spring roll. Both dishes are commonly made at the time of Weiya as a way to celebrate it.

== Taboos ==
Weiya is an event in which businessmen hope for better business in the coming year. In Taiwanese culture, medical centers, pharmacies and funeral homes will not celebrate Weiya since it would be inappropriate for these kinds of businesses to hope for better business.
