= Nian =

Chinese mythological beast

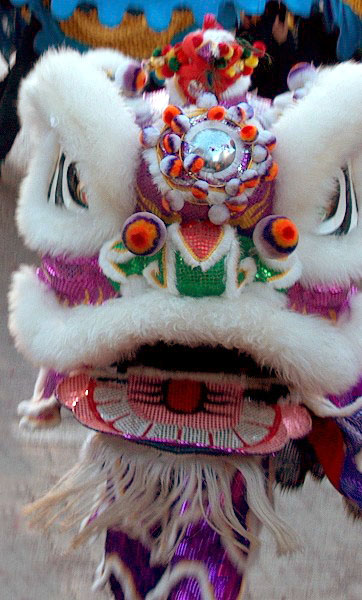
- Southern Chinese lion dance is said to relate to driving away the Nian
- Traditional Chinese: 年獸
- Simplified Chinese: 年兽
Transcriptions
Standard Mandarin
- Hanyu Pinyin: Nián shòu
- Bopomofo: ㄋㄧㄢˊ ㄕㄡˋ
- Wade–Giles: Nien^{2} shou^{4}
- Tongyong Pinyin: Nián shòu
- IPA: [njɛ̌n.ʂôʊ]
Yue: Cantonese
- Jyutping: nin4 sau3
- IPA: [nin˩ sɐw˧]

A nian beast (traditional Chinese: 年獸; simplified Chinese: 年兽; Hanyu Pinyin: Nián shòu; Tongyong Pinyin: Nián shòu; Wade–Giles: Nien^{2} shou^{4}; Cantonese Yale: Nìhn sau; Zhuyin Fuhao: ㄋㄧㄢˊ ㄕㄡˋ) is a beast in Chinese mythology. According to Chinese mythology, the nian lives under the sea or in the mountains. The Chinese character nian more usually means "year" or "new year". The earliest written sources that refer to the nian as a creature date to the early 20th century. As a result, it is unclear whether the nian creature is an authentic part of traditional folk mythology, or a part of a local oral tradition that was recorded in the early 20th century. Nian is one of the key characters in the Chinese New Year. Scholars cite it as the reason behind several practices during the celebration, such as wearing red clothing and creating noise from drums and fireworks.

== Modern legends ==
Once every year at the beginning of Chinese New Year, the nian would come out of its hiding place to feed, mostly on people and animals. During the winter, when food was scarce, it would raid villages, eating the crops and sometimes the villagers themselves - particularly their children. Several accounts describe its appearance, with some claiming that it resembles a flat-faced lion with the body of a dog and prominent incisors. Other authors described it as larger than an elephant with two long horns and many sharp teeth. The weaknesses of the nian are purported to be a sensitivity to loud noises, fire, and a fear of the color red.

Some local legends attribute the Chinese lion dance (舞獅) to the nian. The tradition has its origins in a story of a nian's attack on a village. After the attack, the villagers discussed how to make the nian leave them in peace. Since it was discovered that the beast was afraid of the color red, people put red lanterns and spring scrolls on their windows and doors. They would also leave food at their doorstep in a bid to divert it from eating humans. Other sources say that an old man who came to visit actually informed the villagers of the nian's weaknesses.

The traditions of firecrackers, red lanterns, and red robes found in many lion dance portrayals originate from the villagers' practice of hitting drums, plates, and empty bowls, wearing red robes, and throwing firecrackers, causing loud banging sounds to intimidate the nian. According to this same myth, it was captured by Hongjun Laozu, an ancient Taoist monk, and became his mount.

== Ancient sources ==
Various aspects of cultural practices relating to Chinese New Year are part of the nian legend. These cultural practices are recorded in ancient texts, though none of them refer to a creature called nian.

The Erya records that the character nian (年) was first used to mean "year" during the Zhou dynasty, replacing terms used in previous eras. The Shuowen Jiezi records that the character nian meant "ripeness of grains" and was composed of the character "he" (禾, rice plant) and "qian" (千, indicating the sound) and quotes the Chunqiu, which uses it in the sense of a great harvest.

The attributes of the nian creature in the modern legend, of fear of noise and fire, correlate with ancient legends relating to the use of firecrackers to drive off ape-like creatures in the mountains called shanxiao (山魈), first recorded in the Shanhaijing.

The practice of sweeping and cleaning at the start of the year is recorded in Zhou dynasty sources as intended to ward off plague spirits, and the practice of using music and drama to receive gods and ward off plague spirits is recorded from the same era. The creature's role in the celebration of the Chinese New Year is highlighted by the way the Chinese call this holiday Guo Nian, which means "pass over nian" or "overcome nian."

== See also ==
- Chinese mythology in popular culture
- Dragon
- Four Perils
- Three Delivery (animated show where the Nian appeared in an episode)
- Yule Goat
