= Bangladeshi English =

Accent of English spoken in Bangladesh

- Native to: Bangladesh
- Region: South Asia
- Language family: Indo-European: Germanic; West Germanic; North Sea Germanic; Anglo-Frisian; English; British English; South Asian English; Bangladeshi English
- Early forms: Proto-Indo-European: Proto-Germanic; Old English; Middle English; Early Modern English
- Writing system: Latin (English alphabet); Unified English Braille

Language codes
- ISO 639-3: –
- IETF: en-BD

Bangladeshi English is a native variety of the English language that has evolved since its introduction in Bangladesh primarily as a medium of administration, education, and commerce during British colonial rule in the eighteenth century.

After independence in 1971, amid nationalist efforts to decolonize institutions, Bengali was established as the sole state language. But English still retained a significant role in higher education, government documents, judicial proceedings, and mass media, alongside remaining a compulsory subject in primary and secondary education.

Linguistically, Bangladeshi English is distinguished by phonological features deeply influenced by the Bengali substrate. These include the monophthongization of diphthongs, the neutralization of aspiration contrasts, and the absence of certain English consonant clusters and vowel lengths in Bengali phonology. Its lexical innovations include the addition of Bengali loanwords to express local flora, fauna, and cultural concepts; calques and simplified syntactic structures, adapted for non-native speakers using it as a lingua franca in multinational professional environments, are also observed.

Classified as an emerging postcolonial variety within the framework of World Englishes, this language exemplifies the nativization processes observed in other South Asian Englishes. Some critics opine that deficient pronunciation has hindered intelligibility.

== Use ==
Bengali is the sole official and national language of Bangladesh. However, English is often used secondarily in the higher tier of the judiciary in the country. Laws were written in English during the British Raj.

Since the introduction of Bangla Bhasha Procholon Ain, all the laws by parliament and all Ordinances promulgated by the President are being enacted in Bengali in Bangladesh.

There are ten English language newspapers in Bangladesh. English medium schools are also operated in English. Mainly, the people of Bangladeshi descent residing in the UK, Canada, Australia, New Zealand and the US and students of English medium schools in Bangladesh use Benglish (though the teaching of Standard English is also attempted).

However, upon public demand in 2012, the High Court of Bangladesh banned the use of Benglish, described as a slang mixture of Bengali and English, in radio and television programs "to protect local tongue".

Benglish is a term that has been used in academic papers to describe a mixture of Bangla and English. For example, Benglish verbs are described as a particular type of complex predicate that consists of an English word and a Bengali verb, such as æksiḍenṭ kôra 'to have an accident', in kôra 'to get/come/put in' or kônfyus kôra 'to confuse'.

== History ==
The East India Company adopted English as the official language of the empire in 1835. Replacement of the Persian language with English was followed by a surge in English language learning among Bengali babus. English remained an official language of the region until 1956 when the first constitution of Pakistan was adopted stating Bengali and Urdu as the official languages of the state following the Bengali language movement from 1947 to 1952.

After independence in 1971, Bengali became the sole official language of Bangladesh, and all English-medium universities, schools and colleges were converted to Bengali instruction in order to spread mass education.

== Phonological features ==
The influence of the Bengali substrate is evident in Bangladeshi English vowel pronunciation, which neutralizes the English tense-lax distinction. For example, /iː/ and /ɪ/ merge into /i/, and /uː/ and /ʊ/ merge into /u/. Back and central vowels such as /ɑː/, /ʌ/, and /ɜː/ converge towards the low central /a/, and the schwa /ə/ is realized as /æ/. The trap-bath split, characteristic of Received Pronunciation, is absent. The TRAP, BATH, and often STRUT lexical sets merge into the /a/ phoneme. The monophthongization of English complex diphthongs occurs, similar to Bengali's simpler gliding types, resulting in /eɪ/ reducing to /e/, /əʊ/ to /o/, and /eə/ to /e/.

Some varieties maintain distinctions lost in Standard Southern British, such as that between pre-rhotic /oʊ/ and /ɔː/.

Deviations in the consonant inventory include the substitution of fricatives that are absent in Bengali. /θ/ and /ð/ are typically pronounced as the aspirated dentals /tʰ/ and /dʰ/, respectively, and /v/ emerges as a bilabial /b/ or /β/. The voiced alveolar /z/ phoneme is often affricated to /dʒ/, resulting in the pronunciation of words like "zoo" as /dʒuː/. Syllable-final /r/ is not elided, being pronounced as a trill or flap, and word-initial /r/ shows a retroflex tendency, close to the Bengali /ɽ/, thus producing an approximant sound.

At the suprasegmental level, rhythm adopts Bengali's syllable-timing; the durations of stressed and unstressed syllables become comparable, and these deviate from stress-timed norms, as measured in phonetic analyses by metrics such as ΔC and %V. In terms of intonation, a rising contour is used for yes-no questions and a falling contour for statements, and focus on any part is marked by high-low contours.

== Literature ==
Bangladeshi English literature (BEL) refers to the body of literary work written in the English language in Bangladesh and the Bangladeshi diaspora. In academia, it is also now referred to as Bangladeshi Writing in English (BWE). Early prominent Bengali writers in English include Ram Mohan Roy, Bankim Chandra Chatterjee, Begum Rokeya, and Rabindranath Tagore. In 1905, Begum Rokeya (1880–1932) wrote Sultana's Dream, one of the earliest examples of feminist science fiction. Modern writers of the Bangladeshi diaspora include Tahmima Anam, Neamat Imam, Monica Ali, and Zia Haider Rahman.

== Numbering system ==
The South Asian numbering system is preferred for digit grouping. When written in words, or when spoken, numbers less than 100,000/100 000 are expressed just as they are in Standard English. Numbers including and beyond 100,000 / 100 000 are expressed in a subset of the South Asian numbering system.

Thus, the following scale is used:

In digits	In words (long and short scales)	In words (South Asian system)
10	ten	
100	one hundred	
1,000	one thousand	
10,000	ten thousand	
100,000	one hundred thousand	one lakh
1,000,000	one million	ten lakh
10,000,000	ten million	one crore

== Grammar and words ==
The words used to speak in Bangladesh
American English	British English	Bangladeshi English
Counter-clockwise	Anti-clockwise	Anti-clockwise
License plate	Number plate	Licence plate/Number plate
Soccer	Football	Football
Sweet	Candy	Sweet/Candy (they mean different things in Bangladesh)
French fries	Chips	French fries
Chips	Crisps	Chips
Cookie	Biscuit	Biscuit
Store	Shop/retailer (formal)/store (if large)	Store
Pharmacy/drugstore	Chemist/pharmacist/pharmacy	Pharmacy
Trash Can	Dustbin	Dustbin
Movie	Film	Movie/Film
Movie Theater	Cinema	Theatre/Cinema Hall
Fall	Autumn	Autumn
Teller	Cashier	Cashier
Vacation	Holiday	Holiday/Vacation
(sports) Uniform	Kit	Uniform
Sports Field	Pitch/field	Pitch
Bathroom	toilet/loo/smallest room/cloakroom	Bathroom/Toilet
Mom, Mommy	Mum, Mummy	Mom, Mommy
Buddy	Mate/pal/chum/friend	Friend (formal and/or semiformal)/Mate (informal)
(telephone) Booth	(telephone) kiosk/box	(telephone) booth/Box
Police Officer	Policeman	Police Officer
Mail	Post	Mail
Zip Code	Postcode	Post Code
Mailman	Postman	Postman
Lawyer	Lawyer (/Solicitor/Barrister - depending on context)	Lawyer/Barrister
Cell Phone	Mobile Phone	Mobile Phone
Crosswalk	Zebra Crossing	Zebra Crossing
Garbage	Rubbish	Garbage (highly used)/Rubbish
Railroad	Railway	Railway
Overpass	Flyover	Flyover
Package	Parcel	Parcel
Resume	Curriculum Vitae (CV)	Resume/CV
Restroom	Public Toilet	Public Toilet
Shopping Cart	Trolley	Trolley
Apartment	Flat	Apartment/Flat
Mad	Angry	Angry
Elevator	Lift	Lift
Gas/Gasoline	Petrol	Petrol
Cab	Taxi	Taxi Cab
Flashlight	Torch	Torchlight
Airplane	Aeroplane	Airplane/Aeroplane
Sneakers	Trainers	Keds
Purse	Handbag	Purse/Handbag
Diaper	Nappy	Pamper
Parking lot	Car Park	Parking
First floor	Ground floor	Ground floor/First Floor (less common, used only if specifically mentioned)
Yard	Garden	Garden
Schedule	Timetable	Schedule (More official and common)/Timetable (less common)
Pants	Trousers	Pants/Trousers (depending on fabrics)
Line	Queue	Line
Basement	Basement/cellar	Underground
Subway	Underground	Subway
Highway	Motorway	Highway
Truck	Lorry	Truck/Lorry
Scotch tape	Sellotape	Scotch tape
Zero	Nil	Zero
Eggplant	Aubergine	Brinjal
Pitcher	Jug	Jug
Wrench	Spanner	Wrench
Dessert	Pudding	Pudding (specific item with same name) / Dessert (various kinds of sweet dishes or confections)
Eraser	Rubber	Rubber/Eraser
Faucet	Tap	Tap
Marked Crosswalk	Zebra Crossing	Zebra Crossing
Elementary School	Primary School	Primary School
Autopsy	Post-mortem	Post-mortem/Autopsy
Push-up	Press-up	Push-up
Couch	Sofa	Sofa
Corn	Maize	Corn
Curly Braces	Curly Brackets	Curly Braces
Apron	Pinny/Pinafore	Apron

== See also ==
- Bengal
- Commonwealth English
- Languages of Bangladesh
- Languages of India
- Bengali people
- Bangladeshi people
- Bengali alphabet
- South Asian English
- Indian English
- Pakistani English
