= Momo (food) =

Nepalese and Tibetan dumpling

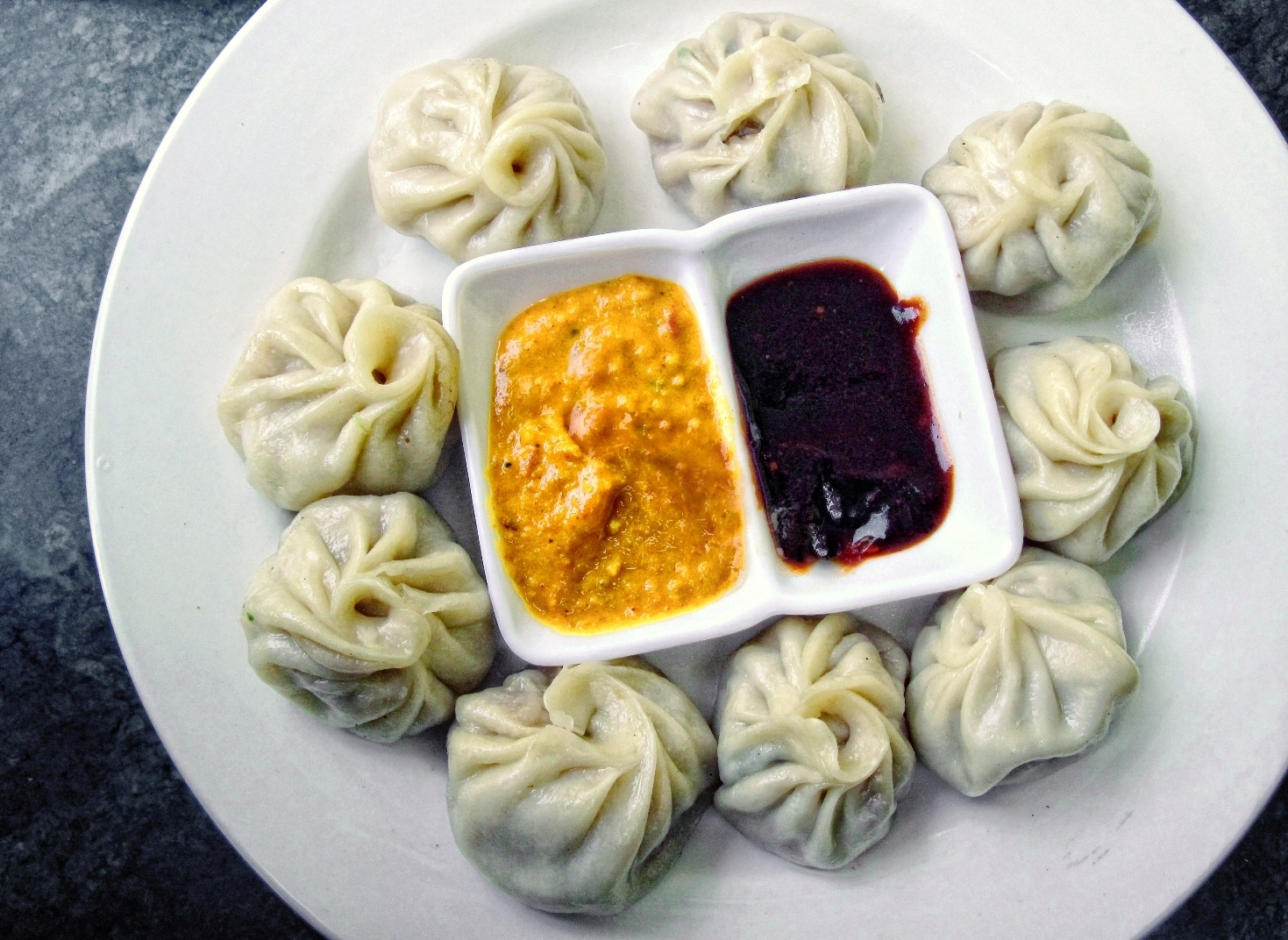
- A typical serving of momos, with sesame sauce and ginger chilli pickle
- Alternative names: Mamacha (Newar)
- Place of origin: Nepal; Tibet
- Associated cuisine: Nepalese cuisine; Tibetan cuisine
- Main ingredients: White-flour-and-water dough, meat, vegetables
- Variations: Chicken momo; Chilli momo; Fried momo; Jhol momo; Kothey momo; Mutton momo; Open momo; Pork momo; Steamed momo; Vegetable momo; Yak momo
- Similar dishes: Baozi; buuz; gyōza; guotie; jiaozi; mandu; manti; mantou; xiaolongbao

Momos (Note: Some speakers of Nepalese English, or South Asian English in general, use "momo" as both the singular and plural form; "momo" is also listed as a standard English plural.) are a type of steamed, filled dumpling in Nepalese and Tibetan cuisine, also popular in neighbouring Bangladesh, Bhutan, and India. They are usually served with a dipping sauce known as achar or chutney. They can also be served in soup, such as jhol momo or mokthuk.

== Names ==
In Nepali, they are called मम (mama, IPA: [mʌmʌ]) as well as मःम (ma:ma), मःमः (ma:ma:), ममः (mama:), मोमो (momo), मोःमो (mo:mo), मोःमोः (mo:mo:), मोमोः (momo:), and ममो (mamo). In the Newar language, they are known as ममचा (mamacha). In Tibetan, they are called མོག་མོག (mog mog, IPA: [mo˩˨.mo˥˨]).

The Tibetan word may have been borrowed from the Chinese momo (馍馍), a name traditionally used in northwestern Chinese dialects for steamed wheat buns and bread. The word mo (馍) itself means wheat-flour food products or mantou (馒头)—steamed buns. Historically, Chinese names for steamed buns did not distinguish between those with or without fillings until the term baozi (包子) emerged during the Song dynasty, between the 10th and 13th centuries. However, in eastern regions of China, such as Jiangsu and Shanghai, mantou continues to carry both meanings. The history of dumplings in China shows that they were popular during the Northern and Southern dynasties (420–589 AD). Dumplings dated to between 499 AD and 640 AD have been found in the Astana Cemetery in northwestern China.

== Origin ==
One legend states that the 7th-century Nepali princess Bhrikuti, who introduced Buddhism to Tibet, also introduced momos there. Historically speaking, it is generally believed that dumplings were brought from China by the Mongols in the 13th century. Debate exists about whether momos spread from the Kathmandu Valley of Nepal to Tibet or the other way around. As the dish was initially popular among the Newar community, one prevalent belief is that traveling Nepali Newar merchants took the recipe from Tibet, where they traded, and brought it to Nepal.

After arriving in the Indo-Gangetic Plains, the most common meat in momos was chicken, and vegetable momos were introduced to feed the large population of vegetarian Hindus. A large number of Tibetans emigrated to India following the 1959 Tibetan uprising, bringing their recipes for momos with them.

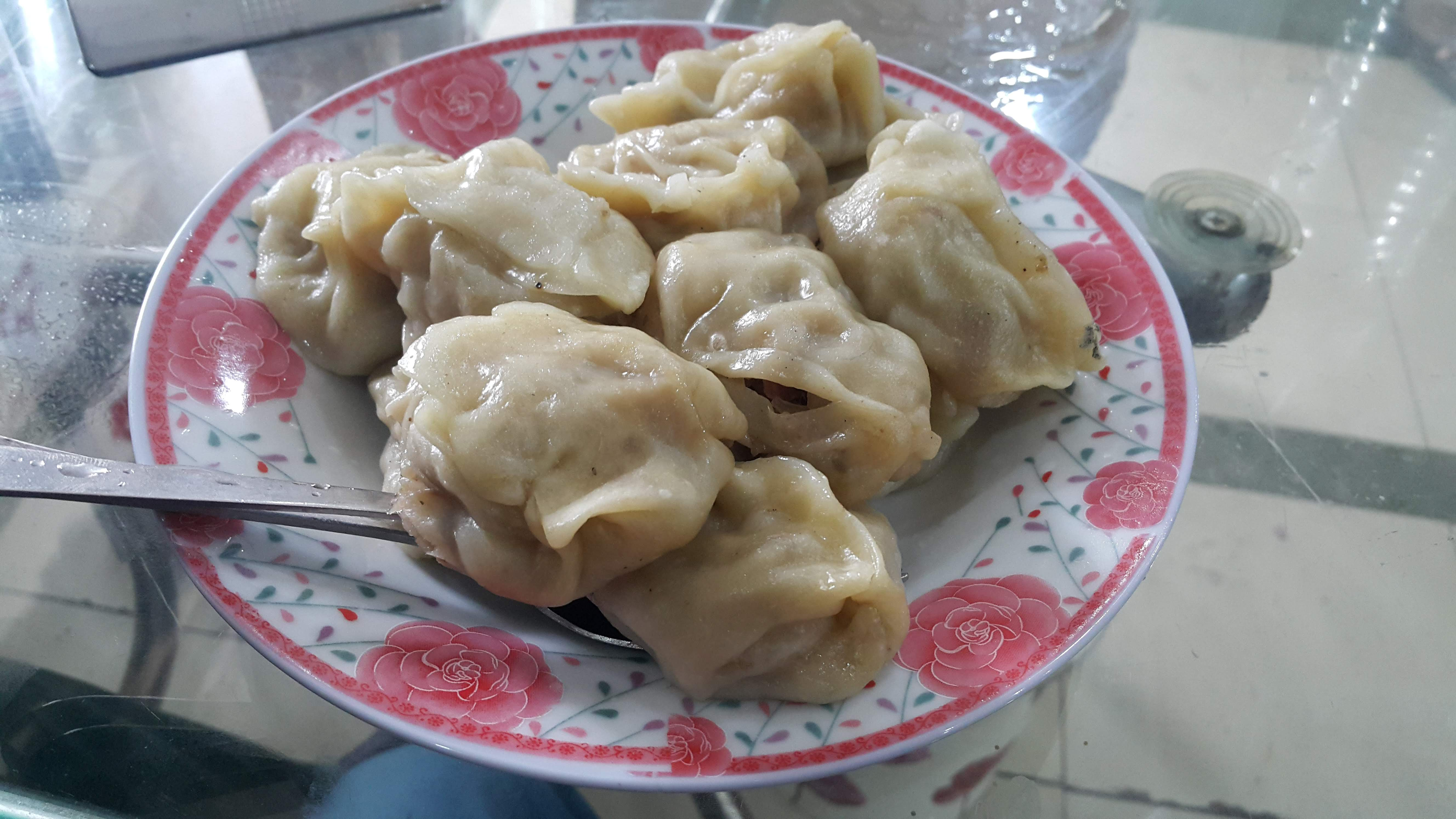
Momos from Gilgit in Kashmir

== Preparation ==
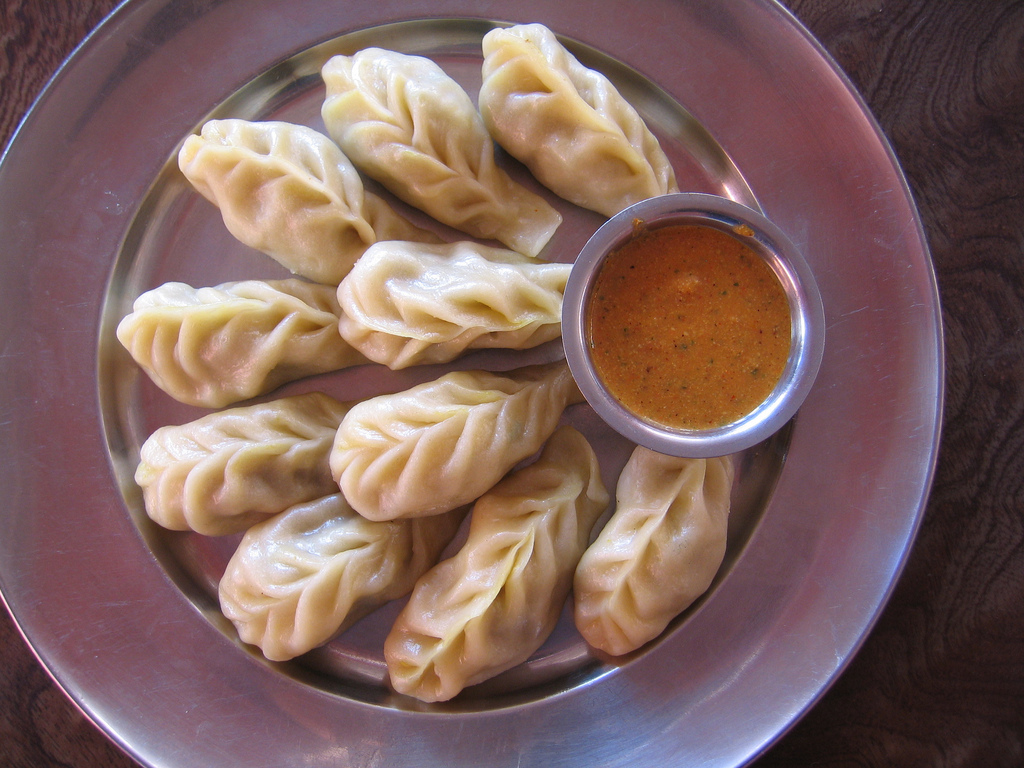
A plate of momos from Nepal

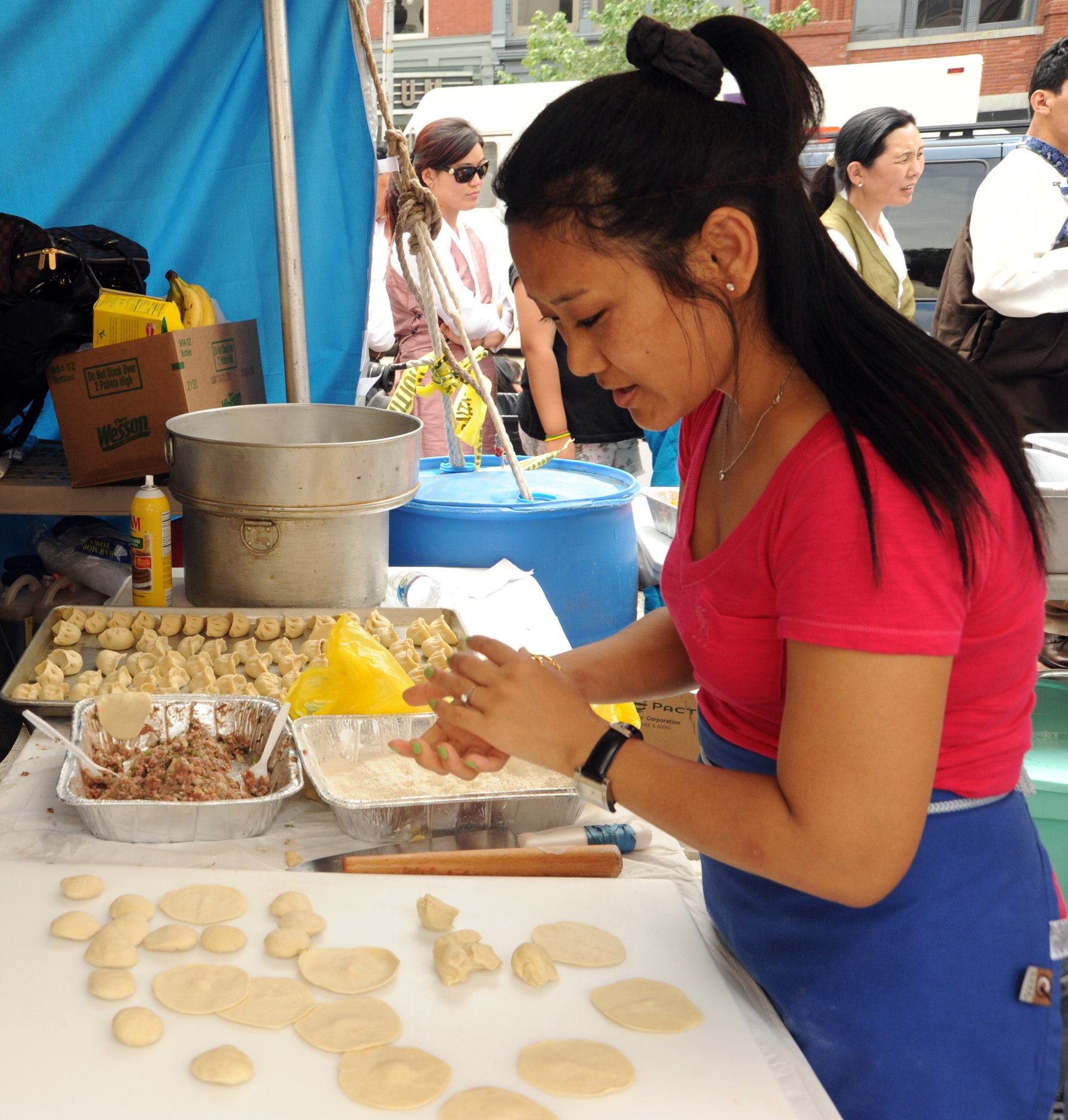
A Tibetan woman making momos in Washington, D.C., US

The earliest Tibetan dumplings were made of highland barley flour as the outer covering, and beef and mutton as the filling. Nowadays, a simple white-flour-and-water dough is preferred to make the outer covering of momos. Sometimes, a little yeast or baking soda is added to give a more doughy texture to the finished product.

Traditionally, momos are prepared with ground/minced meat, potatoes, and leek filling. Nowadays, the fillings have become more elaborate, and momos are prepared with virtually any combination of ground meat, vegetables, tofu, mushrooms, paneer cheese, soft chhurpi cheese, and vegetable and meat combinations.

- Meat: Different types of meat fillings are popular in different regions. In Nepal, Tibet, Sikkim, and Bhutan, common meat fillings include pork, chicken, goat, and water buffalo. In the Himalayan regions of Nepal and India, lamb and yak meat are more common. Minced meat is combined with any or all of the following: onions/shallots, garlic, ginger, and cilantro/coriander. Some people also add finely puréed tomatoes and soy sauce.
- Vegetables: Finely chopped cabbage, carrot, soy granules, potato, flat bean, or chayote are used as fillings in Nepal.
- Cheese: Usually fresh paneer or traditional soft chhurpi is used. This variety is common in Eastern Nepal.
- Khoa: Momos filled with milk solids mixed with sugar are popular as a dessert in the Kathmandu Valley.

The dough is rolled into small circular flat pieces. The filling is enclosed in the circular dough cover, either in a round pocket or a half-moon or crescent shape. Fatty meat is preferred, because it produces flavourful, juicy momos. A little oil is sometimes added to the lean ground/minced meat to keep the filling moist. The dumplings are then cooked by steaming over a soup (either a stock based on bones or vegetables) in a momo-making utensil called mucktoo. Momos may also be pan-fried or deep-fried after being steamed.

== Variations ==
Momos are traditionally steamed but can also be deep-fried or pan-fried and cooked in soup. They are usually served with chilli garlic sauce and pickled daikon in Tibet. In Nepal, popular dipping sauces include tomato-based chutneys or sesame or peanut or soybean-based sauces called achar. Sauces can be thick or thin in consistency, depending on the eatery.

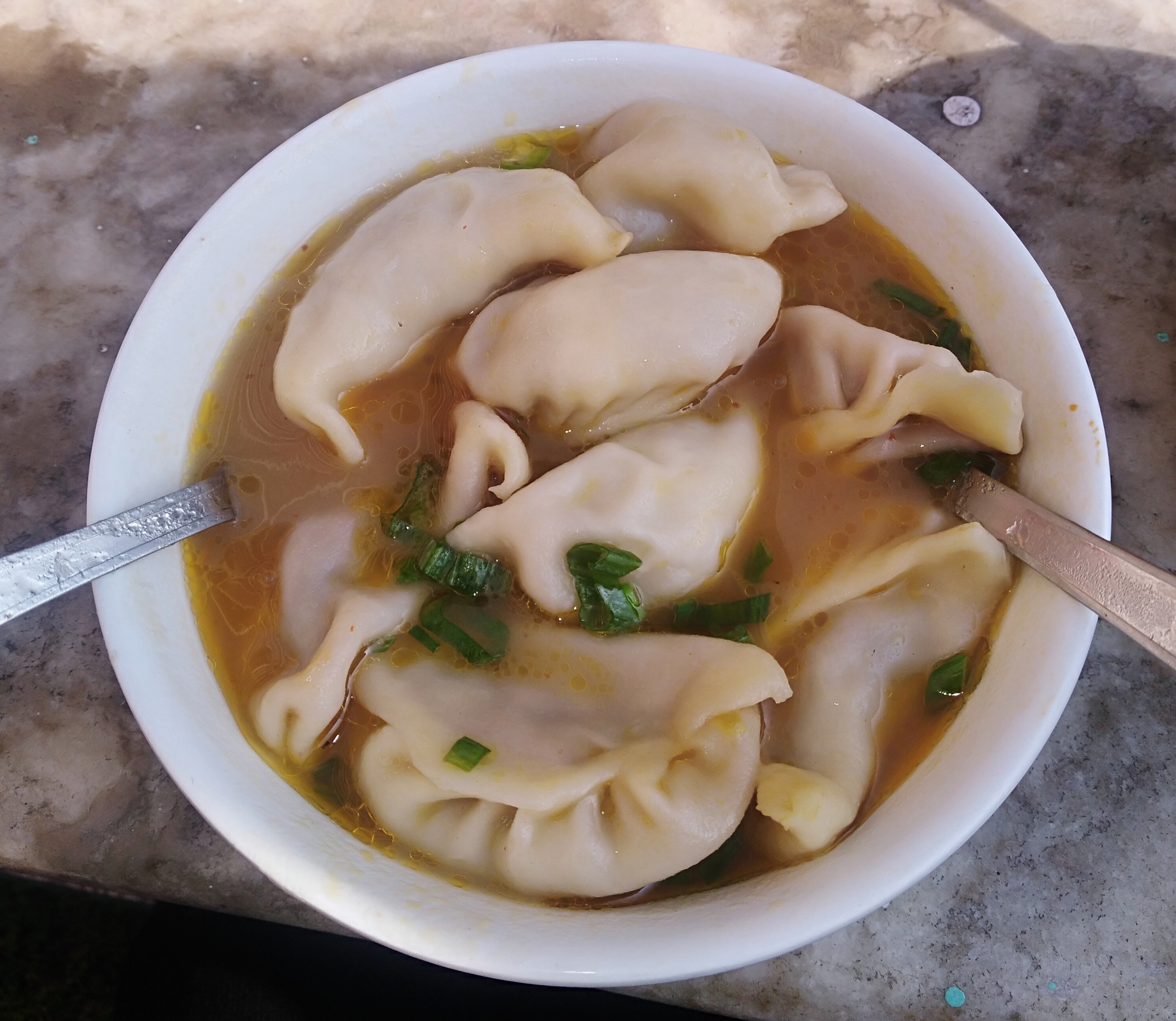
Jhol momo

Momos may also be served in a thin sauce or broth, known as jhol. Jhol momo (Nepali: झोल मोमो) is a Nepali preparation in which momos are served in a thin, spiced jhol rather than with a separate dipping achar. The composition of the jhol varies: it may be sesame- or tomato-based, while street-style versions may derive their body from roasted soybeans, peanuts, and sesame seeds and be flavoured with mustard oil, onion, garlic, ginger, green chillies, coriander, and a souring ingredient such as lapsi or lime juice. The jhol is typically thin enough to pour freely over the momos, while retaining enough body to cling lightly to them. Mokthuk, from Tibet, is a variation of the thukpa soup, using small momos.

Other variations of momos include:

- C-momo, steamed or fried, then served in chili sauce.
- Dhapu momo, from Chinese da bao (大包), or "big bun", also known as "Tibetan momo", a Nepali dumpling that is typically larger and flatter than other versions. This was possibly introduced to Nepal via two routes. One was through Myanmar, along the eastern Himalayas, and the other was by the Chinese who immigrated to Kolkata, India, one or two hundred years ago.
- Gonga momo (Tibetan: སྒོ་ང་མོག་མོག, Wylie: sgo nga mog mog), a wheat and egg fried dough dumpling filled with meat paste.
- Green momo, a steamed vegetarian dumpling stuffed with vegetables, cabbage, and green beans.
- Hoentay, a Bhutanese dumpling made with a buckwheat dough wrapper mixed with spinach and cheese.
- Kothey momo, from Chinese guotie (锅贴), a pan-fried version of the momo. The dumpling is filled with meat as well as vegetables and spices. It is first steamed, then fried and served in dipping sauce.
- Open momo, another Nepali variant with open holes on the top that can be used to add sauces and spices.
- Sadheko momo, a momo salad with onions and tomatoes, herbs, and spices.
- Shoko momo (Tibetan: ཞོག་ཁོག་མོག་མོག, Wylie: zhog khog mog mog), a Tibetan variant that is prepared using mashed potatoes with dough, shaped into balls, with a minced-meat filling, served with bread crumbs.
- Tingmo (Tibetan: ཀྲིན་མོག, Wylie: krin mog), a type of steamed bread made from flour, yeast, and water. Tingmo is a soft and fluffy bread served with savoury dishes such as stews or curries. Unlike other versions of momos, tingmo does not contain any type of filling.
- Shamo (Tibetan: ཤ་མོག, Wylie: sha mog), a Tibetan dumpling stuffed with beef or mutton.

== Gallery ==
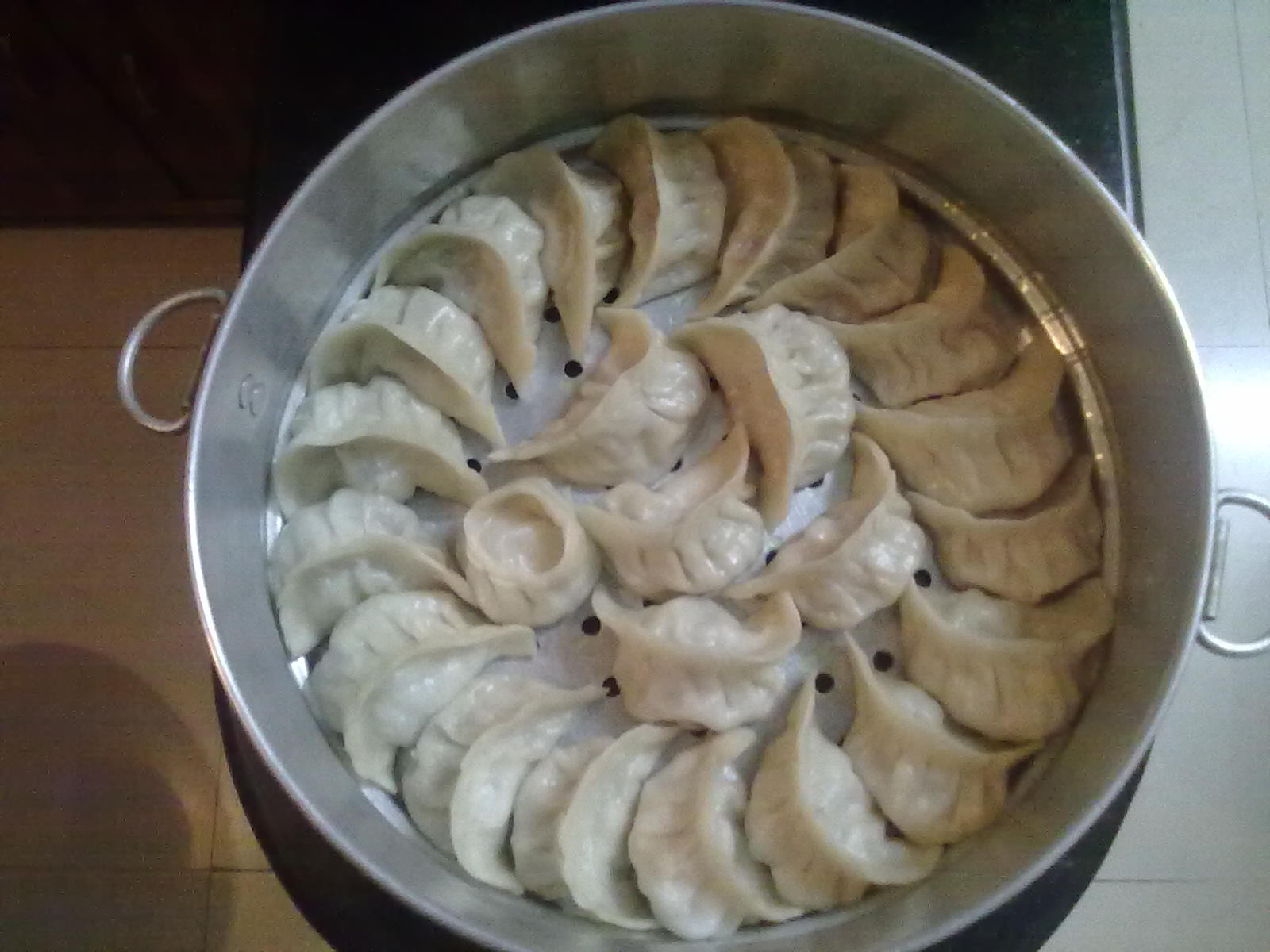
Momos in a mucktoo in Kathmandu, Nepal

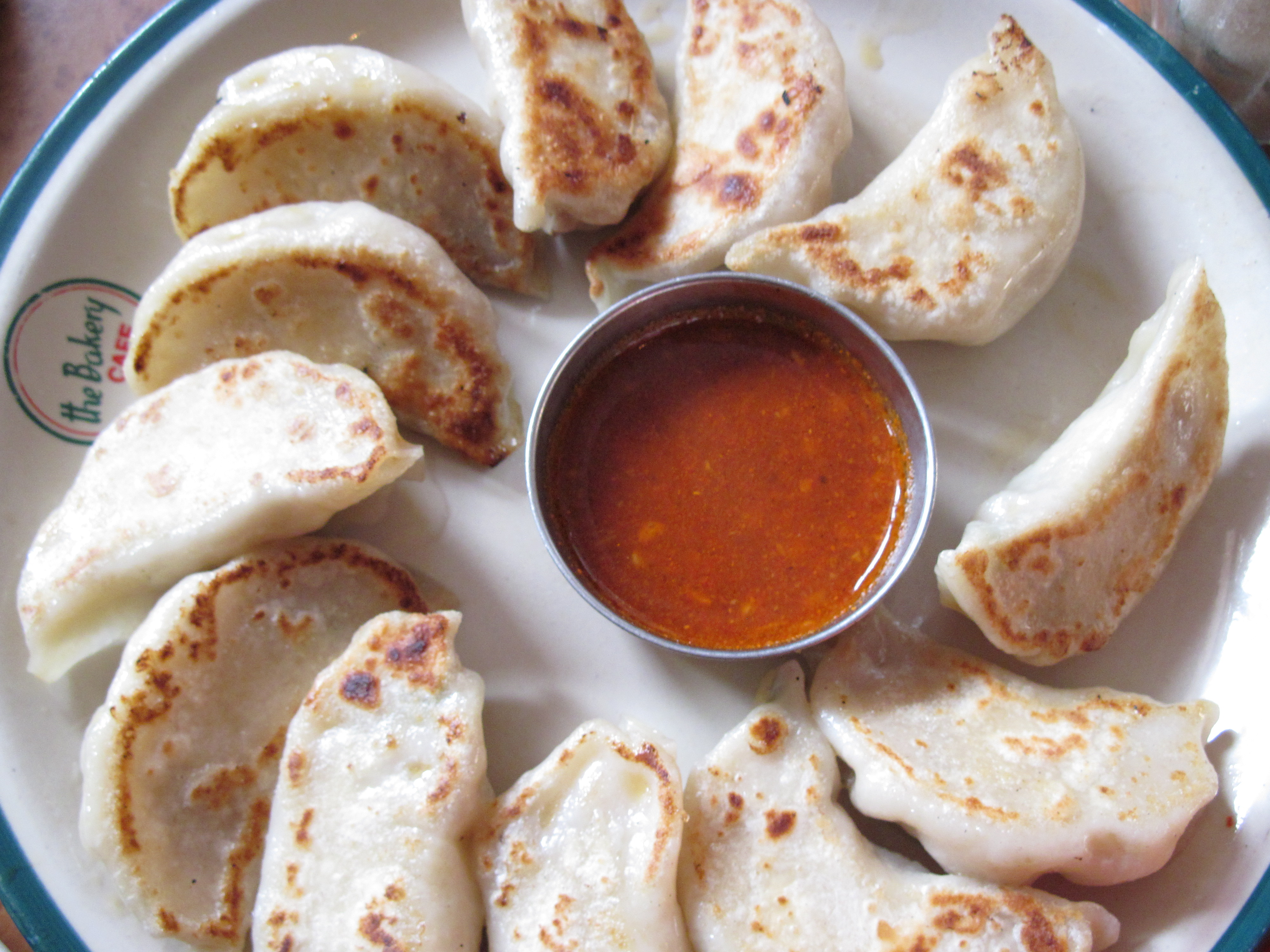
Kothey, a pan-fried momo variety from Nepal

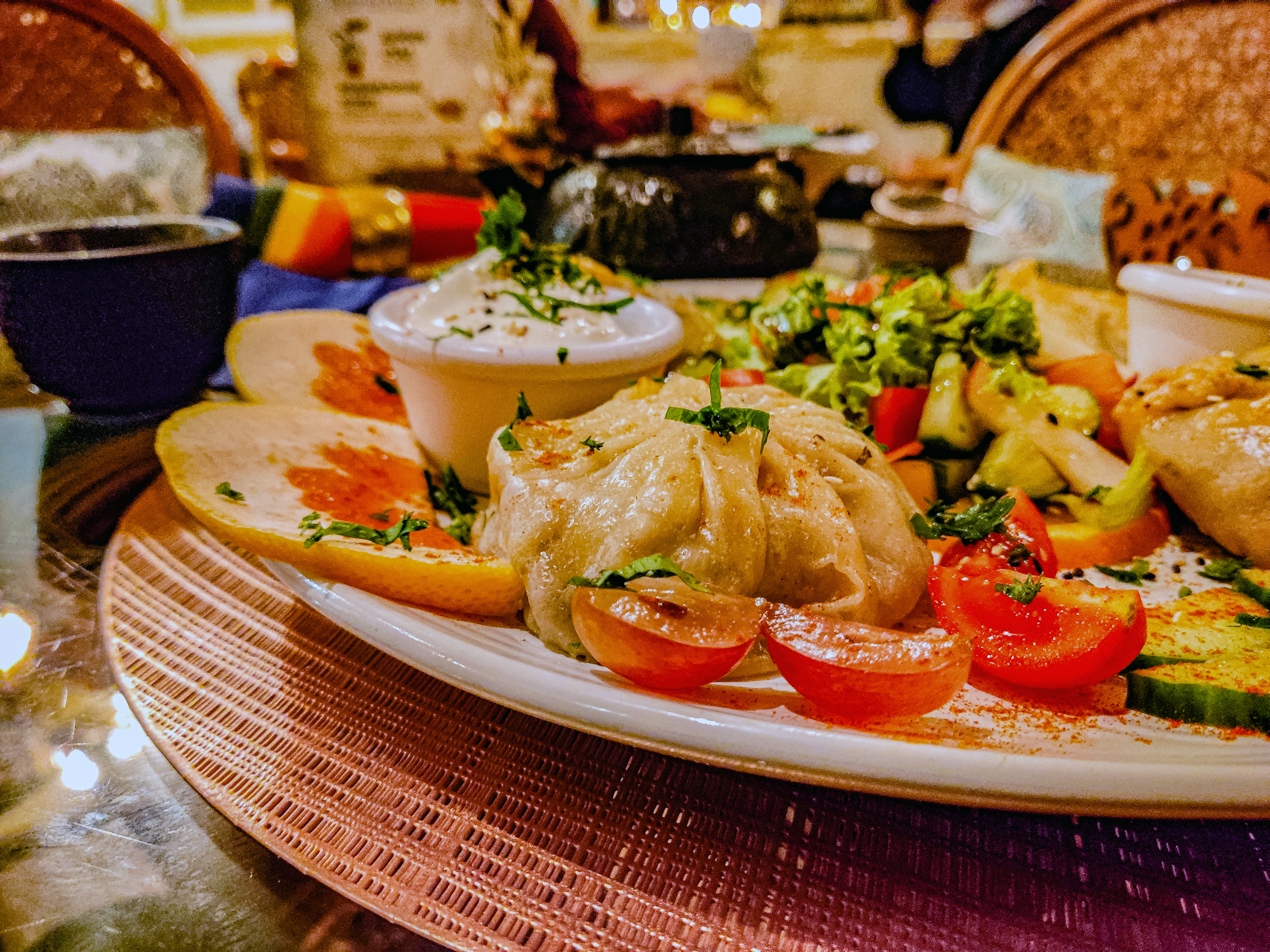
Momos served in a restaurant in St Petersburg, Russia

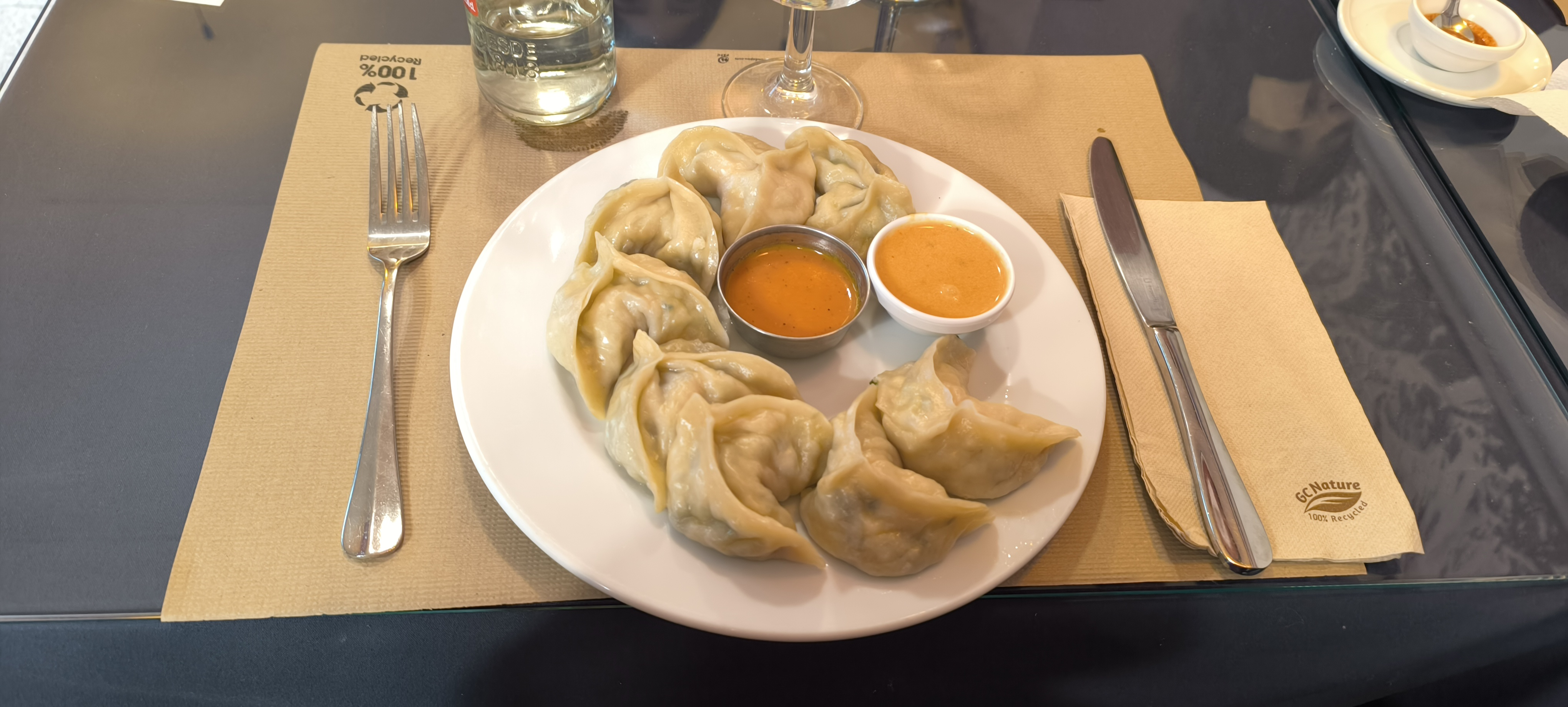
Momos served in a restaurant in Barcelona, Spain

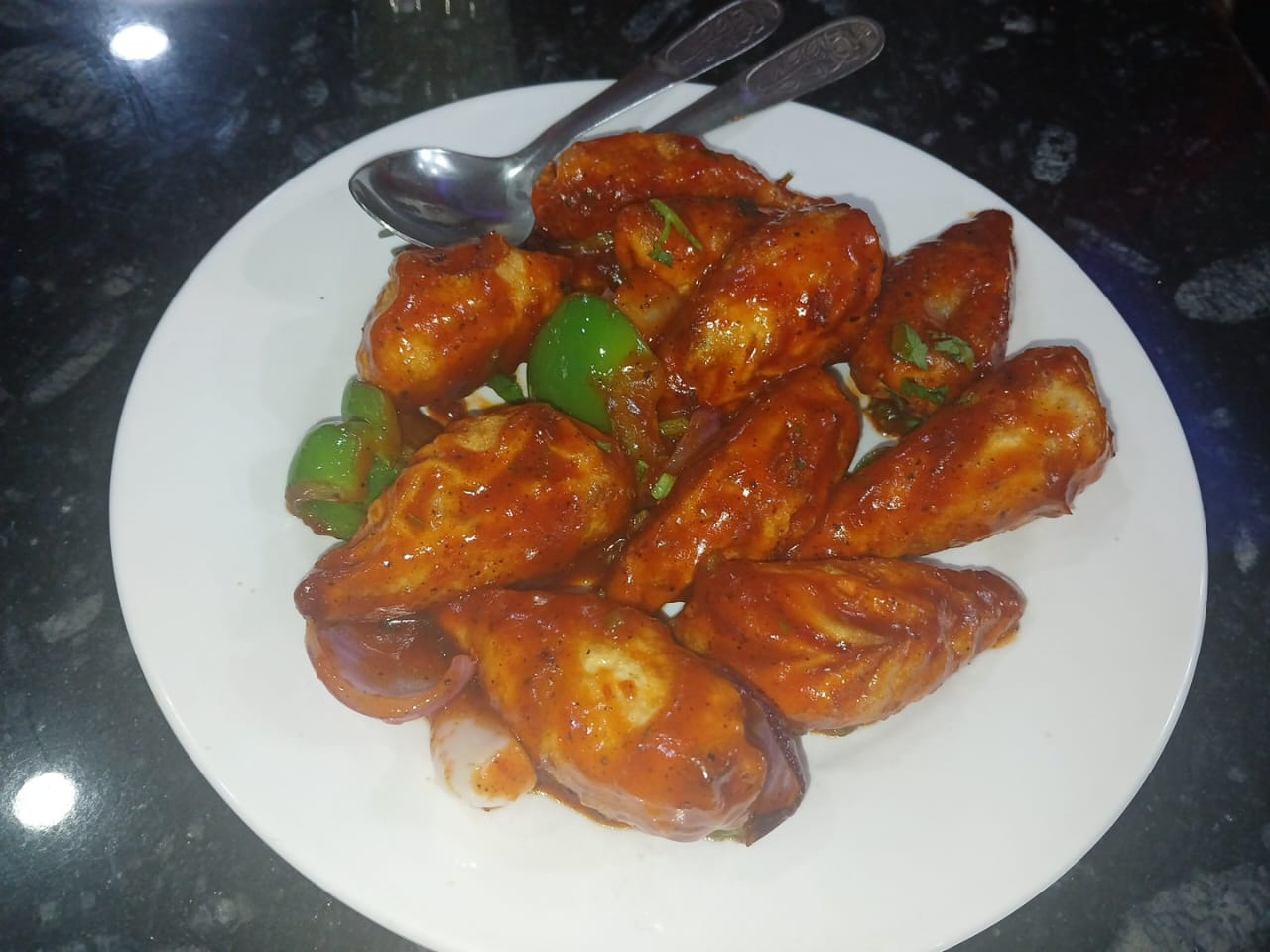
C-Momo is a modern, spicy variation of the traditional momo.

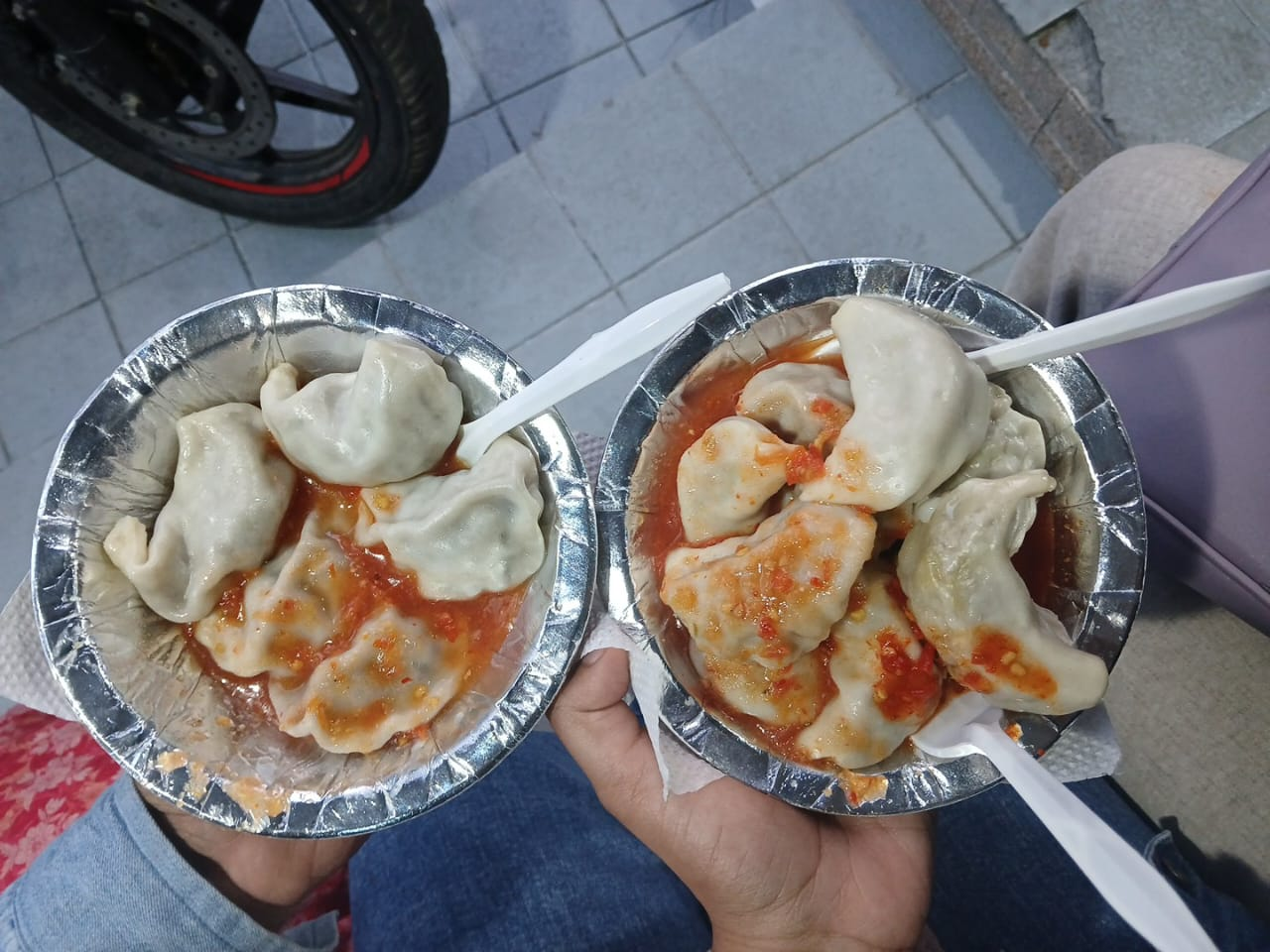
Steamed momo is the most traditional and popular form of Nepalese dumpling.

== See also ==
- List of dumplings
- Tibetan diaspora
