= Charu (coffee shop) =

Coffee shop in Chengdu, China

Charu (Tibetan: ཆ་རུ། Chinese: 迦入空间) is coffee shop, event center, Tibetan handicrafts shop and working space in Chengdu, China. It is operated by Tibetan nomads.

It purveys various tea and coffee beverages, such as yak milk coffee, yak yogurt and some foods, including momo dumplings. Charu space is mentioned as Chengdu travel destiny on Wall Street Journal.

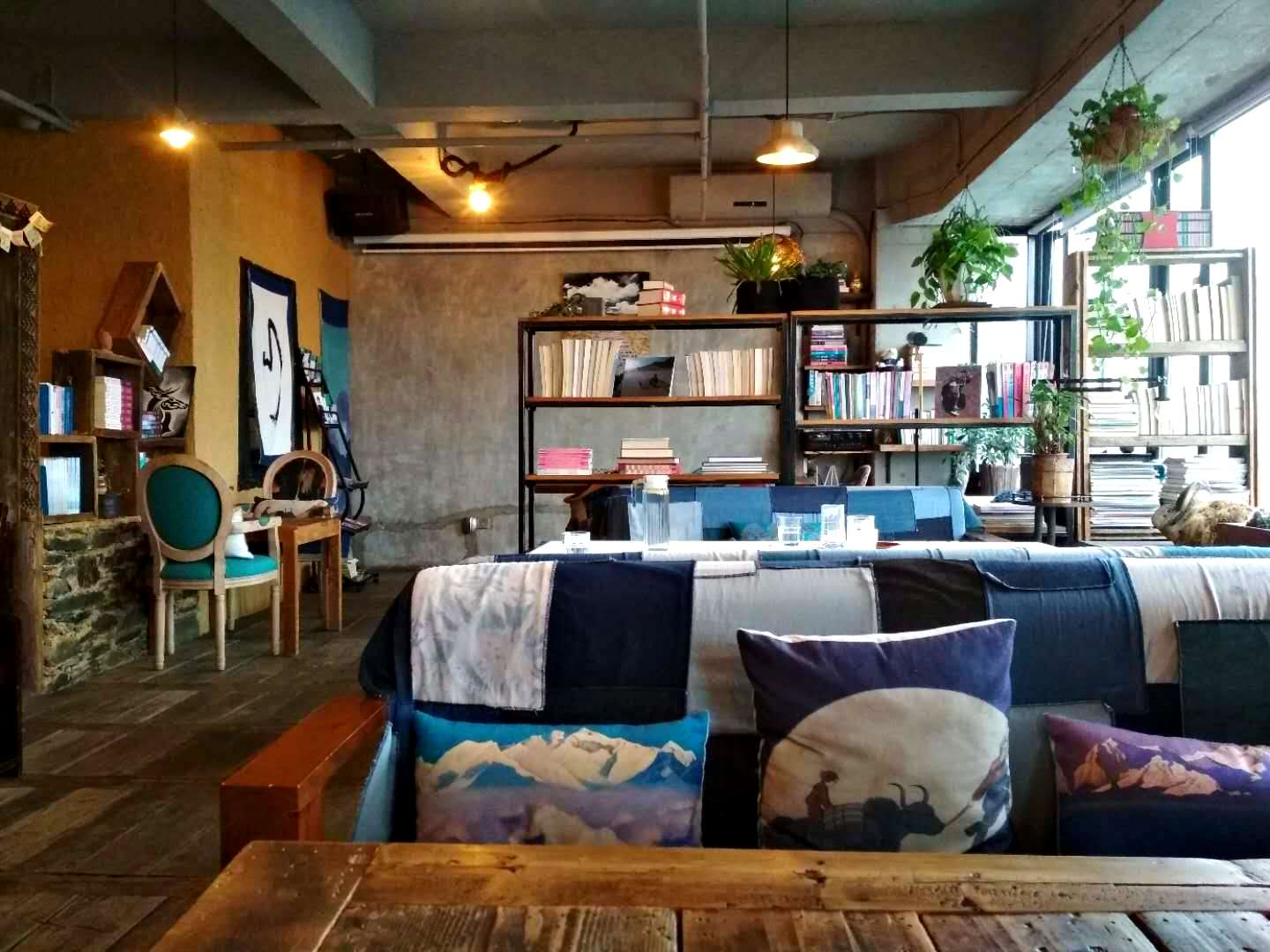
Interior of Charu Space
