= Maldivian English =

English dialect spoken in the Maldives

- Native to: Maldives
- Region: South Asia
- Language family: Indo-European: Germanic; West Germanic; Ingvaeonic; Anglo-Frisian; Anglic; English; British English; South Asian English; Maldivian English
- Early forms: Proto-Indo-European: Proto-Germanic; Proto-English; Old English; Middle English; Early Modern English; Modern English
- Writing system: Latin

Language codes
- ISO 639-3: –
- IETF: en-MV

Maldivian English is an English dialect spoken in the Maldives, where it is predominantly used as a second language.

== See also ==
- Commonwealth English
