= Lakh =

100,000 in the Indian numbering system

A lakh (/læk, lɑːk/; abbreviated L; sometimes written lac) is a unit in the Indian numbering system equal to one hundred thousand (100,000; scientific notation: 10^{5}). In the Indian 2, 2, 3 convention of digit grouping, it is written as 1,00,000. For example, in India, 150,000 rupees becomes 1.5 lakh rupees, written as ₹1,50,000 or INR 1,50,000.

It is widely used both in official and other contexts in Bangladesh, Bhutan, India, Myanmar, Nepal, Pakistan, and Sri Lanka. It is often used in Bangladeshi, Indian, Pakistani, and Sri Lankan English.

== Usage ==
In Indian English, the word is used both as an attributive and non-attributive noun with either an unmarked or marked ("-s") plural, respectively. For example: "1 lakh people"; "lakhs of people"; "20 lakh rupees"; "lakhs of rupees". In the abbreviated form, usage such as "₹5L" or "₹5 lac" (for "5 lakh rupees") is common. In this system of numeration, 100 lakh is called one crore and is equal to 10 million.

Formal written publications in English in India tend to use lakh and crore for Indian currency and Western numbering for foreign currencies, such as dollars and pounds.

=== Silver market ===
The term is also used in the pricing of silver on the international precious metals market, where one lakh equals 100,000 troy ounces (3,110 kilograms) of silver.

== Etymology and regional variants ==
The modern word lakh derives from Sanskrit: लक्ष, romanized: lakṣa, originally denoting "mark, target, stake in gambling", but also used as the numeral for "100,000" in Gupta-era Classical Sanskrit (Yājñavalkya Smṛti, Harivaṃśa). The cognate Pali word lakkha has the same range of senses, including "100,000".

Outside South Asia, the Sanskrit word was borrowed into several languages. In some of these, it came to denote a smaller number: in Malay-Indonesian, and a number of Philippine languages, laksa means 10,000 rather than 100,000 (the former denoted 100,000 with keti < koti instead).

=== By language ===
==== South Asia ====
- Assamese: লক্ষ (lakṣa), or লাখ (lākh)
- Bengali: natively (tadbhava) লাখ (lākh), though some use the ardha-tatsama লক্ষ (lakṣa)
- Bhojpuri: लाख (lākh)
- Bishnupriya Manipuri: লাখ (lākha)
- Dhivehi: ލައްކަ (lakka)
- Gujarati: લાખ (lākh)
- Hindustani: Hindi लाख (lākh); Urdu لاکھ (lākh)
- Kannada: ಲಕ್ಷ (lakṣa)
- Kashmiri: لَچھ (lachh)
- Khasi: lak
- Konkani: लाख (lākh)
- Maithili: लाख (lākh)
- Malayalam: ലക്ഷം (lakṣaṁ)
- Marathi: लाख (lākh) or लक्ष (lakṣa)
- Meitei: ꯂꯥꯛ (lāk)
- Nepali: लाख (lākh)
- Odia: ଲକ୍ଷ (lakṣa)
- Pali (historical): lakkha
- Punjabi: Gurmukhi ਲੱਖ (lakkh); Shahmukhi لکھ (lakkh)
- Sanskrit: लक्ष (lakṣa)
- Sindhi: لک (lakh)
- Sinhala: ලක්ෂය (lakṣaya)
- Tamil: இலட்சம் (ilaṭcam), also லட்சம் (laṭcam)
- Telugu: లక్ష (lakṣa)

==== Outside South Asia ====
The terms below are borrowings or translations of Sanskrit lakṣa.

- Central Subanen: laksa', traditionally "innumerable" but now used for 10,000
- Chinese: 洛叉 (luòchā), a transcription of lakṣa used in Buddhist texts
- Japanese: 洛叉 (rakusha), also 落沙
- Malay (including modern Malaysian and Indonesian variants): لقسا laksa, denoting 10,000 rather than 100,000
- Tagalog: laksâ, denoting 10,000 rather than 100,000
- Tibetan: འབུམ ('bum), the traditional Tibetan word for 100,000 used to translate Sanskrit lakṣa

== See also ==
- Crore (100 lakh, or 10 million)
- English numerals
- Myriad
- Names of large numbers
