= English in the Commonwealth of Nations =

The English language is widely used in the Commonwealth, having largely been inherited through British colonisation. Varieties of English used in Commonwealth countries mostly share a set of word spellings, punctuation rules and grammatical conventions. The language forms part of the association's common culture and serves as the medium of intra-Commonwealth relations. As a lingua franca, it enables communication where a plurality of mother tongues exist.

The term Commonwealth English is sometimes used to refer to the language as practised in the Commonwealth, most often interchangeably with British English. It is also used to distinguish between British English and that in the rest of the Commonwealth, and more broadly to refer to varieties of the language outside of Britain and the United States of America.

Many regions have developed their own local varieties of English. Its official status varies: in Bangladesh, it lacks any but is widely used; in India, it is co-official with Hindi; in Namibia, it is the sole official language. Written English in current and former countries of the Commonwealth generally favours British English spelling, grammar and orthography as opposed to that of American English, with some exceptions, particularly in Canada and to a lesser extent in Australia.

== Native varieties ==
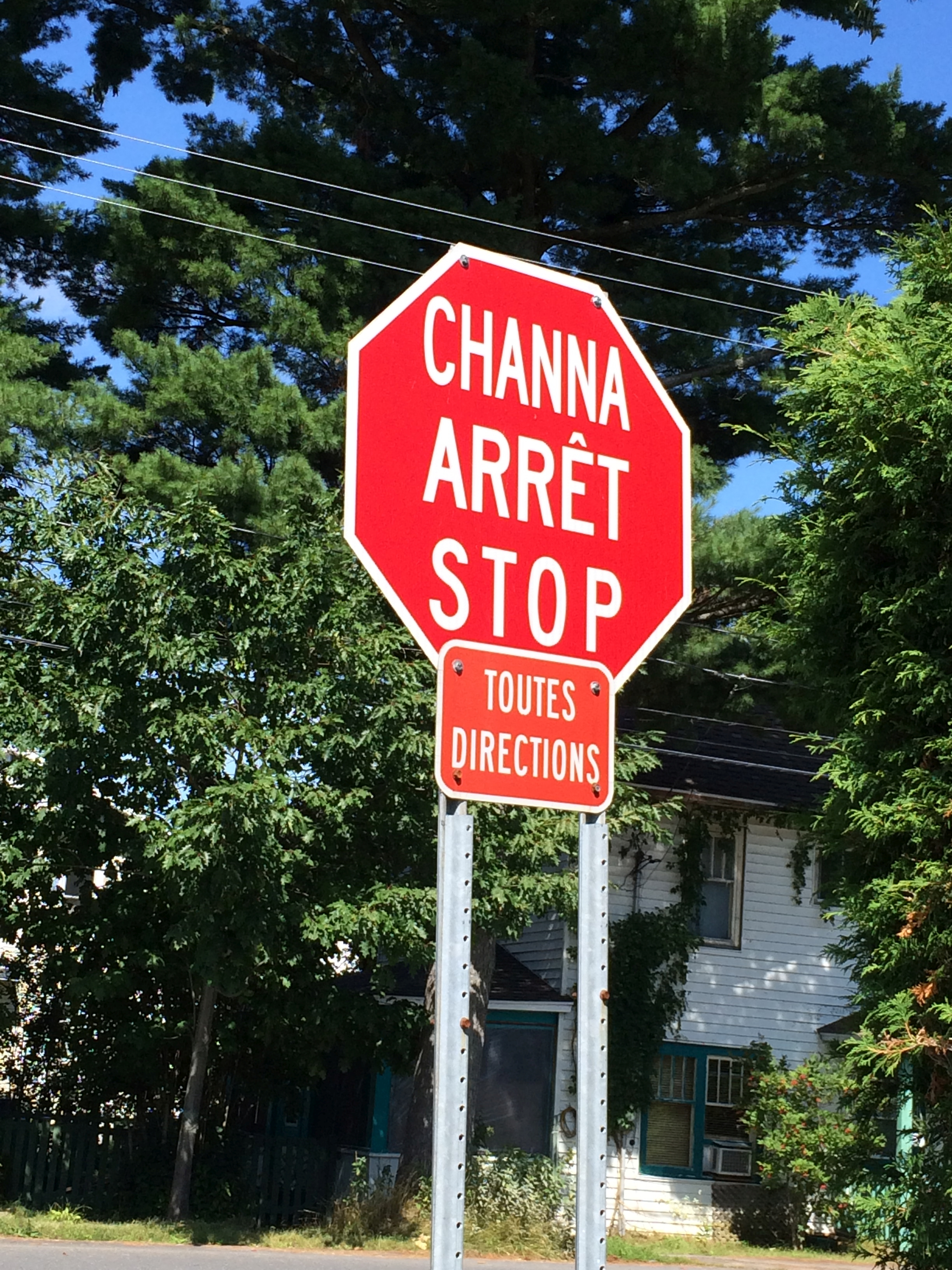
Multilingual stop sign on a First Nations reserve in Canada, featuring the Abenaki, French and English languages

Southern Hemisphere native varieties of English began to develop during the 18th century, with the colonisation of Australasia and South Africa. Australian English and New Zealand English are closely related to each other and share some similarities with South African English. Nonetheless, South African English has unique influences from indigenous African languages, and Dutch influences inherited alongside the evolution of Afrikaans, while New Zealand English has a lot of influences from the Māori language.

Canadian English contains elements of British English and American English, as well as many Canadianisms and some French influences. It is the product of several waves of immigration and settlement, from Britain, Ireland, France, the United States, and around the world, over a period of more than two centuries.

In many Commonwealth countries, there exists a relatively small native Anglophone minority amongst a larger population who speak English as a second language; Anglo-Indians speak English as their mother tongue, but it is not the first language of most Indians.

=== Africa ===
In addition to South Africa, a number of Commonwealth countries in Africa have native varieties of English. A community of native English speakers exists in Zimbabwe; the country's dialect bears features of British English, South African English and other Southern Hemisphere varieties of Commonwealth English. Also in Southern Africa and with historical influence from South Africa, Namibia and Botswana have their own dialects, with smaller native English-speaking populations. The same is true of Kenya and Uganda in East Africa.

=== Caribbean ===
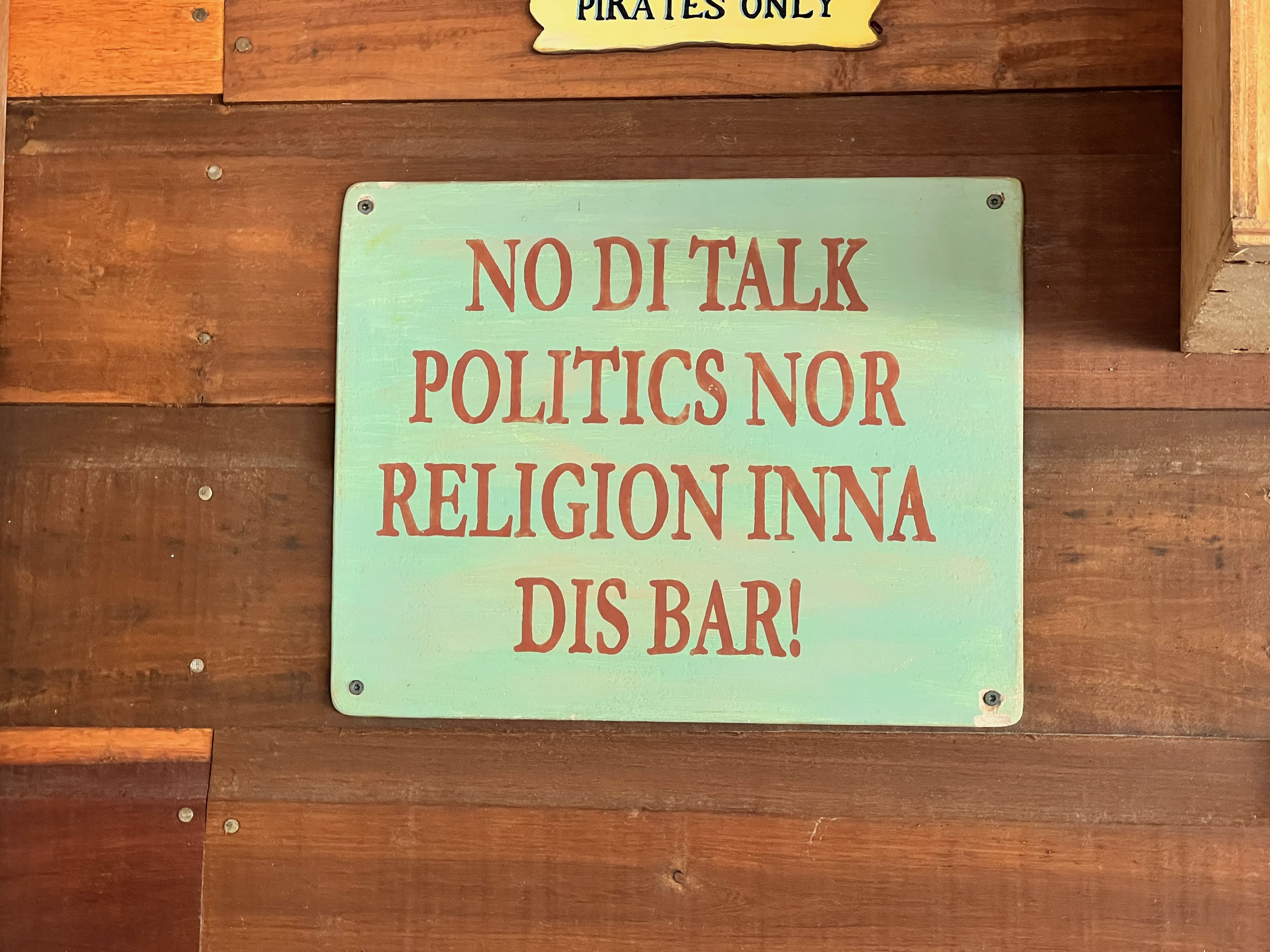
Sign in Belizean Creole, an English-based creole language

Caribbean English is drawn from British English and West African languages. It is influenced by constant contact with English-based Creoles. There is considerable influence from Hindustani and other South Asian languages in countries with language Indian populations, including Trinidad and Tobago, and Guyana. Jamaican English and Barbadian English bear influences of Irish English.

== Non-native varieties ==
Second-language varieties of English in Africa and Asia have often undergone "indigenisation"; that is, each English-speaking community has developed (or is in the process of developing) its own standards of usage, often under the influence of local languages. These dialects are sometimes referred to as New Englishes; most of them inherited non-rhoticity from Southern British English.

=== Africa ===
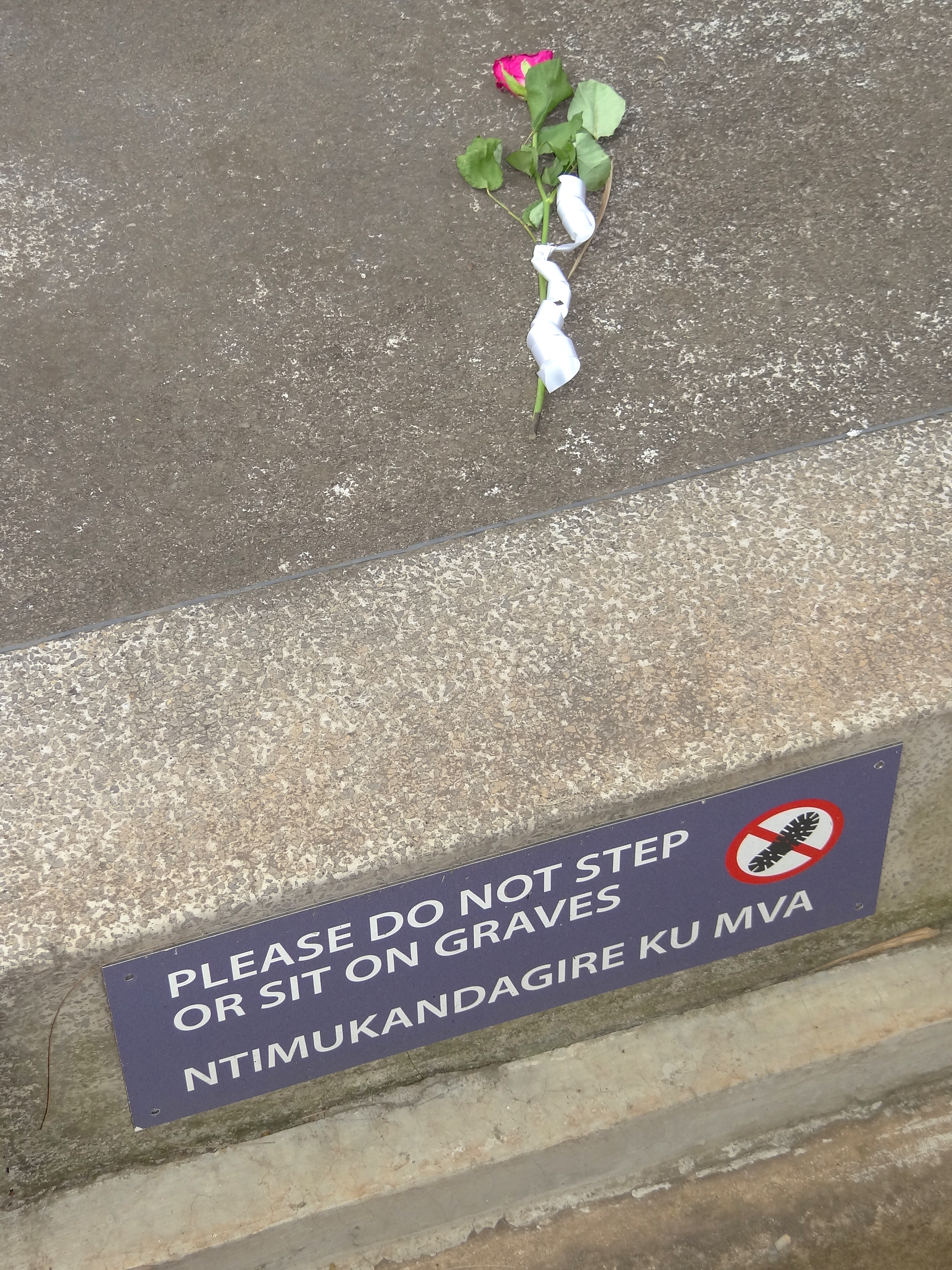
English and Kinyarwanda text in Kigali, Rwanda. Rwanda, a Commonwealth country, was not previously part of the British Empire.

In the Commonwealth countries of West Africa, there are national varieties of English in Nigeria, Ghana, Sierra Leone, Cameroon and the Gambia.

In East Africa, national varieties of English are spoken in Kenya, Rwanda, Uganda, and Tanzania. The modern development of English in Rwanda is closely associated with the post-1994 period. The return of Rwandans who had lived for extended periods in neighbouring countries, particularly Uganda, increased the presence of English in public and institutional life, and provided an important regional input for local English usage. English subsequently expanded in domains such as education and administration. Rwanda became a Commonwealth country in 2009.

Prior to Togo's admission to the Commonwealth in 2022, foreign minister Robert Dussey said that he expected Commonwealth membership to provide opportunities for Togolese citizens to learn English.

=== Asia ===
==== Hong Kong ====
Hong Kong ceased to be part of the Commonwealth by virtue of being a British territory in 1997. Nonetheless, the English language there still enjoys official status.

==== Indian subcontinent ====
English was introduced to the subcontinent by the British Raj. India has the largest English-speaking population in the Commonwealth, although comparatively very few speakers of Indian English are first-language speakers. The same is true of English spoken in other parts of South Asia, including Maldivian English, Pakistani English, Sri Lankan English, Bangladeshi English and Myanmar English; though Myanmar or Burma is not a Commonwealth country, English is the mother tongue of the Anglo-Burmese population. South Asian English is fairly homogeneous across the subcontinent, though there are some differences based on various regional factors.

==== Malay Archipelago ====
Southeast Asian English includes Singapore English, Malaysian English, and Brunei English as well as other varieties in non-Commonwealth countries (such as Indonesian English); it is not only the result of British colonisation but also American colonisation (as in the case of the Philippines) and globalisation. It has interacted with diverse local ecologies, shaping its form, function and status in the region.

== See also ==
- EF English Proficiency Index
- English-speaking world
