= Indian numbering system =

Indian convention of naming large numbers

The Indian numbering system is used in Bangladesh, India, Nepal, Pakistan, and Sri Lanka to express large numbers, which differs from the International System of Units. Commonly used quantities include lakh (one hundred thousand, 10^{5}) and crore (ten million, 10^{7}) – written as 1,00,000 and 1,00,00,000 respectively in some locales. For example: 150,000 rupees is "1.5 lakh rupees" which can be written as "1,50,000 rupees", and 30,000,000 (thirty million) rupees is referred to as "3 crore rupees" which can be written as "3,00,00,000 rupees".

There are names for numbers larger than crore, but they are less commonly used. These include arab (100 crore, 10^{9}), kharab (100 arab, 10^{11}), nil or sometimes transliterated as neel (100 kharab, 10^{13}), padma (100 nil, 10^{15}), shankh (100 padma, 10^{17}), and mahashankh (100 shankh, 10^{19}). In common parlance (though inconsistent), the lakh and crore terminology repeats for larger numbers. Thus lakh crore is 10^{12}.

In the ancient Indian system, still in use in regional languages of India, there are single-word names for up to 10^{62} (see § Historic numbering systems). In the Indian system, now prevalent in the northern parts, the next powers of ten are one lakh, ten lakh, one crore, ten crore, one arab (or one hundred crore), and so on.

== Multiples ==
The Indian system is decimal (base-10), same as in the International System of Units, and the first five orders of magnitude are named in a similar way: one (10^{0}), ten (10^{1}), one hundred (10^{2}), one thousand (10^{3}), and ten thousand (10^{4}). For higher powers of ten, naming diverges. The Indian system uses names for every second power of ten: lakh (10^{5}), crore (10^{7}), arab (10^{9}), kharab (10^{11}), etc. In the long and short scales, there are names for every third power of ten. The short scale uses million (10^{6}), billion (10^{9}), trillion (10^{12}), etc.

== Decimal formatting ==
In the Indian system, digits of a large decimal are grouped differently than in the International System of Units. Both systems indicate the first three digits to the left of the decimal point as a group. Thereafter, the Indian system groups by two digits. This aligns with the naming of quantities at multiples of 100.

Indian	International
5,00,000	500,000
12,34,56,789	123,456,789
17,00,00,00,000	17,000,000,000
6,78,90,00,00,00,00,000	6,789,000,000,000,000

Like English and other locales, the Indian system uses a period as the decimal separator and the comma for grouping, while others use a comma for decimal separator and a thin space or point to group digits.

== Pronunciation in English ==
When speakers of indigenous languages are speaking English, the pronunciations may be closer to their mother tongue, for example:

- lakh /lɑːkʰ/
- crore /kə.ɾoːɽ/ (or /kɹoʊɹ/ in American English)
- arab /ə.ɾəb/
- kharab /kʰə.ɾəb/

== Names of numbers ==
The table below includes the spelling and pronunciation of numbers in various Indian languages along with corresponding short scale names.

Value	Numerals	Short scale	Indian English	Hindustani Hindi / Urdu	Marathi	Bengali		Nepali	Tamil	Telugu
1	1	one	one	एक / ایک (ēk)	एक (ēk)	এক (êk)		एक (ēk)	ஒன்று (oṉṟu)	ఒకటి (okaṭi)
10	10	ten	ten	दस / دس (das)	दहा (dahā)	দশ (dôś)		दश (daś)	பத்து (pattu)	పది (padi)
10^{2}	100	hundred	hundred	सौ / سو (sau)	शंभर (śambhar)	শত (śato)		सय (saya)	நூறு (nūṟu)	వంద/నూరు (vanda/nūru)
10^{3}	1,000	thousand	thousand	हज़ार / ہزار (hazār)	एक हजार (ēk hajār)	হাজার (hāzār)		एक हजार (ēk hajār)	ஆயிரம் (āyiram)	వెయ్యి (veyyi)
10^{4}	10,000	ten thousand	ten thousand	दस हज़ार / دس ہزار (das hazār)	दहा हजार (dahā hajār)	অযুত (ōjut)	দশ হাজার (dôś hāzār)	दश हजार (daś hajār)	பத்தாயிரம் (pattāyiram) ஆயுதம் (āyutam)	పది వేలు (padi vēlu)
10^{5}	1,00,000	hundred thousand	lakh	लाख / لاکھ (lākh)	एक लाख (ēk lākh)	লক্ষ (lôkkhō)	লাখ (lākh)	एक लाख (ēk lākh)	இலட்சம் (ilaṭcam) நியுதம் (niyutam)	లక్ష (lakṣa)
10^{6}	10,00,000	million	ten lakh	दस लाख / دس لاکھ (das lākh)	दहा लाख (dahā lākh)	নিযুত (nijut)	দশ লাখ (dôś lākh)	दश लाख (daś lākh)	பத்து இலட்சம் (pattu ilaṭcam)	పది లక్షలు (padi lakṣalu)
10^{7}	1,00,00,000	ten million	crore	करोड़ / کروڑ (karōṛ)	एक कोटी (ēk kōṭī)	কোটি (kōṭi)		एक करोड (ēk karoḍ)	கோடி (kōṭi)	కోటి (kōṭi)
10^{8}	10,00,00,000	hundred million	ten crore	दस करोड़ / دس کروڑ (das karōṛ)	दहा कोटी (dahā kōṭī)	অর্বুদ (ōrbud)	দশ কোটি (dôś kōṭi)	दश करोड (daś karoḍ)	அற்புதம் (aṟputam)	పది కోట్లు (padi kōṭlu)
10^{9}	1,00,00,00,000	billion	arab / hundred crore	अरब / ارب (arab) सौ करोड़ / سو کروڑ (sau karōṛ)	एक अब्ज (ēk abja)	মহার্বুদ (môhārbud)	একশ কোটি (êkśō kōṭi)	एक अर्ब (ēk arba)	நிகற்புதம் (nikaṟputam)	వంద కోట్లు (vanda kōṭlu)
10^{10}	10,00,00,00,000	ten billion	ten arab / thousand crore	दस अरब / دس ارب (das arab) एक हज़ार करोड़ / ایک ہزار کروڑ (ēk hazār karōṛ)	एक खर्व (ek kharva)	খর্ব (khôrbō)	হাজার কোটি (hāzār kōṭi)	दश अर्ब (daś arba)	கும்பம் (kumpam)	వెయ్యి కోట్లు (veyyi kōṭlu)
10^{11}	1,00,00,00,00,000	hundred billion	kharab / hundred arab / ten thousand crore	खरब / کھرب (kharab)	एक निखर्व (ek nikharva)	মহাখর্ব (môhākhôrbō)	দশ হাজার কোটি (dôś hājār kōṭi)	एक खर्ब (ēk kharba)	கணம் (kaṇam)	పది వేల కోట్లు (padi vēla kōṭlu)
10^{12}	10,00,00,00,00,000	trillion	ten kharab / one thousand arab / one lakh crore	दस खरब / دس کھرب (das kharab) एक लाख करोड़ / ایک لاکھ کروڑ (ēk lākh karōṛ)	एक पद्म (ēk padma)	শঙ্খ (śôṅkhō)	লাখ কোটি (lākh kōṭi)	दश खर्ब (daś kharba)	கற்பம் (kaṟpam)	లక్ష కోట్లు (lakṣa kōṭlu)
10^{13}	1,00,00,00,00,00,000	ten trillion	nil / hundred kharab / ten thousand arab / ten lakh crore	नील / نیل (nīl)	एक महापद्म (ek mahāpadma)	মহাশঙ্খ (môhāśôṅkhō)	দশ লাখ কোটি (dôś lākh kōṭi)	नील (nīl)	நிகற்பம் (nikaṟpam)	పది లక్షల కోట్లు (padi lakṣala kōṭlu)
10^{14}	10,00,00,00,00,00,000	hundred trillion	ten nil / crore crore	दस नील / دس نیل (das nīl) एक करोड़ करोड़ / ایک کروڑ کروڑ (ēk karōṛ karōṛ)	एक शंखू (ēk śaṅkhū)	পদ্ম (pôddō)	একশ লাখ কোটি (êkśō lākh kōṭi) শতলক্ষ কোটি (śôtôkōṭi lôkkō)	दश नील (daś nīl)	பதுமம் (patumam)	కోటి కోట్లు (kōṭi kōṭlu)
10^{15}	1,00,00,00,00,00,00,000	quadrillion	padma / hundred nil / ten crore crore	पद्म / پدم (padma)	एक जलधि शंखू (eka jaladhi śaṅkhū)	মহাপদ্ম (môhāpôddō)	হাজার লাখ কোটি (hāzār lākh kōṭi)	पद्म (padma)	சங்கம் (caṅkam)	పది కోట్ల కోట్లు (padi kōṭla kōṭlu)

== Historic numbering systems ==
=== Numbering systems in Hindu epics ===
There are various systems of numeration found in various ancient epic literature of India (itihasas). The following table gives one such system used in the Valmiki Ramayana.

Name	Indian decimal	Value	Short scale
एक (ēka)	1	1	one
दश (daśa)	10	10	ten
शत (śata)	100	10^{2}	hundred
सहस्र (sahasra)	1,000	10^{3}	thousand
अयुत (ayuta)	10,000	10^{4}	ten thousand
लक्ष (lakṣa)	1,00,000	10^{5}	hundred thousand
कोटि (kōṭi)	1,00,00,000	10^{7}	ten million
शङ्कु (śaṅku)	1,00,000 koṭi	10^{12}	trillion
महाशङ्कु (mahāśaṅku)	1,00,000 śaṅku	10^{17}	hundred quadrillion
वृन्द (vr̥nda)	1,00,000 mahāśaṅku	10^{22}	ten sextillion
महावृन्द (mahāvr̥nda)	1,00,000 vr̥nda	10^{27}	octillion
पद्म (padma)	1,00,000 mahāvr̥nda	10^{32}	hundred nonillion
महापद्म (mahāpadma)	1,00,000 padma	10^{37}	ten undecillion
खर्व (kharva)	1,00,000 mahāpadma	10^{42}	tredecillion
महाखर्व (mahākharva)	1,00,000 kharva	10^{47}	hundred quattuordecillion
समुद्र (samudra)	1,00,000 mahākharva	10^{52}	ten sexdecillion
ओघ (ogha)	1,00,000 samudra	10^{57}	octodecillion
महौघ (mahaugha)	1,00,000 ogha	10^{62}	hundred novemdecillion

=== Other numbering systems ===
The denominations by which land was measured in the Kumaon Kingdom were based on arable lands and thus followed an approximate system with local variations. The most common of these was a vigesimal (base-20) numbering system with the main denomination called a bisi (see Hindustani number bīs), which corresponded to the land required to sow 20 nalis of seed. Consequently, its actual land measure varied based on the quality of the soil. This system became the established norm in Kumaon by 1891.

== Usage in different languages ==
Below is a list of translations for the words lakh and crore in other languages spoken in the Indian subcontinent:

Usage of lakh and crore in other Indic languages
Language	Lakh	Crore	100 crores (one billion)	1000 crores (10 billion)	10,000 crores (100 billion)
Assamese	লক্ষ lokhyo, or লাখ lakh	কৌটি kouti, or কোটি koti	—N/a		
Bengali	লাখ lākh (Note: Tadbhava), or লক্ষ lokkho (Note: Ardha-tatsama)	কোটি kōṭi	—N/a		
Burmese	lakh (Note: in Burmese English)	ကုဋေ [ɡədè]	—N/a		
Dhivehi	ލައްކަ la'kha	ކްރޯރް kroaru	—N/a		
Gujarati	લાખ lākh	કરોડ karoḍ	અબજ abaj	—N/a	
Hindi	लाख lākh	करोड़ karoṛ	अरब arab	—N/a	खरब kharab
Kannada	ಲಕ್ಷ lakṣha	ಕೋಟಿ kōṭi	—N/a		
Khasi	lak	klur or krur	arab	—N/a	kharab
Malayalam	ലക്ഷം laksham	കോടി kodi	—N/a		
Marathi	लाख/लक्ष lākh	कोटी koṭi, or करोड karoḍ	अब्ज abja	—N/a	
Nepali	लाख lākh	करोड karoḍ	—N/a		
Odia	ଲକ୍ଷ lôkhyô	କୋଟି koṭi	—N/a		
Punjabi	lakkh (Gurmukhi: ਲੱਖ, Shahmukhi: لکھ)	karoṛ (Gurmukhi: ਕਰੋੜ, Shahmukhi: کروڑ)	—N/a		
Rohingya	lák	kurul	—N/a	kuthí	—N/a
Sanskrit	लक्ष lakṣa	कोटि koṭi	अब्ज abja (Note: The names of the powers of ten above koṭi vary between Sanskrit mathematical texts. The names given here are those listed by Śrīdhara (c. 750) and Bhāskara II: koṭi (10^{7}), arbuda (10^{8}), abja (10^{9}), kharva (10^{10}), nikharva (10^{11}).)	खर्व kharva	निखर्व nikharva
Sinhala	ලක්ෂ lakṣa	කෝටි kōṭi	—N/a		
Tamil	இலட்சம் ilaṭcam	கோடி kōṭi	—N/a		
Telugu	లక్ష lakṣha	కోటి kōṭi	—N/a		
Urdu	لاکھ lākh	کروڑ karoṛ	ارب arab	—N/a	کھرب kharab

Formal written publications in English in India tend to use lakh/crore for Indian currency and International numbering for foreign currencies.

== Current usage ==
The official usage of this system is limited to the nations of India and Bangladesh. It is universally employed within these countries, and is preferred to the International numbering system. Pakistan, Sri Lanka and Nepal used this system in the past but have switched to the International numbering system in recent years. In the Maldives, the term lakh is widely used in official documents and local speech. However, the International System of Units is preferred for higher denominations (such as millions).

Most institutions and citizens in India use the Indian number system. The Reserve Bank of India was noted as a rare exception in 2015, whereas by 2024 the Indian system was used for amounts in rupees and the International system for foreign currencies throughout the Reserve Bank's website.

== See also ==
- Scientific notation
- Japanese notation
