= Myanmar English =

English register used in Myanmar

Burmese English
- Myanmar English
- အင်္ဂလိပ်
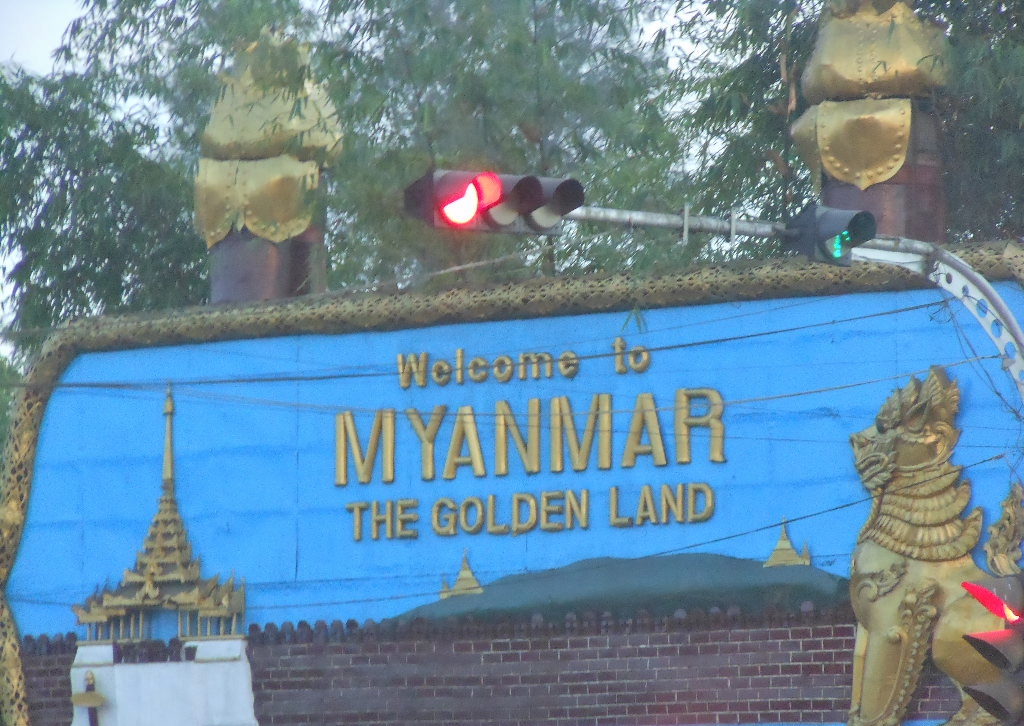
- A welcome sign in English in Myanmar.
- Pronunciation: [bámís ɪ́ɰ̃gəlɪ̀ʔ]
- Native to: Myanmar
- Language family: Indo-European: Germanic; West Germanic; Ingvaeonic; Anglo-Frisian; Anglic; English; Asian English; Southeast Asian English; Burmese English
- Early forms: Proto-Indo-European: Proto-Germanic; Proto-English; Old English; Middle English; Early Modern English; Modern English
- Writing system: Latin (English alphabet)

Language codes
- ISO 639-3: –
- IETF: en-MM

Burmese English or Myanmar English, colloquially Burglish or Myanglish, is the register of the English language used in Myanmar, spoken as a second language by an estimated 2.4 million people – about 5% of the population in 1997. English was introduced to Myanmar during initial British contact in the 17th century, but it became more prominent after British colonization began in 1826. English language teaching (ELT) in Myanmar has been shaped by practical needs, public attitudes, government policies, and learning opportunities. British English, particularly Received Pronunciation, was the main model, though American English also influenced learners through American-educated teachers and media. The role and status of English in Myanmar evolved across four key periods: the colonial era, the independence era, the socialist era, and the military rule. Currently, English is taught from Standard 0 (kindergarten), as a second language in Myanmar.

== History ==
Prior to colonization, Buddhist monasteries led education in local languages like Mon, Burmese, and Shan.

=== Colonial era (1826–1947) ===
The British Empire annexed modern-day Myanmar in three stages over a six-decade span (1824–1885), starting with the British annexation of Lower Burma in 1826, after which English was established as the official language of British Burma. It was integrated into the education system primarily to train local citizens for lower- and middle-ranking civil service positions. The first English-language missionary schools appeared around 1830, with the first government school established in Moulmein (now Mawlamyine) in 1834.

By 1900, three types of schools existed: English-only schools, Anglo-vernacular schools, and vernacular schools. English was taught from kindergarten in the first two, though access was limited to less than 5% of children. In 1876, a national Department of Education was formed, and in 1874, the first British high school in Rangoon (Yangon) was upgraded to a university college, later becoming part of Rangoon University in 1920. English was the medium of instruction in higher education, although it did not replace Burmese as the vernacular.

Teaching methodologies emphasized immersion, memorization, and recitation. Some early teachers were American or Indian, particularly in Lower Burma. However, growing nationalist sentiment from 1916 onwards sparked resistance to the dominance of the English language. Student protests and the establishment of national schools emphasized Burmese as a symbol of national identity. Burma was administered as a province of British India until 1937. Despite nationalist sentiment, English remained the official working language of government until the end of British rule in 1947.

=== Parliamentary era (1948–1962) ===
After gaining independence in 1948, Myanmar’s new government initiated the “Burmanization” policy, replacing English with Burmese as the official language. Nevertheless, English maintained its administrative importance due to existing English-language documents and officials' proficiency in English.

On 1 June 1950, a new education policy was implemented to replace English as the medium of instruction in all state schools, although universities, which continued to use English as the medium of instruction, were unaffected. Henceforth, English was taught as a second language only from the Fifth Standard. English remained the language of instruction at Burmese universities until 1965, especially in fields like medicine, science, and technology, due to a lack of Burmese-language resources.

=== Socialist era (1962–1988) ===
Under the Union Revolutionary Council (1962–1974) and Socialist government (1974–1988), Myanmar became largely isolated. Burmese was reaffirmed as the sole official and instructional language by the 1974 Constitution. English was reduced to a subject taught at schools and universities.

In 1964 and 1965, the University Act and educational reforms enforced the uniform use of Burmese in all institutions, replacing English as the medium of instruction at the university level, with the passing of the New University Education Law the previous year. English instruction began in Standard Five and focused primarily on reading and writing. After 1974, the government produced local English textbooks for basic and tertiary education.

By the 1980s, concerns about declining English proficiency in the country prompted a “New Education Program” (NEP). English language education was reintroduced in 1982. Key initiatives included:

- Introducing English as a compulsory subject from kindergarten (1981),
- Using English to teach science and economics at upper secondary and university levels (1986),
- Implementing teacher training programs.

However, these reforms were frequently disrupted by political unrest and closures of educational institutions.

=== Military occupation (1988–2007) ===
In 1988, after the military takeover following the 8888 Uprising, the country was renamed the Republic of the Union of Myanmar. A shift toward a market economy, increased foreign trade, tourism, and digital communication reignited interest in English.

Since 1991, English and Burmese have both been used as the medium of instruction in the 9th and 10th Standards, particularly in science and math subjects, which use English-language textbooks. Because of this, many Burmese are better able to communicate in written English than in spoken English, due to the emphasis placed on writing and reading.

Small private language schools emerged in urban centers, and the Institute of Foreign Languages was upgraded to the University of Foreign Languages (UFL), offering English and other language degrees. Due to widespread university closures (1988–2000), many students turned to distance education or private institutions, and some studied abroad.

Efforts to improve English instruction included intra-department teacher training, one-year postgraduate diplomas in ELT, and the introduction of PhD programs in English at Yangon and Mandalay Universities from 2002. Despite these efforts, English instruction in Myanmar remained teacher-centered, with an emphasis on grammatical accuracy over communicative fluency. Listening and speaking skills were often neglected in classrooms.

== Characteristics ==
=== Orthography ===
The preferred system of spelling is based on that of the British, although American English spellings have become increasingly popular. Because Adoniram Judson, an American, created the first Burmese-English dictionary, many American English spellings are common (e.g. color, check, encyclopedia). The ⟨-ize⟩ spelling is more commonly used than the ⟨-ise⟩ spelling.

=== Vocabulary ===
Burmese English reflects a mix of influences and localized usage. Some words come from Indian English, like dacoit (armed robber) and pandal (makeshift structure), while others are borrowed from Burmese to describe culturally specific items, such as oozie (elephant driver) and pwe (public performance). The Oxford English Dictionary lists more than 40 words of Burmese origin in English. Unique Burmese English coined terms include platform (meaning 'pavement' or 'sidewalk') and stage show (meaning 'concert'). Some English words are used with different meanings, such as sidecar for 'trishaw' and linecar for 'public bus.' Due to limited vocabulary, Myanmar speakers may use simpler or redundant expressions, like eat for have/drink and phrases like fluency skills instead of just fluency.

For units of measurement Burmese English uses both those of the Imperial System and those of the International System of Units interchangeably, but the values correspond to the SI system. Burmese English continues to use Indian numerical units such as lakh and crore.

The Burmese language, especially the colloquial form, has borrowed daily vocabulary from English, especially as portmanteaus with native Burmese vocabulary. For instance, the Burmese word for 'ball' is bawlon (ဘောလုံး, lit. 'round ball'), while the Burmese word for bus is bat-sa-ka (ဘတ်စကား, lit. 'bus car').

==== Honorifics ====
Burmese names represented in English often include various honorifics, most commonly "U", "Daw", and "Sayadaw". For older Burmese who only have one or two syllables in their names these honorifics may be an integral part of the name.

=== Pronunciation ===
Burmese English is often characterised by its unaspirated consonants, similar to Indian English. In Burmese English, the k, p, and t consonants are unaspirated (pronounced /k/, /p/, /t/), as a general rule, as in Indian English. The following are commonly seen pronunciation differences between Standard English and Burmese English:

Standard English	Burmese English	Remarks
/ɜːr/ (e.g. further, Burma)	/á/	Pronounced with a high tone (drawn-out vowel), as in Burmese
Word-final /aʊ/ (e.g. now, brow)	/áuɴ/	Pronounced with a nasal final instead of an open vowel
Word-final /aɪ/ (e.g. pie, lie)	/aiɴ/	Pronounced with a nasal final instead of an open vowel
/tjuː/ (e.g. tuba)	/tɕu/	e.g. "tuition," commonly pronounced [tɕùʃìɴ]
/sk/ (e.g. ski)	/sək-/	Pronounced as 2 syllables
/st/ (e.g. star)	/sət-/	Pronounced as 2 syllables
/pl/ (e.g. plug)	/pəl/	Pronounced as 2 syllables
/sp/ (e.g. spoon)	/səp/	Pronounced as 2 syllables
/v/ (e.g. vine)	/b/	
/ŋk/ (e.g. think)	/ḭɴ/	Pronounced with a short, creaky tone (short vowel)
/ŋ/ (e.g. thing)	/iɴ/	Pronounced as a nasal final
consonantal finals (.e.g. stop)	/-ʔ/	Pronounced as a glottal stop (as in written Burmese, where consonantal finals are pronounced as a stop)

In addition, many words retain British pronunciation, such as pronouncing vitamin /ˈvɪtəmɪn/ as /vi.ta.mɪɴ/. Burmese English is non-rhotic.

== See also ==
- Commonwealth English
