= South Asian English =

Regional variation of British English spoken in South Asia

South Asian English, informally Desi English, refers to English dialects spoken in most modern-day South Asian countries, inherited from British English dialect. Also known as Anglo-Indian English during the British Raj, the English language was introduced to the Indian subcontinent in the early 17th century. Today it is spoken as a second language by about 350 million people, 20% of the total population.

Although it is fairly homogeneous across the subcontinent, sharing "linguistic features and tendencies at virtually all linguistic levels", there are some differences based on various regional factors.

South Asian English is sometimes just called "Indian English", as British India included most of modern-day South Asia (except Afghanistan); but today, the varieties of English are officially divided according to the modern states:

- Bangladeshi English
- Indian English
- Maldivian English
- Nepalese English
- Pakistani English
- Sri Lankan English

== History ==
=== British India ===
English-language public instruction began in the subcontinent in the 1830s during the rule of the British East India Company. In 1835, English replaced Persian as the official language of the East India Company. Lord Macaulay played a major role in introducing English and Western concepts into educational institutions in British-India. He supported the replacement of Persian by English as the official language, the use of English as the medium of instruction in all schools, and the training of English-speaking Indians as teachers. Throughout the 1840s and 1850s, primary, middle, and high schools were opened in many districts of British India, with most high schools offering English language instruction in some subjects. In 1857, just before the end of East India Company rule, universities that were modeled on the University of London and used English as the medium of instruction were established in Bombay, Calcutta and Madras. During the British Raj (1858 to 1947), English-language penetration increased throughout the subcontinent. This was driven in part by the gradually increasing hiring of Indians in the civil services. At the time of Indian independence in 1947, English was the only functional lingua franca in the region.

== See also ==
- Englishisation in South Asia
- Commonwealth English
