= Pakistani English =

Varieties of the English language used in Pakistan

- Native to: Pakistan
- Region: South Asia
- Native speakers: 156 million (2026)
- Language family: Indo-European: Germanic; West Germanic; Ingvaeonic; Anglo-Frisian; English; British English; South Asian English; Pakistani English
- Early forms: Old English: Middle English; Early Modern English; Modern English
- Writing system: Latin (English alphabet); Unified English Braille

Official status
- Official language in: Pakistan

Language codes
- ISO 639-1: en
- ISO 639-2: eng
- ISO 639-3: eng
- Glottolog: paki1244
- IETF: en-PK

Pakistani English (also known as Paklish or Pinglish) is the variant of the English language spoken and written in Pakistan and among the Pakistani diaspora. English is the primary language used by the government of Pakistan, alongside Urdu, on the national level. While being spoken natively by only a small percentage of the population, it is the primary language used in education, commerce, administration, and the legal and judicial systems. When combining L1, L2, and L3 speakers, English is the most spoken language in Pakistan with 156M speakers.

It was first recognised as a distinct variety of South Asian English and designated in the 1970s and 1980s. Pakistani English is slightly different from British English, from which it is derived, in respect to vocabulary, accent, and other features.

== Historical development ==
Although British rule in the Indian subcontinent lasted for almost two hundred years, the areas which lie in what is now Pakistan were amongst the last to be annexed: Sindh in 1842, Punjab (which initially included the North-West Frontier Province) in 1849, and parts of Baluchistan, including Quetta and the outer regions in 1879, while the rest of the Baluchistan region became a princely state within the British Empire. As a result, British English had less time to become part of local culture though it did become part of elite culture as it was used in elite schools and in higher education, as in the rest of British India. The colonial policies which made English a marker of elite status and the language of power—being used in such domains of power as the civil service, the officer corps of the armed forces, the higher judiciary, universities, prestigious newspapers, radio and entertainment—were due to British policies and the continuation of these policies by Pakistani governments.

In 1947 upon Pakistan's establishment, English became the de facto official language, a position which was formalised in the Constitution of Pakistan of 1973. Together with Urdu, the two languages are concurrently the official languages of the country. English language continues as the language of power and is also the language with the maximum cultural capital of any language used in Pakistan. It remains much in demand in higher education in Pakistan.

The term Pinglish was first recorded in 1999, being a blend of the words Pakistani and English, with the 'e' changed to 'i' to better represent pronunciation. Another colloquial portmanteau word is Paklish (recorded from 1997).

Rahman argues that PE is an interference variety of English created by the use of the features of Punjabi, Pashto, Saraiki, Sindhi and other languages spoken in Pakistan. He further divides PE into Anglicised English, which is very similar to the speech and writing of the speakers of British Standard English (BSE), acrolect PE, which is used by Pakistanis educated in English-medium schools, mesolectal PE, which is used by ordinary, Urdu-educated Pakistanis and basilect PE, which is used by people of little formal education, such as guides and waiters. Words and expressions of PE have been noted by a number of scholars, including unique idioms and colloquial expressions as well as accents. The area which is now Pakistan was home to the largest garrisons of the British Indian Army (such as Rawalpindi and Peshawar) and this, combined with the post-partition influence of the Pakistan Military, has ensured that many military terms have entered the local jargon. The type of English taught (and preferred) is British English. The heavy influence and penetration of American culture through television, films and other media has brought in great influences of American English.

== Use in Pakistan ==
Urdu and English are Pakistan's official languages. Many street signs, shop signs, business contracts and other activities use English. All documents used by government and court also include English, despite a 2015 order by Pakistan's Supreme Court to replace English at an official level with Urdu.

English is most taught to Pakistani students in private schools, and in many cases the medium of instruction is also in English. Although there are also many public schools that teach in the local languages and Urdu, there is a huge emphasis on English as a second language especially in standardised testing. At college and university level, all instructions are typically in English.

Pakistan boasts a large English language press and media. All of Pakistan's major dailies are published in or have an edition in English. State-run PTV World is a major English Language News Channel in the country, while previously Dawn News and Tribune 24/7 were other English language news channels with one later switching its language to Urdu and the other was shut down. Indus News is now another major English language news channel in Pakistan. Code-switching (the concurrent use of more than one language, or language variety, in conversation) is common in urban areas of Pakistan and almost all conversations in whatever language have a present English component. The language of pleading in all courts of Pakistan is also English.

== Grammar ==
The role of English within the complex multilingual society of Pakistan is far from straightforward: it is used across the country by speakers with various degrees of proficiency; the grammar and phraseology may mimic that of the speaker's first language. While Pakistani speakers of English use idioms peculiar to their homeland (often literal translations of words and phrases from their native languages), this is far less common in proficient speakers, and grammar tends to be quite close to that of Standard English but exhibiting some features of American English.

== Phonology ==
Not all Pakistanis have the same accent, as the level of cultivation (i.e. the closeness to Received Pronunciation) of every speaker's accent differs. Pakistani English phonology follows that of British English. It may be rhotic or non-rhotic. Rahman provides a broad introduction to the phonology of Pakistani English.

Some common features of PE are:

=== Consonants ===
- /t/ in almost all regions of Pakistan is realised as [ʈ] and /d/ is realised as [ɖ].
- Most PE speakers can not distinguish well between /v/ and /w/, pronouncing them both as [ʋ].
- The quality of /ɹ/ sound in PE is usually [ɾ].
- Most, if not all, PE speakers do not aspirate their voiceless plosives /p t k/.
- PE does not have [ɫ] (velarised L)
- PE speakers use [ŋɡ] before vowels in some words where standard Englishes (GenAmE and SSBE) would use [ŋ], for example, "singer" is pronounced [ˈsiŋɡər]
- PE speakers use [ŋ] after consonants in words where standard Englishes would use [ŋɡ], so "English" is pronounced [ˈiŋliʃ] rather than [ˈɪŋɡlɪʃ].
- The dental fricatives /θ/ and /ð/ are realised as dental stops i.e. [t̪ʰ] and [d̪] respectively.

=== Vowels and diphthongs ===
- The vowel quality of /iː/ is something closer to [i]
- /oʊ/ in PE is realised as [oː]
- The BATH vowel /ɑː/ is realised as or [ä̝]
- /uː/ is realised as [uː]
- The vowel in THOUGHT group (J. C. Wells Lexical sets) is realised by virtually all PE speakers as [ä̝]

== Vocabulary and colloquialisms ==
Pakistani English has a number of dialectal words and phrases.These are mostly informal terms that are more common in casual speech. For instance, "chips" is used for potato chips as well as for French fries (usage of these terms is common in the UK) and "lemon" is used for both lime and lemon.

- "Uncle / Aunty" – Respectful way of addressing anyone who is significantly older than oneself: "Uncle, please give way".
- Use of double and triple for numbers occurring twice or three times in succession (this is also in usage in the UK), especially for a phone number: for example, a phone number 2233344 would be pronounced as "double two, triple three, double four"; however the phone number 2222555 would be pronounced as "double two, double two, triple five".
- Shopper means a shopping bag, rather than a person who is shopping, the latter is referred to as a customer.
- Petrol pump — This term used to refer to a petrol station (gas station).
- Opening/closing an object refers to turning something on or off; this is due to the verbs for to open and to close being the same as the verbs for to turn on and to turn off in Pakistani languages.
- "Alphabet" - can be used to refer to a single letter and "alphabets" can refer to a group of two or more letters.
- The use of "much" to emphasise the extent/magnitude of something. e.g. very much true instead of that's very true and too much difficult instead of very difficult.
- Light – The term "light" has an additional meaning, referring to electricity. When the power goes out or comes back after an outage, one might say "Light has gone" or "Light's back."
- Numbers – Often used in place of "marks" in an exam.
- His/her meter has turned or -is high means that the person has lost his/her temper. Usually used for a sudden outburst, one which is construed as unreasonable.
- Got no lift – received no attention or assistance from someone.
- In-Charge – a casual as well as formal title given to unit, group or division heads.
- Same to same – an expression to indicate something is exactly the same as some other thing.
- On parade – being at work or at a set activity. Usually (though not always) in the context of starting something for the first time. For example, I have been hired by the company, on parade from next Monday.
- Become a direct Sergeant – be promoted out of turn/ given responsibility and authority very early. Often in the context that a person is out of his/her depth. For example, no wonder that team has failed so badly, leader was a direct Sergeant. Usually "Sergeant" is replaced by "Havildar" the equivalent rank in the Pakistan Army. Also used for upwardly mobile, ambitious or nouveau riche.
- Miss is used to address or refer to female teachers, whatever their marital status, e.g. Yes, I have done my homework, Miss. Less commonly used to refer to women colleagues or subordinates. (Usage is also common in the UK)
- Madam is used to address and refer to females in positions of authority, usually a superior, e.g. Madam has ordered me to get the figures for last year's sales. Can also be used as a noun, e.g. She is the madam of that department meaning she is the head of the department, without it being derogatory.
- Sir is used for a male superior, often combined with their name or used as a noun. E.g. Is Sir in? or Sir Raza wants to see you in his office as soon as possible.
- Well left – avoided artfully, often a tricky situation; from cricket, the term "well left" is applied when a batsman chose not to play a potentially dangerous delivery, e.g. I well left that offer, it could have caused many problems.
- Threw/Received a googly – an unexpected situation arose, a person was surprised, often unpleasantly, e.g. had just settled down and then got the googly about the transfer. From googly, a delivery in cricket.
- Yorker – a sudden, dangerous and potentially devastating situation; similar use to googly, but usually has a certain amount of danger attached to it. My mother's heart attack while we were hiking in the mountains hit like a yorker, we were far from any medical help. Also used in a similar manner; bouncer. All three terms are derived from actual cricket deliveries, cricket being a popular sport in the country.
- Hit middle stump – did an action in such a manner that there is little room for further action, or a decisive blow, e.g. Really hit middle stump last year on that contract. Also derived from cricket.
- Master Sahib, contracted to Ma'Sahib – used to refer to a master craftsman. The term is now used more frequently to refer to tailors and carpenters.
- Drinking a cigarette/cigar – smoking a cigarette. This is due to the verbs for smoking being the same as the verbs for drinking in Pakistani languages.
- Elder – used as a comparative adjective in the sense of older. For example, "I am elder to you", instead of "I am older than you."
- Even – as well/also/too: "Even I didn't know how to do it." This usage of even is borrowed from native grammatical structure.
- Graduation – completion of a bachelor's degree (as in the UK): "I did my graduation at Presidency College" ("I earned my bachelor's degree at Presidency College"), whereas in the United States it refers to completion of Highschool, Master's or PhD as well.
- Paining – hurting would be correct in Standard American and British: "My head is paining."
- Shirtings and suitings – the process of making such garments; a suffix in names of shops specialising in men's formal/business wear.
- Timings – hours of operation; scheduled time, such as office timings or train timings, as opposed to the standard usage such as "The timing of his ball delivery is very good."
- Gentry – generalised term for social class – not specifically 'high social class'. The use of 'good', 'bad', 'high' and 'low' prefixed to 'gentry' is common.
- goat meat instead of sheep meat.
- Washroom – public toilet, restroom, bathroom

Words unique to (i.e. not generally well known outside South Asia) and/or popular in Pakistan include those in the following by no means exhaustive list:

- straight fire to describe shooting a firearm aimed directly at someone as opposed to warning shots aimed away from the target.
- batchmate or batch-mate (not classmate, but a schoolmate of the same grade)
- compass box for a box holding mathematical instruments like compasses, divider, scale, protractor etc.; also widely referred to as a "geometry box"
- cousin-brother (male first cousin) and cousin-sister (female first cousin)
- overhead bridge (bridge meant for pedestrians)
- flyover (overpass or an over-bridge over a section of road or train tracks)
- godown (warehouse)
- godman somewhat pejorative word for a person who claims to be divine or who claims to have supernatural powers
- long-cut (the opposite of "short-cut", in other words, taking the longest route).
- mugging/cramming or mugging up (memorising, usually referring to learning "by rote", as used in British English and having nothing to do with street crime, that the expression might also mean in British/American English).
- nose-screw (woman's nose-ring)
- prepone (The "opposite" of postpone, that is to change a meeting to be earlier). Many dictionaries have added this word.
- BHK is real-estate terminology for "Bedroom, Hall and Kitchen", used almost exclusively in housing size categorisation. "Hall" refers to the living room, which is highlighted separately from other rooms. For instance, a 2BHK apartment has a total of three rooms – two bedrooms and a living room.
- co-brother indicates relationship between two men who are married to sisters, as in "He is my co-brother"
- co-inlaws indicates relationship between two sets of parents whose son and daughter are married, as in "Our co-inlaws live in Karachi."
- co-sister indicates relationship between two women who are married to brothers, as in "She is my co-sister"
- boss is a term used to refer to a male stranger such as shopkeeper: "Boss, what is the cost of that pen?"
- vote-bank is a term commonly used during the elections in Pakistan, implying a particular bloc or community of people inclined to cast their votes for a political party that promises to deliver policies favouring them.
- pant – Trousers
- Mess – A dining hall, especially used by students at a dormitory. "Mess" is also used in reference to eateries catering primarily to a working class population. Originated from the military term of similar meaning.
- Eve teasing – Verbal sexual harassment of women.
- "Where are you put up?" means 'Where are you currently staying?".
- "Out of station": "out of town". This phrase has its origins in the posting of army officers to particular "stations" during the days of the East India Company.
- "acting pricey": playing "hard to get", being snobbish.
- "pass out" is meant to graduate, as in "I passed out of the university in 1995". In American/British English, this usage is limited to graduating out of military academies.
- "tight slap" to mean "hard slap".
- Time-pass – Doing something for leisure but with no intention or target/satisfaction, procrastination, pastime.
- Time-waste – Something that is a waste of time; procrastination. Presumably not even useful for leisure.
- Pindrop silence – Extreme silence (quiet enough to hear a pin drop).
- chargesheet: n. formal charges filed in a court; v. to file charges against someone in court
- redressal: n. redress, remedy, reparation
- "Hill Station" – mountain resort.
- "stepney" refers to a spare tyre. The word is a genericised trademark originating from the Stepney Spare Motor Wheel, itself named after Stepney Street, in Llanelli, Wales.
- Cooling glasses – sunglasses
- "cent per cent", "cent percent" – "100 percent/100 per cent" as in "He got cent per cent in math/maths".
- "loose motion" – diarrhoea
- "papers" – Examination or tests in any educational institution.
- "expire" – To die, especially in reference to one's family member.
- "bunking" – To skip class without permission, compare UK bunking off
- "carrying" – to be pregnant, as in "She is carrying".
- "pressurise" – to put pressure on someone, to influence.
- "club" or "clubbing" – To merge or put two things together. "Just club it together."
- "cantonment" – permanent military installation.
- "taking an exam/test" as opposed to "taking/writing an exam", a phrase more commonly used in the US and Canada. ("giving a test" is used to refer to a person who is going to conduct the test)
- "register" as opposed to "notebook", a phrase more commonly used in the US.
- "copy" is used for notebook.
- "lady finger" is used for okra.

Words which are considered archaic in some varieties of English, but are still in use in Pakistani English:

- Curd – yogurt
- Dicky/Dickey/Digy – the trunk of a car (also obs "dicky seat" UK).
- In tension – being concerned or nervous. Phrased another way, "He is taking too much tension". Found in eighteenth-century British English.
- Into – multiplied by, as in 2 into 2 equals 4, rather than 2 times 2 is 4, which is more common in other varieties of English. The use of into dates back to the fifteenth century, when it had been common in British English.
- ragging – also used in public schools in the UK, hazing (US).
- Use of thrice, meaning "three times", is common in Pakistani English.
- Use of the phrases like nothing or like anything to express intensity. For example, "These people will cheat you like anything". Such usage was part of colloquial English language in seventeenth century Britain and America.
- Word pairs "up to" and "in spite" compounded to "upto" and "inspite" respectively.
- Over – to speak frankly. "Don't be too over with me."
- Weeping – crying.

=== Numbering system ===
The international grouping system is used in Pakistan. When written in words, or when spoken, numbers less than 100,000 are expressed just as they are in Standard English. Numbers including and beyond 100,000 are expressed in a subset of the Pakistani numbering system. Thus, the following scale is used:

In digits (Western system)	In words (Standard English)	In words (Pakistani English)
10	ten	
100	one hundred	
1,000	one thousand	
10,000	ten thousand	
100,000	one hundred thousand	one lac/lakh (from lākh لاکھ)
1,000,000	one million	ten lac/lakh (from lākh لاکھ)
10,000,000	ten million	one crore (from karoṛ کروڑ)
1,000,000,000	one billion	one arab (from arab ارب)
100,000,000,000	one hundred billion	one kharab (from kharab کھرب)

Larger numbers are generally expressed as multiples of the above.

=== Medical terms ===
Often the cause of undesirable confusion.

- Viral Fever: Influenza
- Flu: Common Cold
- Sugar: Diabetes
- Jaundice: Acute Hepatitis. While standard medical terminology uses jaundice for a symptom (yellow discolouration of skin), in Pakistan the term is used to refer to the illness in which this symptom is most common.
- Allopathy, used by homoeopaths to refer to conventional medicine.

=== Food ===
- Brinjal: aubergines / eggplant
- Capsicum: called chili pepper, red or green pepper, or sweet pepper in the UK and US; capsicum in Australia, New Zealand, Pakistan, Sri Lanka and India; bell pepper in the US, Canada, and the Bahamas; and paprika in the US and some other countries.
- Curds: Yogurt
- Sooji: Semolina
- Pulses, dal: pulses, e.g. lentils
- Karahi, kadai: wok
- Sago: tapioca, Yuca in US
- Ladyfinger, bhindi: okra
- Sabzi: greens, green vegetables

== See also ==
- Urdish
- English in the Commonwealth of Nations
