= Nepalese English =

West Germanic language of Nepali dialect spoken by Nepali people

- Nepali English
- Native to: Nepal
- Region: South Asia
- Language family: Indo-European: Germanic; West Germanic; Ingvaeonic; Anglo-Frisian; Anglic; English; British English; South Asian English; Nepalese English
- Early forms: Proto-Indo-European: Proto-Germanic; Proto-English; Old English; Middle English; Early Modern English; Modern English
- Writing system: Latin

Language codes
- ISO 639-3: –
- IETF: en-NP

Nepalese English refers to a variety of the English language principally used in Nepal as well as neighboring Sikkim and Gorkhaland regions of India. It is heavily influenced by the Indo-Aryan languages of Nepal.

Many Nepalese speak English as a second or foreign language, with English use being most prevalent among city dwellers residing in Kathmandu (the capital of Nepal). Although Nepali is the native language, English is the primary language used for business in Nepal. In Nepal, where modern English education began in the 1850s, there is little or no consensus among teachers and practitioners on whether to follow British, American or Indian variants of English, or allow the development of a Nepal-specific variety of English.

Colloquially, code-mixed Nepali and English is known as Nenglish (a term first recorded in 1999), or, less commonly, as Nepanglish (2000) or Neplish (2002).

== See also ==
- Languages of Nepal
- Nepal
- Nepali language
- Gurung language
- Magar language
- Tamang language
- Limbu language
- Newar language
