= Sri Lankan English =

Dialect of English

- Native to: Sri Lanka
- Region: South Asia
- Language family: Indo-European: Germanic; West Germanic; Ingvaeonic; Anglo-Frisian; Anglic; English; British English; South Asian English; Sri Lankan English
- Early forms: Proto-Indo-European: Proto-Germanic; Proto-English; Old English; Middle English; Early Modern English; Modern English
- Writing system: Latin

Official status
- Recognised minority language in: Sri Lanka

Language codes
- ISO 639-3: –
- IETF: en-LK

Sri Lankan English (SLE) is the English language as it is used in Sri Lanka, a term dating from 1972, before which it was known as Ceylonese English in Ceylon. Sri Lankan English is principally categorised as the Standard Variety and the Nonstandard Variety, which is called as "Not Pot English". The classification of SLE as a separate dialect of English is controversial. English in Sri Lanka is spoken by approximately 23.8% of the population (2012 est.), and widely used for official and commercial purposes.

The British colonial presence in South Asia led to the introduction of English to Sri Lanka. Since 1681, some words have been borrowed from Sinhala and Tamil by English. In 1948, Ceylon gained independence from the United Kingdom, and English was no longer the only official language. In subsequent years, inequality in access to education and national conflict have confounded the development and the use of SLE, particularly in Sri Lankan literature. SLE varies from British or American English in elements such as colloquialisms, vocabulary, syntax, pronunciation, and emphasis of syllables. SLE generally favours British spellings ("colour", "programme", "analyse," and "centre") over American spellings ("color", "program", "analyze," and "center"). SLE also favours the British "Q Before P" rule (i.e., ".) over the reverse (i.e., .").

== Sri Lankan words in English ==
Sri Lankan words that were borrowed by the English and are used in the language are recorded in A Historical Relation of the Island Ceylon in the East Indies. Such words often relate to flora and fauna:

- anaconda
- betel
- rattan
- wanderoo
- Beriberi

== Attitudes ==
Having taken root in Sri Lanka (then Ceylon) in 1796, Sri Lankan English has gone through over two centuries of development. In terms of its socio-cultural setting, Sri Lankan English can be explored largely in terms of different stages of the country's class and racial tension, economy, social disparity, and postwar rehabilitation and reconciliation. For instance, the country witnessed a general lowering in the standard of English following the Sinhala Only Act that was introduced in 1956. English as a medium of education in schools were dropped, and the act also prompted the emigration of the predominantly English-speaking Burgher community of Sri Lanka. That resulted in the Sinhala language gaining more prominence in all domains of Sri Lanka, but its influence on Sri Lankan English also increased. In fact, the merging of the two languages resulted in a so-called "Singlish", which remains a significant feature of Sri Lankan English.

That period was followed by the 1970s revival of an open-market economy, the increased exposure to foreign media and the internet, a rising expatriate community and the growth of English-medium "international schools" The Sri Lankan government also recognised the importance of English not only as a life skill needed to maintain contact with the outside world but also as a necessary link language in a country that is home to several cultures and ethnicities.

Just like the other languages spoken in Sri Lanka, Sri Lankan English has also come to have its own classifications of both regional and class dialects. According to one study, it was found that colloquial features and pronunciations that distinguish Sri Lankan English from the standard form is highly influenced by the country's mother tongue. One such example is its notably-large number of Sinhalese loanwords used. There are also many loanwords borrowed from Tamil, Malay, Arabic, Dutch, and Portuguese languages.

Moreover, it is hard to point out an exact number of Sri Lankan English speakers. A relatively-small portion of Sri Lankans, namely the Colombo elite, considers English its first language. That community arguably makes up a prominent part of Sri Lanka's social, cultural, political, and commercial circles.

Additionally, just like any other language, SLE is constantly evolving with the new generation. That is particularly noticeable when one compares the English used by older generations who spoke a more "colonial" English that was highly influenced by the British during and after independence. Despite such changes, the question of what constitutes a standard form of Sri Lankan English remains unanswered. Within certain social circles, the term "Sri Lankan English" is closely referred to a form of "broken" English, which is not spoken fluently. However, others disagree with that notion and acknowledges that SLE is a valid form.

In spite of its wide usage, many English-speakers do not acknowledge the existence of the Sri Lankan variety of English. In terms of class distinctions, the so-called Colombo elite of the "Colombo 07" families of Sri Lanka consider English to be their first language, and the variety of English spoken by them is considered to be closer to the international standard of English. However, the further one goes from the main areas of Colombo, the greater is the influence of Sinhalese and Tamil on the English that is spoken there, with varying degrees of bilingualism.

== Colloquialisms ==
Colloquialisms have emerged in SLE. Some involve vocabulary. Others involve grammar (such as tense and plurals), syntax, and intonation.

== Vocabulary ==
SLE word or phrase	English equivalent	Notes
bugger	person	Used in informal speech, but not always in the usual pejorative sense of the word: sometimes similar to "guy" in American English.
parallelly	in parallel	
Shape!	It's alright!	Used to say someone is okay with something, mainly around urban areas.
pass out	graduate	
confinement	pregnancy	Not just the last trimester.
lady's fingers	okra	Not Lady finger bananas.
shorteats	snacks	Sometimes shortened to sorties. This is usually due to mispronunciation.
hotel	restaurant	This is mostly due to marketing.
cover	wrapper	Something that envelops something like a bag.
pattice or pattis	a vegetable patty cake	
stay	reside	Not "Where are you lodging for the time being?". This usage also occurs in Scotland and in the United States.
batchmate	classmate	Meaning a student contemporary.
cousin-brother	a first male cousin	
cousin-sister	a first female cousin	
petrol shed	gas station (US) filling station (UK) service station (Aus)	
ragging	hazing (US) fagging (UK)	
in vain	unnecessarily	or "a shame"
keep	put place	"Keep it on the table" means "put it on the table".
too much	naughty, pushy, forward, etc.	Expressing excess.
fully worth	good value	
get down from the [bus]	alight	
get [them] down	invite [them] over	
played [me] out	deceived [me]	
ask from	ask	Meaning "ask something of someone".
put	make	For example, "put a complaint" means "make a complaint".
current	electricity power	
today morning	this morning	
yesterday night	last night	
teledrama	TV series	
sin	expression of sorrow or remorse, usually in reference to someone or something	For example, "what a sin!"
outstation	anywhere outside of Colombo	"I can't be there, I'll be outstation."
raise the devil	to make someone angry	For example, "Don't raise the devil in me!"

== Grammar ==
Words and tags may be added, subtracted, overused, or changed in order and tense in SLE.

SLE phrase	Mechanism	Notes and examples
"Don't worry about small small things."	Doubling adjectives for emphasis	Meaning "Don't worry about very unimportant things".
"Different different worries."	Doubling adjectives to imply number/ duplication	"Many different worries".
"He went to different different places"	Doubling adjectives for emphasis	Meaning "He went to many different places".
"Let's go to city" and "Let's go to town".	Omission of definite article	Meaning "Let's go to the city".
"You can serve".	Omission of reflexive pronoun	Meaning "You can serve yourself".
"Pick me" or "drop me".	Omission of adverb	Meaning "Pick me up" or "drop me off".
"Go to home"	Addition of directional preposition	Meaning "Go home".
"The driver is new. He is driving fast also".	Use of "also" instead of "and" or "both"	Meaning, "The driver is new, and he drives fast".
"Why they are here?"	Changed word order in questions	Meaning "Why are they here?".
"If you came here yesterday, you could meet her".	Changed use of tense	For example, "If you had come here yesterday, you could have met her".
"only"	Changed word order	"Yesterday only they came" meaning "It was only yesterday that they came".
"isn't it?" and "no?"	Tag added to a question	For example "He's here, no?".
"uncle", "aunty"	Added suffix	A form of address to show respect to an older person.
"even"	Added at end of sentence	For example "He didn't call even" meaning "He didn't even call" and not "He even didn't call" or "Even he didn't call".

== Pronunciation ==
Speakers of Sri Lankan English have varying ability to produce certain sounds. Again, the sound of /ɑː/ in "father" and /ʌ/ in "luck" are absent in Sinhala; so, Sri Lankans may have difficulty pronouncing them in SLE. However, these sounds were adapted to Sinhalese alphabet, (e.g., ෆ, and fa), thus many Sri Lankans experience no trouble in proper pronunciation of these sounds.

Syncope occurs, as it does in many other languages. For example, "exercise" and "conversation" may be pronounced "excise" and "conversion".

Additionally, some differences in pronunciation may relate to socioeconomic background and level of education. For example, a word like "note" is pronounced with a diphthong, /noʊt/, in standard English. In SLE, it is pronounced /noːt/ with the monophthong; /oː/ and is accepted as normal in Sri Lanka. However, pronouncing a word like "hall" (/hɔːl/) as */‍hoːl/ is not accepted. The non-standard variety "Not Pot English" is formed based on the variant pronunciations of /o/ and /ɔ/ sounds by the Sri Lankan speakers. The confusion between full and half /o/ sounds is noted as a class marker; the label "Not Pot" itself reflects this mispronunciation. Confused words for Sri Lankan speakers include hall and hole, ball and bowl, and phone and call. Examples of some other words pronounced with a monophthong include "take" and "made", "cake" and "rake", and "go" and "no".

Those unfamiliar with English may add an involuntary /i-/ prior to words like "skill" and "smell". However, this is not standard in SLE.

Examples of altered vowel sounds in Sri Lankan English
Example	RP	GA	Sri Lankan English
"e" in "net"	[e ~ ɛ]	[ɛ]	[e]
"i" in "lid"	[ɪ]	[ɪ]	[i]
"oo" in "book"	[ʊ]	[ʊ]	[u]
"oo" in "boot"	[uː ~ ʉː]	[uː]	[u]
"o" in "ok"	[əʊ ~ əʉ]	[oʊ]	[oː]

Examples of altered consonants in Sri Lankan English
Example	English	American	Sri Lankan English	Notes
"t" in "cat"	/t/	/t/	/ʈ/	
"d" in "lad"	/d/	/d/	/ɖ/	
"p" in "pull"	/pʰʊl/	/pʰʊl/	/pʊl/	the same applies to "t" and "k" at the beginning of a word or stressed syllable.
"th" in "this"	/ð/	/ð/	/d̪/	
"th" in "thin"	/θ/	/θ/	/t̪/	
"sh" in "ship"	/ʃ/	/ʃ/	/ɕ-/	
"ch" in "chin"	/tʃ/	/tʃ/	/ɕ-/	
"s" in "vision"	/ʒ/	/ʒ/	/ɕ-/	/ʒ/ is uncommon in Sinhala.
"z" in "zip"	/z/	/z/	/s/	/z/ is uncommon in Sinhala.
"w" and "v"	/w/, /v/	/w/, /v/	/ʋ/	

== Other features ==
Some elided syllables in English are pronounced in SLE. For example, "different" would be pronounced "diff-er-ent" (/ˈɖifərənʈ/) and "basically" would be pronounced "bay-si-cal-ly" (/ˈbesəkəli/). Also, some syllables normally unstressed and sounded as /ə/ may be sounded as /a(ː)/ (or, /o/, /u/, /e/, or /i/). For example, the word "camera" (/ˈkæmərə/) may become /ˈkæməra(ː)/.

In SLE, the first syllable may be emphasised rather than the usual second or third. Examples include "address", "cassette", "dessert", "museum", "hotel", and "gazette". One may also see differences in the allocation of primary and secondary syllable stresses. However, in SLE, usual British English pronunciations are favored over American English pronunciations.

Other examples of words pronounced differently in Sri Lankan English
Example	English	American	Sri Lankan English	Notes
"a" in "villa"	/ˈvɪlə/	/ˈvɪlə/	/ˈʋila(ː)/	
"w" in "welcome"	/ˈwɛlkəm/	/ˈwɛlkəm/	/ˈʋelkam/	
"wholesome"	/ˈhəʊlsəm/	/ˈhoʊlsəm/	/ˈhoːlsam/	
"polite"	/pəˈlaɪt/	/pəˈlaɪt/	/poˈlaɪʈ/	
"promote"	/prəˈməʊt/	/prəˈmoʊt/	/proˈmoːʈ/	
"today"	/təˈdeɪ/	/təˈdeɪ/	/ʈuˈɖeː/	
"together"	/təˈgɛðə(r)/	/təˈgɛðər/	/ʈuˈged̪ə(r)/	
"commentary"	/ˈkɒməntri/	/ˈkɑːmənˌteri/	/ˈkɒmenʈri/	
"compensate"	/ˈkɒmpənˌseɪt/	/ˈkɑːmpənˌseɪt/	/ˈkɒmpenˌseːʈ/	
"pencil"	/ˈpɛnsəl/	/ˈpɛnsəl/	/ˈpensil/	
"council "	/ˈkaʊnsəl/	/ˈkaʊnsəl/	/ˈkaʊnsil/	
"quarter"	/ˈkwɔːtə(r)/	/ˈkwɔrtər/	/ˈkʋaːʈə(r)/	
"s" in "cabs"	/kæbz/	/kæbz/	/kæbs/	the "s" of at the end of plurals is pronounced with an "s" sound rather than the usual "z" sound. Other examples are, "rings", "clothes", "mangoes", and "discos". The same applies to "is", "nose", and "houses".
"es" in "masses"	/ˈmæsɪz/	/ˈmæsɪz/	–	Where a plural ends in "es", "/-ɪz/" tends to be used. Other examples include "wishes" and "judges".
"ed" in "knocked"	/nɒkt/	/nɑːkt/	/nɒkɖ/	Similar change is heard with "passed", "finished", "wanted", and "landed".
"ed" in "landed"	/ˈlændɪd/	/ˈlændɪd/	/lænɖəɖ/	the same may apply after "t", "s", "g", and "n".
"et" in "pocket"	/ˈpɒkɪt/	/ˈpɑːkɪt/	/ˈpɒkəʈ/	Other examples where "et" is unstressed and pronounced in this way include "market" and "biscuit".
"th" in "healthy"	/ˈhɛlθi/	/ˈhɛlθi/	/ˈhelði/	Also "wealthy".
"r" in "care"	/kɛə(r)/	/kɛr/	/kea(r)/	Also "air", "fare", "pear", and so on.
"w" in "power"	/ˈpaʊə(r)/	/ˈpaʊər/	/ˈpaʋə(r)/	Also "tower" and "flower".
"w" in "twist"	/twɪst/	/twɪst/	/ʈʋisʈ/	Also applies to "quick".
"a" in "damage"	/ˈdæmɪdʒ/	/ˈdæmɪdʒ/	/ˈɖæmeːdʒ/	Other examples include "marriage", "manager", "village", and "college".
"a" in "delicate"	/ˈdɛlɪkɪt/	/ˈdɛlɪkɪt/	/ˈɖelikeːʈ/	Other examples include "accurate", "examine", "example", and "enamel".
"i" in "video"	/ˈvɪdiˌəʊ/	/ˈvɪdiˌoʊ/	/ˈʋiːɖiˌoː/	Other examples include "competition" and "electrician".
"of"	/əv/	/əv/	/ɒf/	
"vehicle"	/ˈviːɪkəl/	/ˈviːɪkəl/	/ˈʋehikəl/	
"husband"	/ˈhʌzbənd/	/ˈhʌzbənd/	/ˈhasbənɖ/	
"tuition"	/tjuˈɪʃən/	/tuˈɪʃən/	/ˈʈjuːɕən/	
"poem"	/ˈpəʊɪm/	/ˈpoʊəm/	/ˈpojəm/	Also "poet".
"drawer"	/dɹɔː(ɹ)/	/dɹɔɹ/	/ˈdɹɔːjə(ɹ)/	

== Major publications ==
- The Postcolonial Identity of Sri Lankan English by Manique Gunesekera
- A Dictionary of Sri Lankan English by Michael Meyler

== See also ==
- Commonwealth English
- Regional accents of English speakers
