= Bhutanese cuisine =

Culinary traditions of Bhutan

An assortment of Bhutanese foods, with Bhutanese red rice in the center.

A staple of Bhutanese cuisine is Bhutanese red rice, which is like brown rice in texture, but has a nutty taste. It is the only variety of rice that grows at high altitudes. Other staples include buckwheat and increasingly maize.

== Regional cuisines ==
Buckwheat is eaten mainly in Bumthang, maize in the eastern districts, and rice is eaten across the country. The diet in the hills also includes chicken, yak meat, dried beef, pork, pork fat, and lamb. Soups and stews of meat, rice, fiddleheads, lentils, and dried vegetables, spiced with chili peppers and cheese, are a favorite meal during the cold seasons. Zow shungo is a rice dish mixed with leftover vegetables. Ema datshi is a spicy dish made with large or small green or red chili peppers in a cheesy sauce (similar to chile con queso), which might be called the national dish for its ubiquity and the pride that the Bhutanese have for it. Other foods include jasha maru (a chicken dish), phaksha paa (dried pork cooked with chili peppers, spices, and vegetables, including turnips, greens, or radishes), thukpa, puta (buckwheat noodles), bathup, and fried rice.

== Dishes ==
- Bjashamaru: chicken in butter with garlic.
- Dāl bhāt (Nepali: दाल भात): a Nepali traditional dish, also popular in Bhutan, especially the south, consisting of steamed rice and dal (pulses).
- Ema datshi (Dzongkha: ཨེ་མ་དར་ཚིལ་; Wylie: e-ma dar-tshil): a stew of hot chili peppers and cheese, and the national dish of Bhutan.
- Gondomaru: scrambled eggs and cheese in butter.
- Momos: steamed dumplings, also a part of Nepali and Tibetan cuisine.
- Noshahuentsu: pork and spinach.
- Phagshaphintshom: pork in rice noodles.
- Phagshaphu: pork, radishes, and chilies.
- Sicum paa: dried pork with chilies.
- Tsampa (Tibetan: རྩམ་པ་, Wylie: rtsam pa): a Tibetan porridge.

== Snacks ==
Popular snacks include momo (Bhutanese dumplings), Hoentay (Buckwheat dumplings), shakam ezay (eezay), khabzey (dried fritters made with flour, water, and sugar, which are then deep-fried), shabalay, juma (Bhutanese sausages marinated in spices), and noodles.

== Foreign influences ==
Restaurants in the country can serve Chinese, Nepalese, Tibetan and Indian foods, which are very popular and in recent years Korean restaurants have opened due to the increasing popularity of Korean popular culture in the country.

== Dairy and beverages ==
Dairy foods, particularly butter and cheese from yaks and cows, are also popular, and most milk is turned into butter and cheese. Cheese made from cow's milk called datshi is a traditional cottage cheese and widely consumed in Bhutan. Mature datshi, made in the Eastern districts, is known as zoetay, and is normally greenish in colour and has a strong smell.

A hardened yak milk cheese, chhurpi (or chugo), is produced in small cubes. Chhurpi is incredibly popular and is chewed or sucked throughout the day, especially in rural areas. It is one of the hardest cheeses in the world.

Other types of cheese include Western types like cheddar and gouda. Western cheese is made in the Swiss Cheese Factory in Jakar or imported from India. Popular beverages include butter tea prepared using tea leaves, salt and butter (suja), milk tea (ngaja), black tea, locally brewed ara (rice wine), and beer. Spices include curry, cardamom, ginger, thingay (Sichuan pepper), garlic, turmeric, and caraway.

Bhutanese dishes and foods

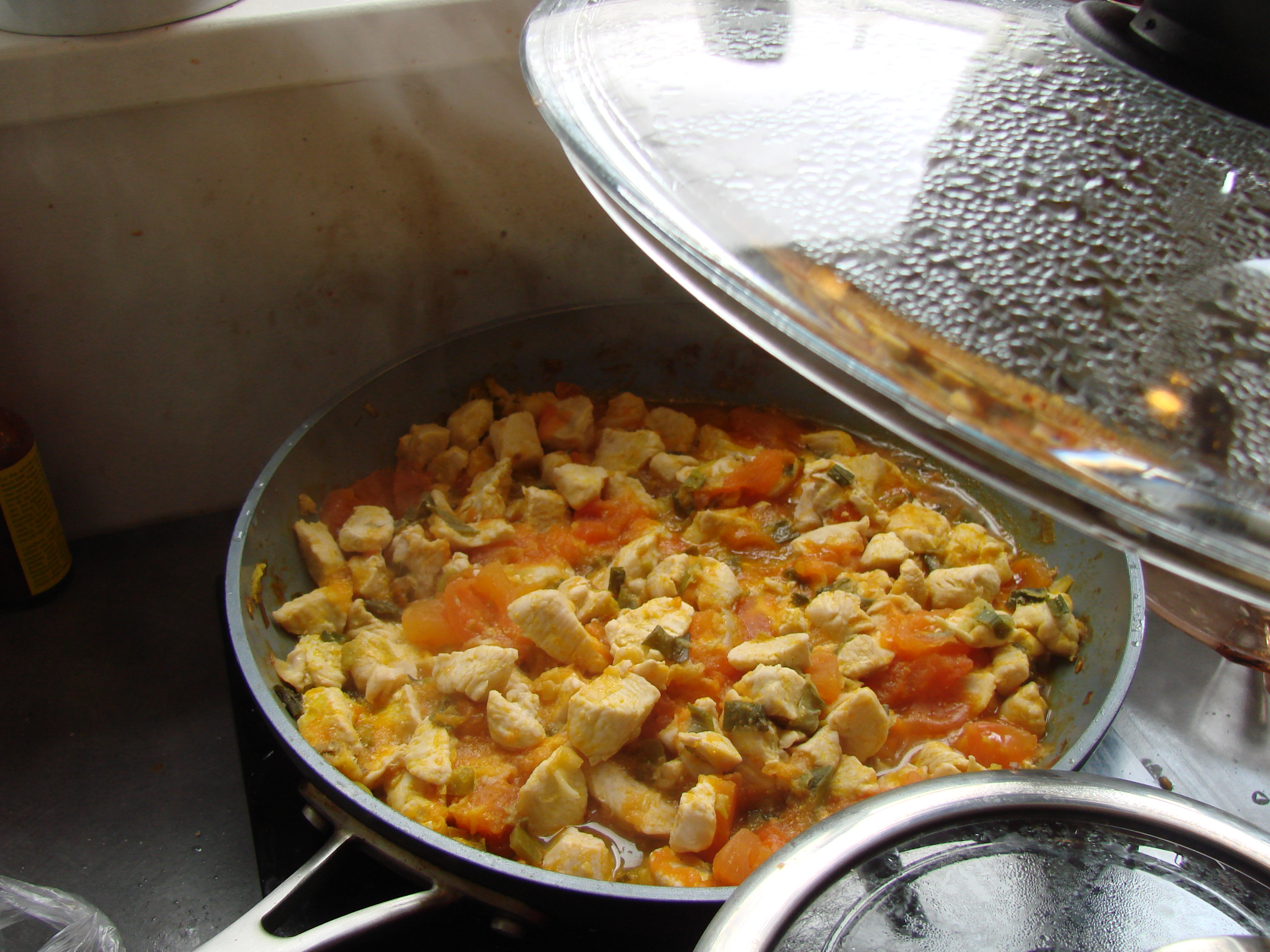
Jasha maru, a traditional dish consisting of minced chicken, tomatoes, and other ingredients

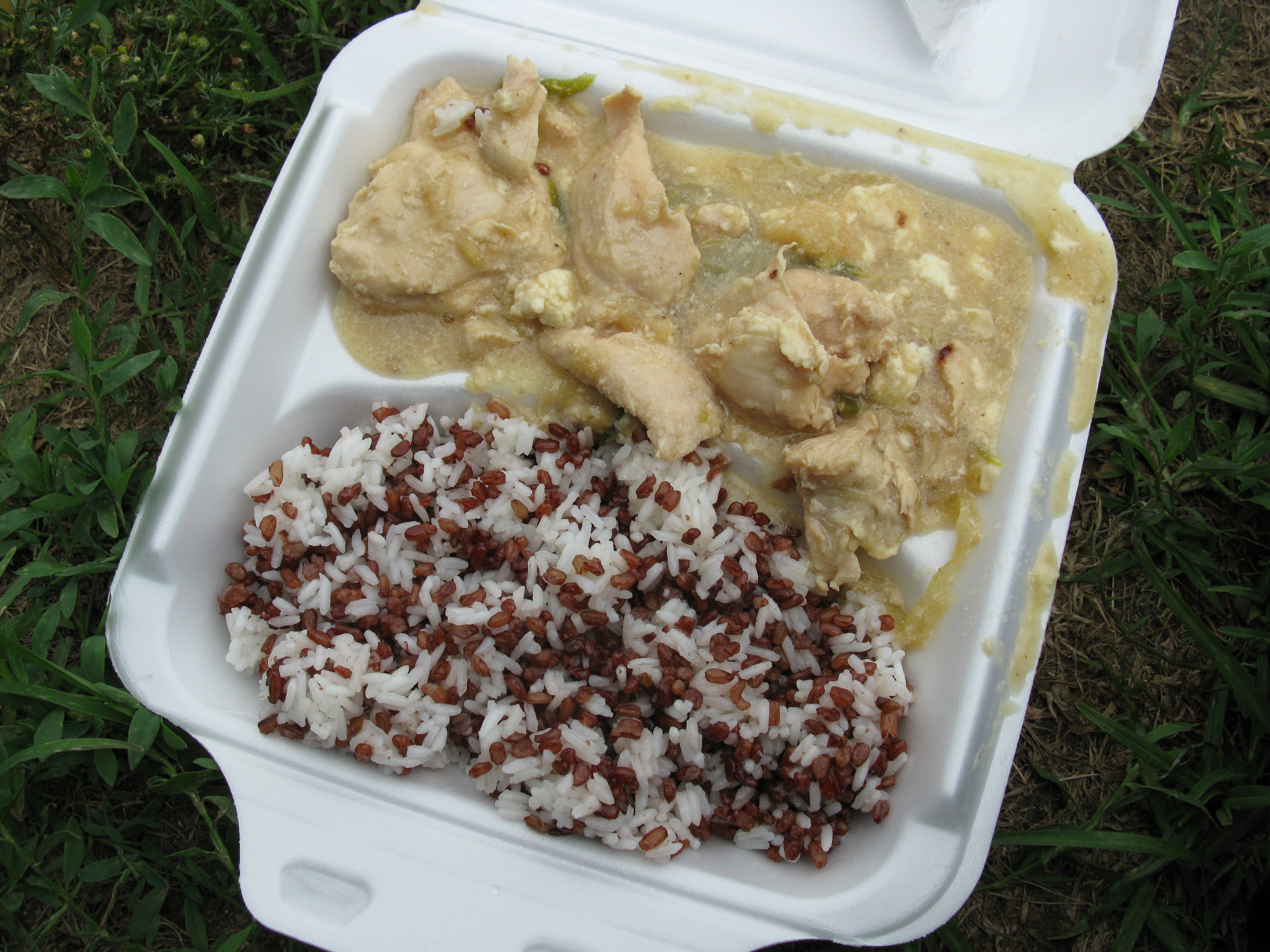
Jasha tshoem, Bhutanese chicken curry

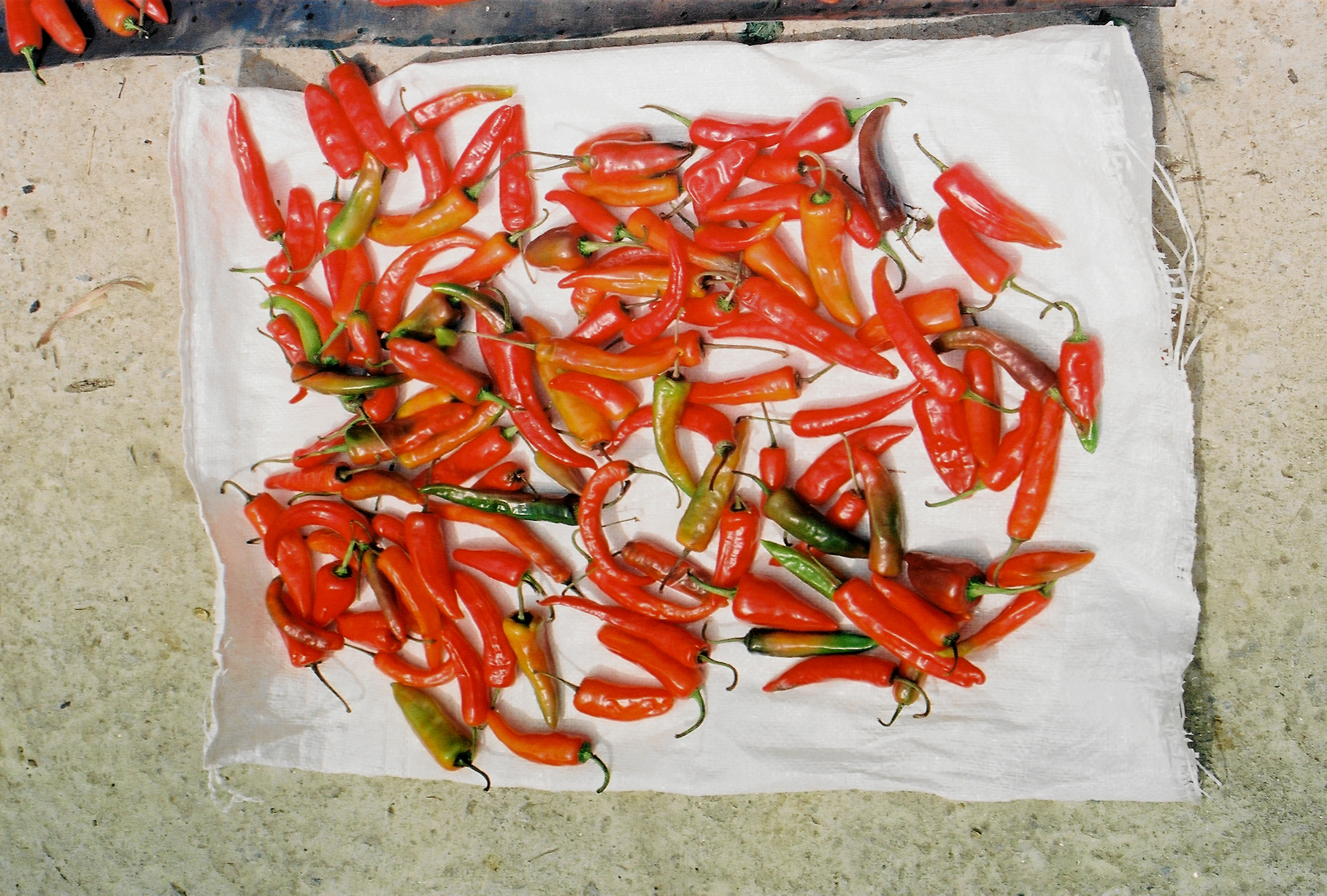
Bhutanese chili peppers at a market in Thimphu

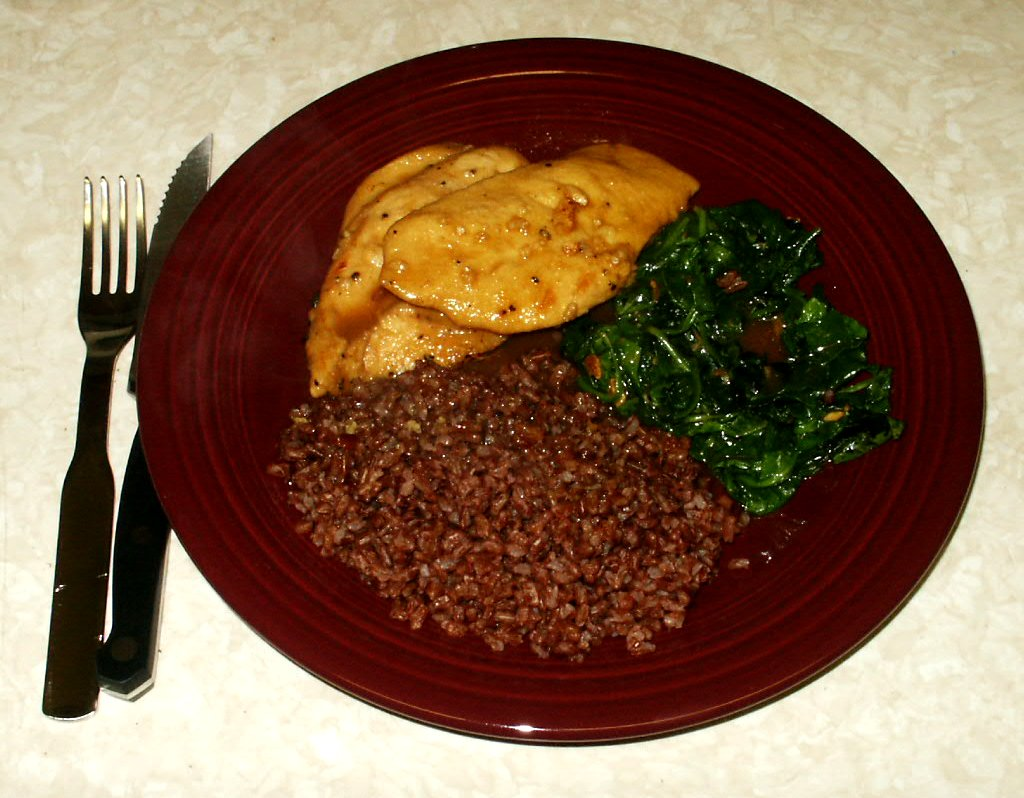
Traditional dish with lemon glazed chicken, sauteed spinach and steamed Bhutanese red rice

== Etiquette ==
When offered food, one says meshu meshu, covering one's mouth with the hands in refusal according to Bhutanese manners, and then gives in on the second or third offer.

== See also ==
- Dal
- Tsheringma tea
- Yak butter
