= Cheese =

Curdled milk food product

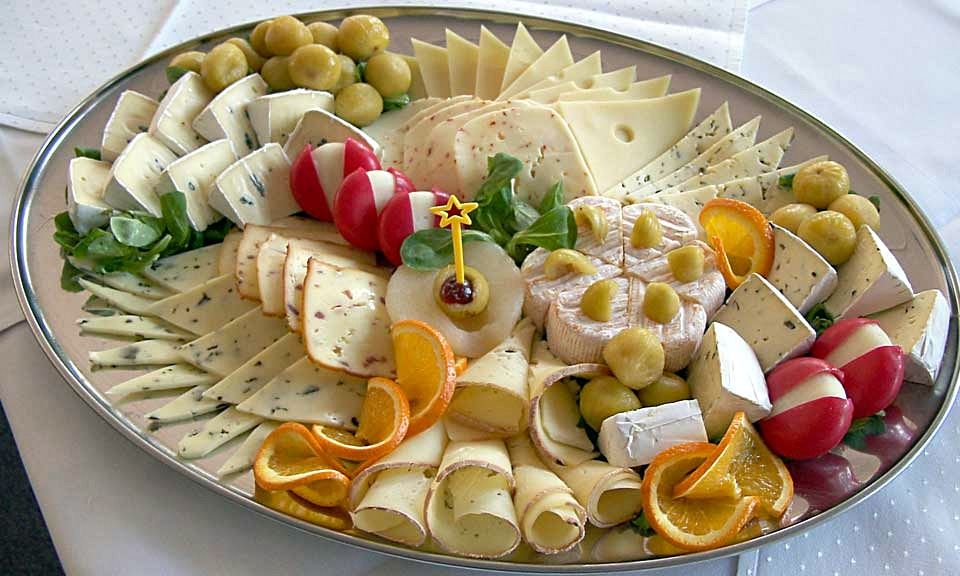
- A platter with cheese and Garnish
- Type: Dairy
- Place of origin: The Middle East and Fertile Crescent
- Main ingredients: Milk
- Variations: Blue cheese, Cheese with holes, and more
- Food energy (per serving): 60 to 135 kcal (250 to 560 kJ)

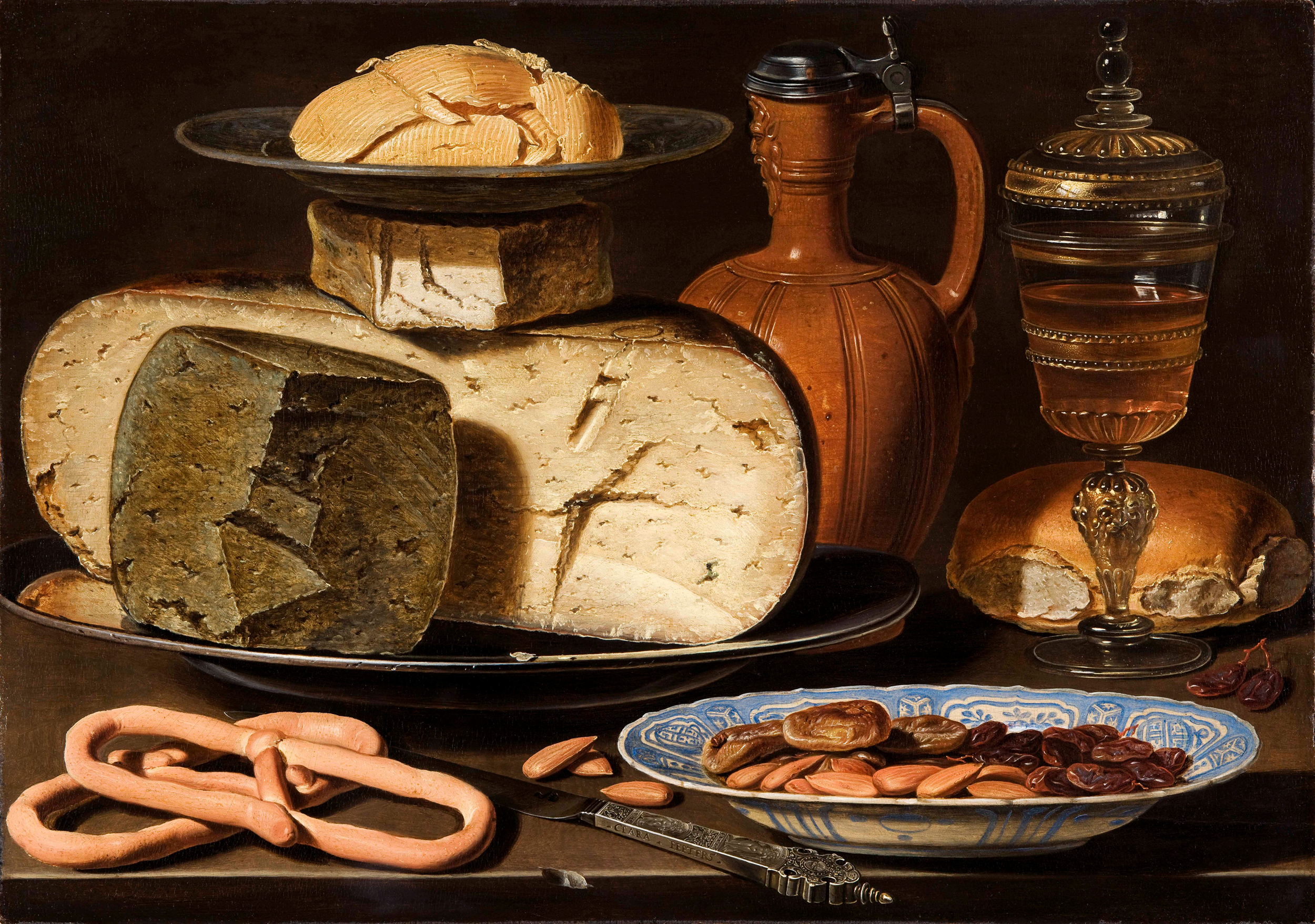
Cheeses in art: Still Life with Cheeses, Almonds and Pretzels, Clara Peeters, c. 1615

Cheese is a type of dairy product produced in a range of flavors, textures, and forms by curdling of milk, usually from cows, goats or sheep, and sometimes of water buffalo. During production, milk is usually acidified and either the enzymes of rennet or bacterial enzymes with similar activity are added to cause the protein casein to coagulate. The solid curds, consisting of proteins and milkfat, are then separated from the liquid whey and pressed into finished cheese. Some cheeses have aromatic molds on the outer layer or rind, while others have them throughout.

Over a thousand types of cheese exist, produced in various countries. Their styles, textures and flavors depend on the origin of the milk (including the animal's diet), whether they have been pasteurised, the butterfat content, the bacteria and mold, the processing, and how long they have been aged. Herbs, spices, or wood smoke may be used as flavoring agents. Other added ingredients may include black pepper, garlic, chives or cranberries. A cheesemonger, or specialist seller of cheeses, may have expertise with selecting, purchasing, receiving, storing and ripening cheeses.

Most cheeses are acidified by bacteria, which turn milk sugars into lactic acid; the addition of rennet completes the curdling. Vegetarian varieties of rennet are available; most are produced through fermentation by the fungus Mucor miehei, but others have been extracted from Cynara thistles. For a few cheeses, the milk is curdled by adding acids such as vinegar or lemon juice.

Cheese is valued for its portability, long shelf life, and high content of fat, protein, calcium, and phosphorus. Cheese is more compact and has a longer shelf life than milk. Hard cheeses, such as Cheddar and Parmesan, last longer than soft cheeses, such as Brie or goat's milk cheese. The long storage life of some cheeses, especially when encased in a protective rind, allows producers to sell when markets are favourable. Vacuum packaging of block-shaped cheeses and gas-flushing of plastic bags with mixtures of carbon dioxide and nitrogen are used for storage and mass distribution of cheeses in the 21st century, compared with the paper and twine that was used in the 20th and 19th century.

A cheesemonger is a tradesperson who specializes in cheese by selling, curating, and caring for it.

== Etymology ==
The word cheese comes from Latin caseus, from which the modern word casein is derived. The earliest source is the conjectured proto-Indo-European root *kwat-, which means "to ferment, become sour". That gave rise to cīese or cēse (in Old English) and chese (in Middle English).

== History ==
=== Origins ===
The origins of cheese predate recorded history. There is no conclusive evidence indicating where cheesemaking originated, whether in Europe, Central Asia or the Middle East. The earliest proposed dates for the origin of cheesemaking range from around 8000 BCE, when sheep were first domesticated. Because animal skins and inflated internal organs have provided storage vessels for a range of foodstuffs since ancient times, it is probable that the process of cheese making was discovered accidentally by storing milk in a container made from the stomach of an animal, resulting in the milk being turned to curd and whey by the rennet from the stomach. There is a legend—with variations—about the discovery of cheese by an Arab trader who used this method of storing milk.

The earliest evidence of cheesemaking in the archaeological record dates back to 5500 BCE and is found in what is now Kuyavia, Poland, where strainers coated with milk-fat molecules have been found. The earliest evidence of cheesemaking in the Mediterranean dates back to 5200 BCE, on the coast of the Dalmatia region of Croatia.

Cheesemaking may have begun independently of this by the pressing and salting of curdled milk to preserve it. Observation that the effect of making cheese in an animal stomach gave more solid and better-textured curds may have led to the deliberate addition of rennet.

=== Mesopotamia, Egypt and China ===
In Mesopotamian mythology, Inanna, goddess of fertility, love, the seasons and harvest, after wanting to marry Enkimdu, a farmer god, against her brother, sun god Utu's will, is petitioned by Dumuzi, the shepherd god, to marry him instead. In his petition Dumuzi compared between his own products: rich milk, yogurt, butter (or ghee) honey cheese and small cheeses, with those of the farmer: bread beans and dates, and concluded with the argument that he produces so much dairy that the human farmer could live off the surplus, Inanna was ultimately convinced and married Dumuzi. In another myth Inanna promised Dumuzi that she would preserve his storehouse in return for provisions of fresh milk, cream and cheese. As a result, cheese figured prominently in the long lived sacred marriage rite of the Dumuzi-Inanna cult, in which the king of Uruk, symbolizing Dumuzi, supplied Inanna, probably represented by a priestess, with cheese and cream, thereby securing her blessing for the following year. This rite was adopted by additional Sumerian cities such as Nippur, Ur and Isin, and evolved over time and place into different forms. It became the Akkadian sacred marriage rites between Nanna and Ningal, developed into that of Ningirsu and Bab, and Nanse and Nindar, and eventually into the Semitic-Akkadian rite of Tammuz-Ishtar which persisted into the common era. Numerous seals and tablets found in Inanna's temple serve as testimony to the annual quotas of cheese and butter herders were required to deliver to the goddess.

Early archeological evidence of Egyptian cheese has been found in Egyptian tomb murals, dating to about 2000 BCE. A 2018 scientific paper stated that cheese dating to approximately 1200 BCE was found in ancient Egyptian tombs.

The earliest ever discovered preserved cheese was found on mummies in Xiaohe Cemetery in the Taklamakan Desert in Xinjiang, China, dating back as early as 1615 BCE.

=== Ancient Greece and Rome ===
Ancient Greek mythology credited Aristaeus with the discovery of cheese. Homer's Odyssey (8th century BCE) describes the monstrous Cyclops making and storing sheep's and goats' milk cheese (translation by Samuel Butler):

We soon reached his cave, but he was out shepherding, so we went inside and took stock of all that we could see. His cheese-racks were loaded with cheeses, and he had more lambs and kids than his pens could hold...

When he had so done he sat down and milked his ewes and goats, all in due course, and then let each of them have her own young. He curdled half the milk and set it aside in wicker strainers.

Columella's De Re Rustica (c. 65 CE) details a cheesemaking process involving rennet coagulation, pressing of the curd, salting, and aging. According to Pliny the Elder, it had become a sophisticated enterprise by the time the Roman Empire came into being. Pliny the Elder mentions in his writings Caseus Helveticus, a hard cheese produced by the Helvetii. Cheese was an everyday food and cheesemaking a mature art in the Roman empire. Pliny's Natural History (77 CE) devotes a chapter (XI, 97) to describing the diversity of cheeses enjoyed by Romans of the early Empire. He stated that the best cheeses came from the villages near Nîmes, but did not keep long and had to be eaten fresh. Cheeses of the Alps and Apennines were as remarkable for their variety then as now. A Ligurian cheese was noted for being made mostly from sheep's milk, and some cheeses produced nearby were stated to weigh as much as a thousand pounds each. Goats' milk cheese was a recent taste in Rome, improved over the "medicinal taste" of Gaul's similar cheeses by smoking. Of cheeses from overseas, Pliny preferred those of Bithynia in Asia Minor.

=== Post-Roman Europe ===
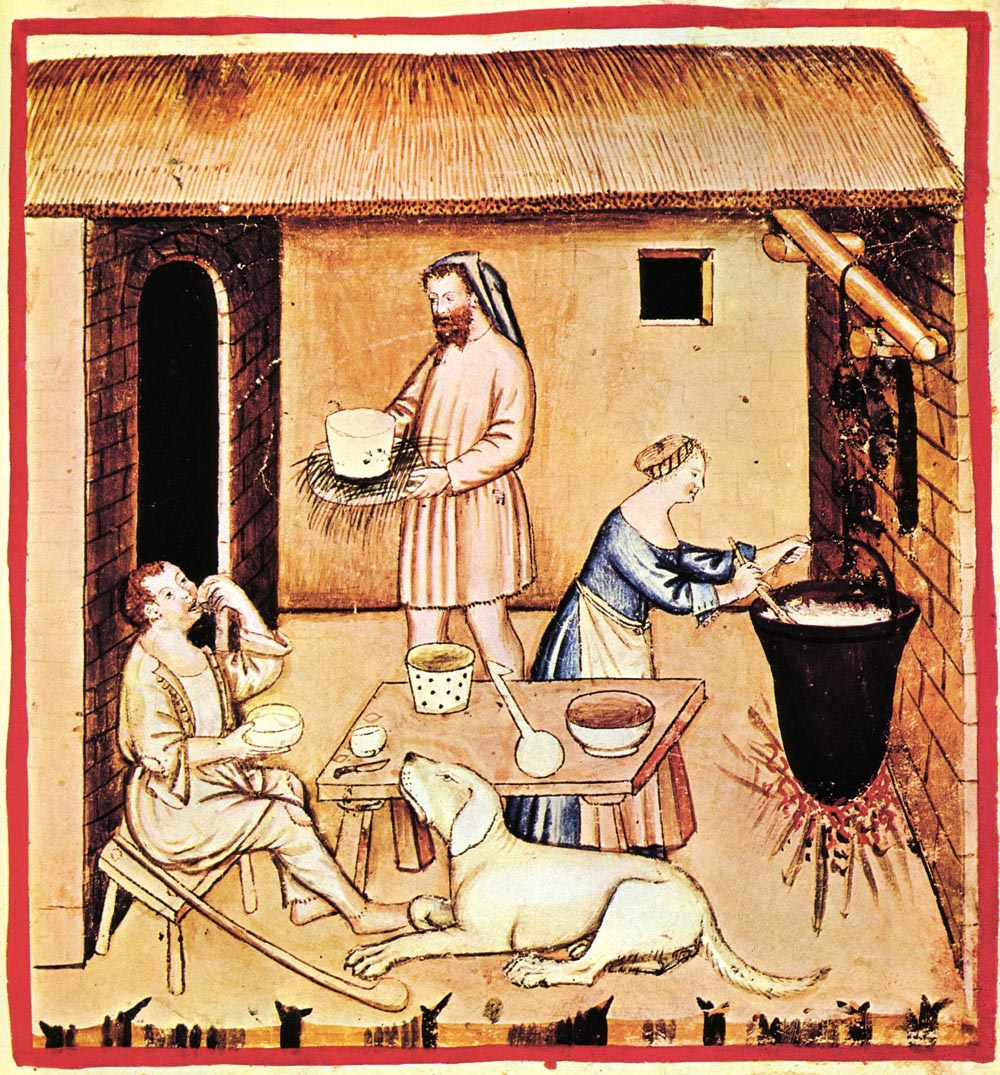
Cheese, Tacuinum sanitatis Casanatensis (14th century)

c. 1000, Anglo-Saxons in England named a village by the River Thames Ceswican, meaning "Cheese farm". In 1022, it is mentioned that Vlach (Aromanian) shepherds from Thessaly and the Pindus mountains, in modern Greece, provided cheese for Constantinople. Many cheeses popular today were first recorded in the late Middle Ages or after. Cheeses such as Cheddar around 1500, Parmesan in 1597, Gouda in 1697, and Camembert in 1791 show post-Middle Ages dates.

In 1546, The Proverbs of John Heywood claimed "the moon is made of a green cheese" (Greene may refer here not to the color, as many now think, but to being new or unaged). Variations on this sentiment were long repeated and NASA exploited this myth for an April Fools' Day spoof announcement in 2006.

=== Modern era ===
Until its modern spread along with European culture, cheese was nearly unheard of in east Asian cultures and in the pre-Columbian Americas and had only limited use in sub-Mediterranean Africa, mainly being widespread and popular only in the Middle East, Tibet, and the Indian subcontinent in the form of Paneer. But with the spread, first of European imperialism, and later of Euro-American culture and food, cheese has gradually become known and increasingly popular worldwide.

The first factory for the industrial production of cheese opened in Switzerland in 1815, but large-scale production first found real success in the United States. Credit usually goes to Jesse Williams, a dairy farmer from Rome, New York, who in 1851 started making cheese in an assembly-line fashion using the milk from neighboring farms; this made cheddar-like cheese one of the first US industrial foods. Within decades, hundreds of such commercial dairy associations existed.

The 1860s saw the beginnings of mass-produced rennet, and by the turn of the century scientists were producing pure microbial cultures. Before then, bacteria in cheesemaking had come from the environment or from recycling an earlier batch's whey; the pure cultures meant a more standardized cheese could be produced.

Factory-made cheese overtook traditional cheesemaking in the World War II era, and factories have been the source of most cheese in America and Europe ever since. By 2012, cheese was one of the most shoplifted items from supermarkets worldwide.

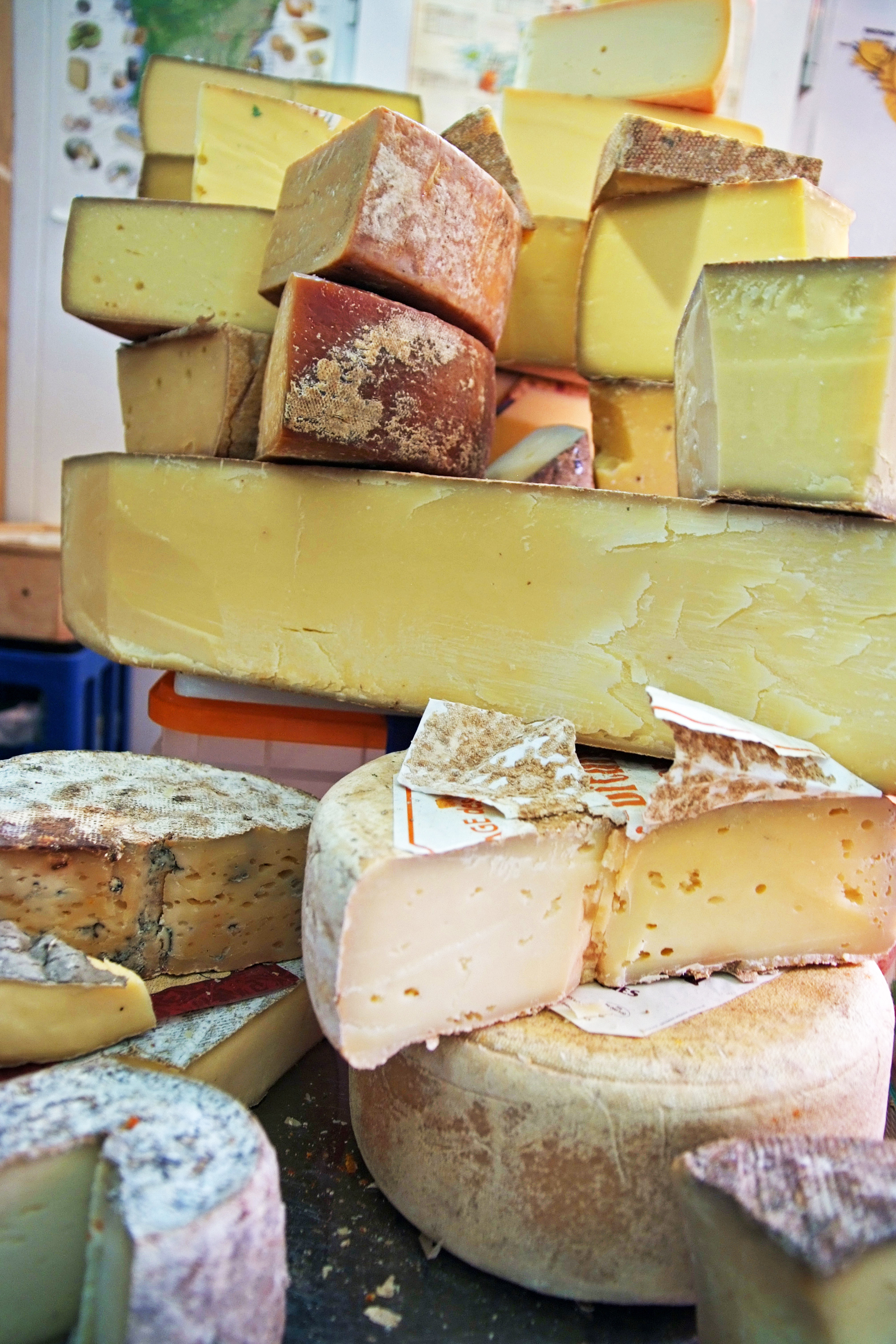
Hard cheeses in Germany

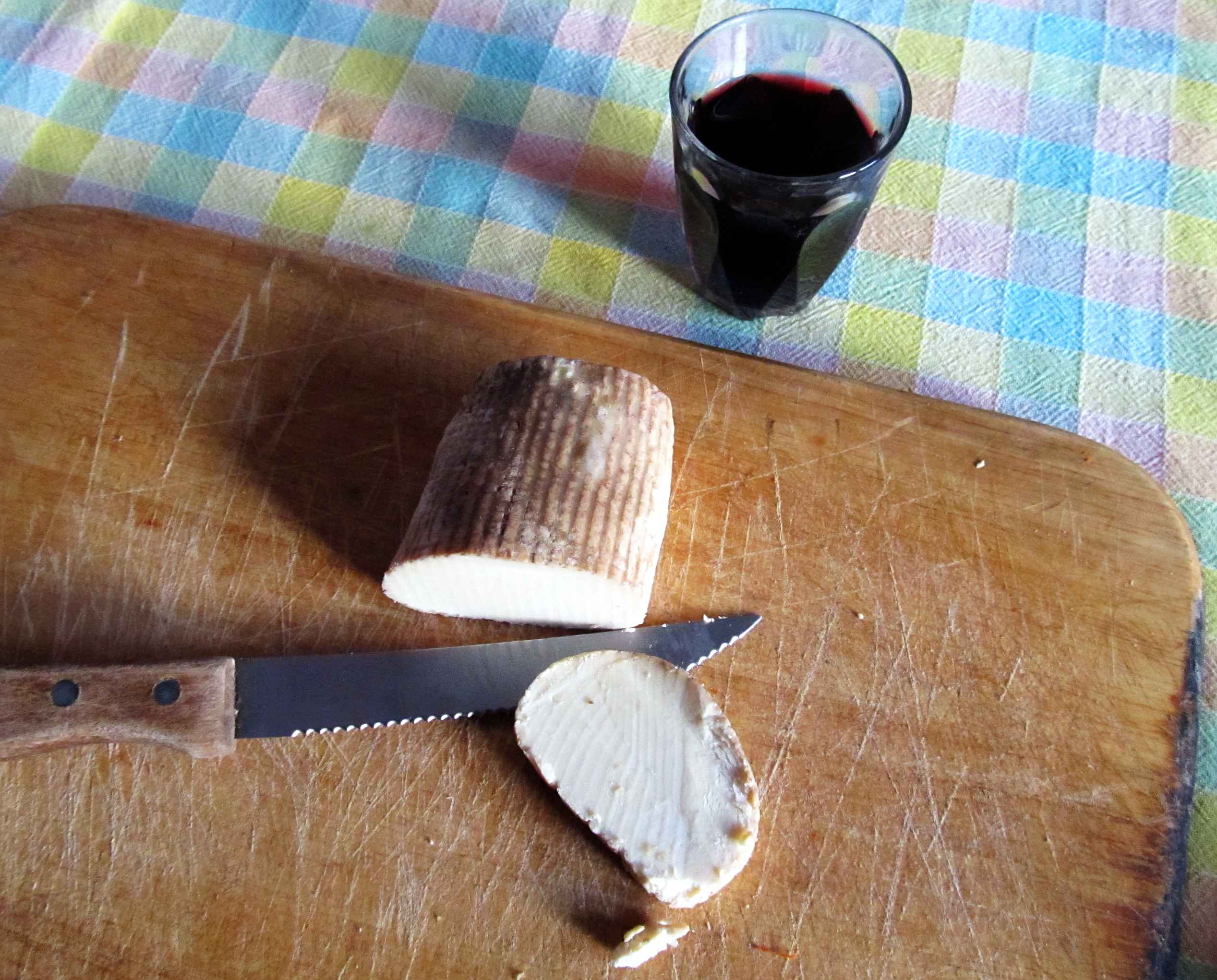
A piece of soft curd cheese, oven-baked to increase shelf life

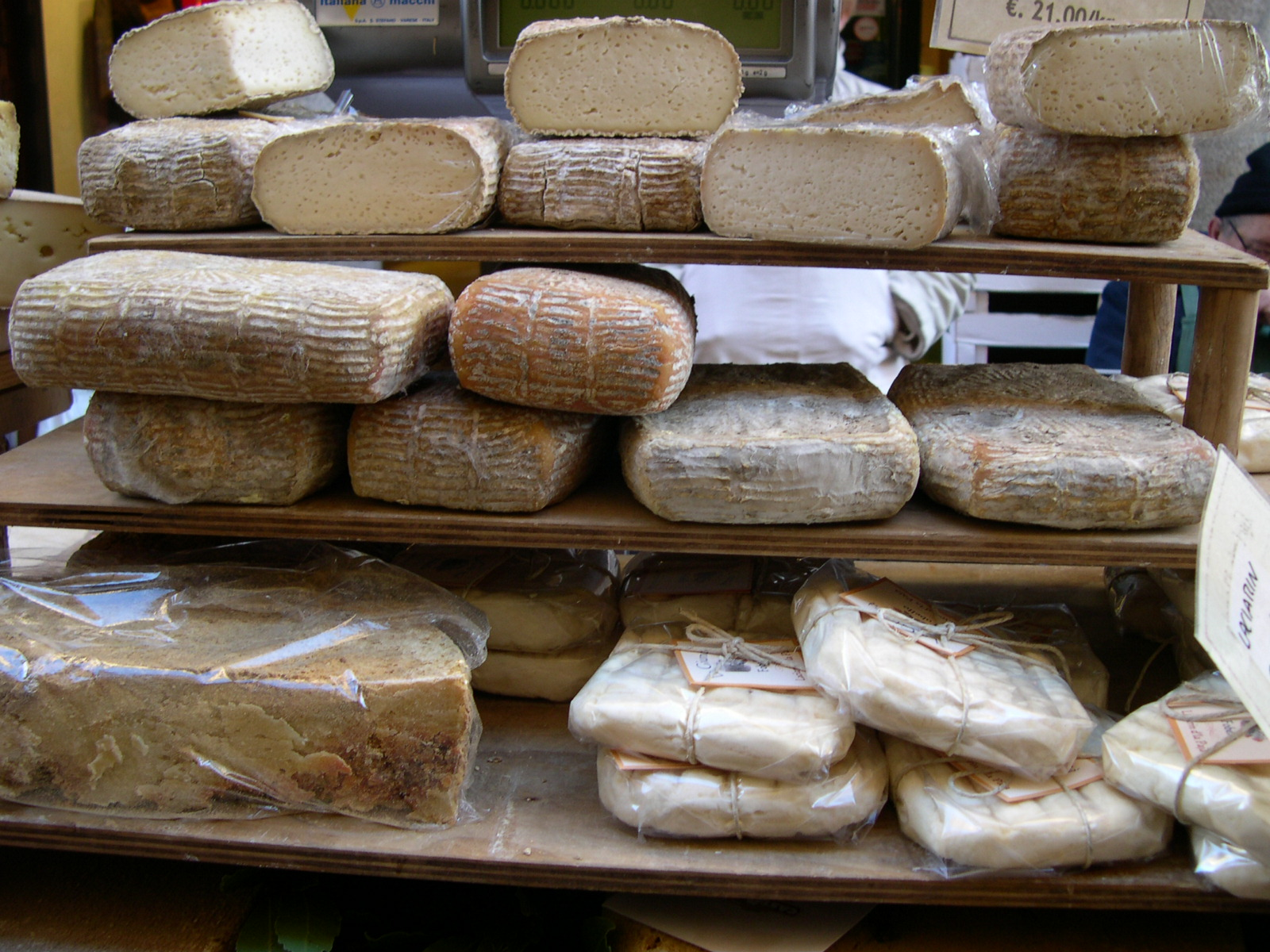
Cheese in a market in Italy

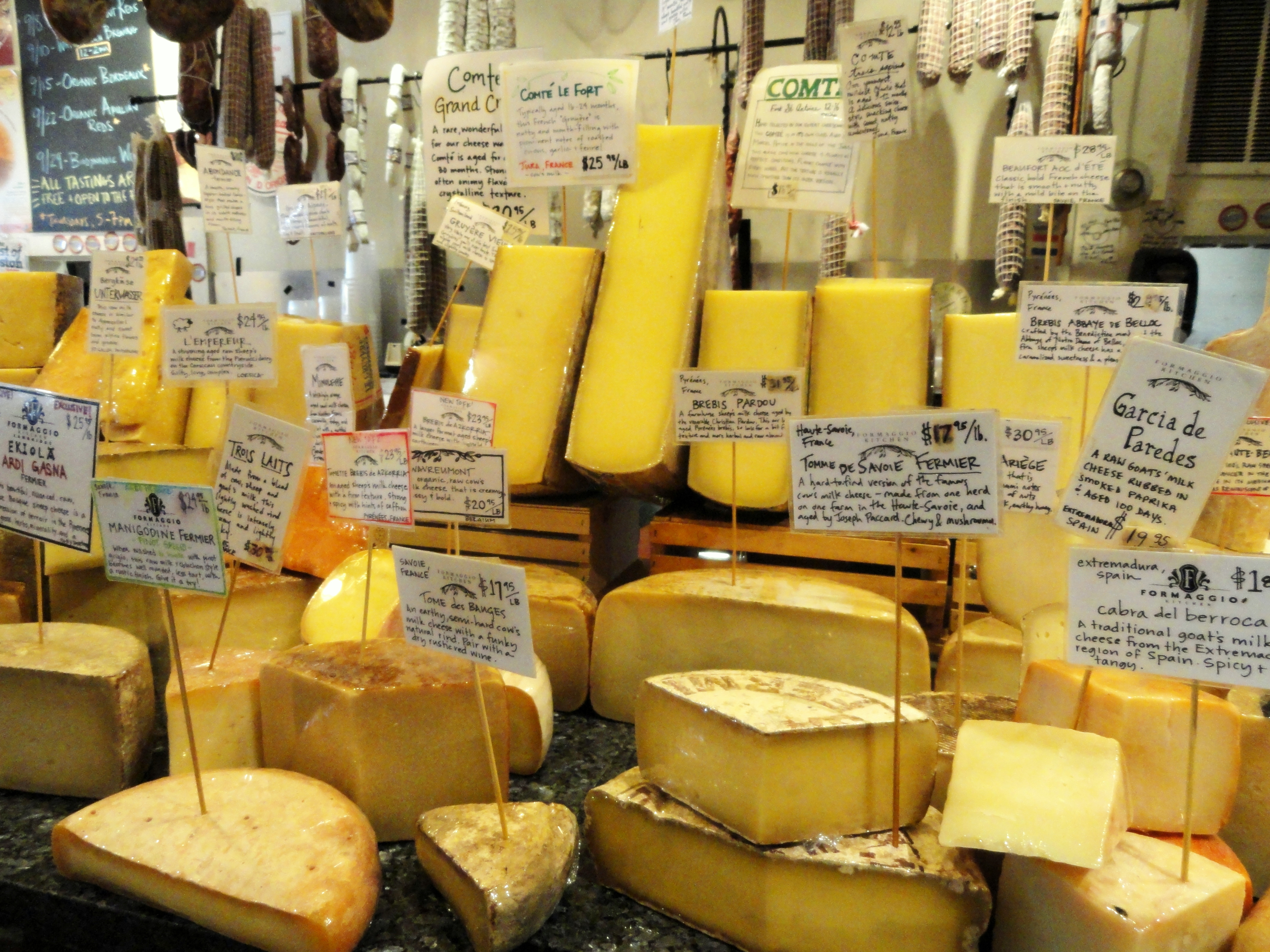
Cheese display in grocery store, United States

== Production ==
Largest producers of cheese and curd (2024)
Rank	Country	Production (tonnes)
1	United States	6,400,000
2	Germany	2,700,000
3	France	2,000,000
4	Italy	1,400,000
5	Netherlands	1,000,000
Source: FAOSTAT of the United Nations

In 2022, world production of cheese from whole cow milk was 22.6 million tonnes, with the United States accounting for 28% of the total, followed by Germany, France, Italy and the Netherlands as secondary producers (table).

As of 2021, the carbon footprint of a kilogram of cheese ranged from 6 to 12 kg of CO_{2}eq, depending on the amount of milk used; accordingly, it is generally lower than beef or lamb, but higher than other foods.

Production of cheese

Per capita production of cheese

=== Consumption ===
France, Iceland, Finland, Denmark and Germany were the highest consumers of cheese in 2014, averaging 25 kg (55 lb) per person per annum.

== Processing ==
=== Curdling ===
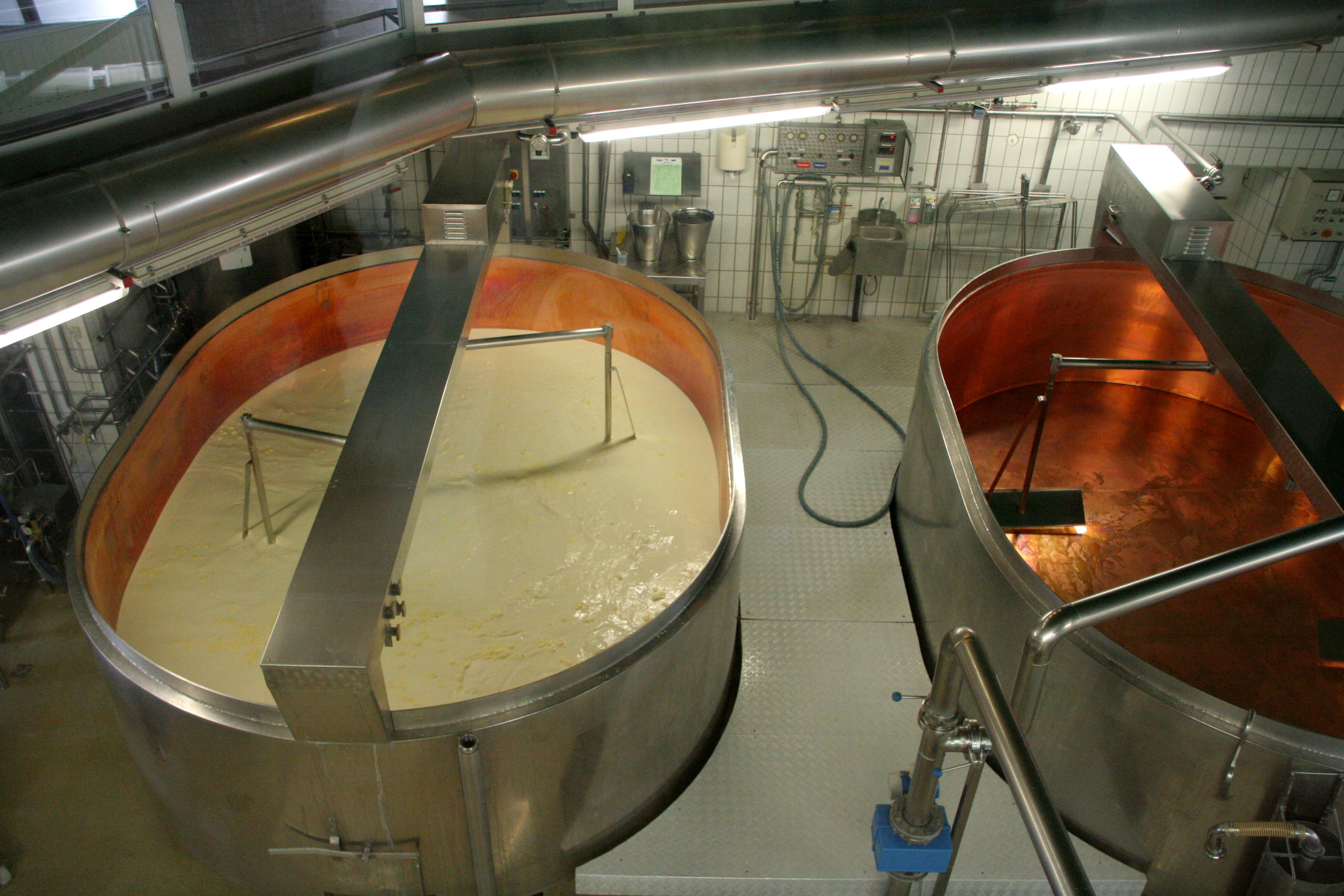
In industrial production of Emmental cheese, the as-yet-undrained curd is broken by rotating mixers.

A required step in cheesemaking is to separate the milk into solid curds and liquid whey. Usually this is done by acidifying (souring) the milk and adding rennet. The acidification can be accomplished directly by the addition of an acid, such as vinegar, in a few cases (paneer, queso fresco). More commonly starter bacteria are employed instead which convert milk sugars into lactic acid. The same bacteria (and the enzymes they produce) play a large role in the eventual flavor of aged cheeses. Most cheeses are made with starter bacteria from the Lactococcus, Lactobacillus, or Streptococcus genera.

Swiss starter cultures include Propionibacterium freudenreichii, which produces propionic acid and carbon dioxide gas bubbles during aging, giving Emmental cheese its holes or eyes.

Some fresh cheeses are curdled only by acidity, but most cheeses have added rennet, which sets the cheese into a strong and rubbery gel compared to the fragile curds produced by acidic coagulation alone. It allows curdling at a lower acidity—important because flavor-making bacteria are inhibited in high-acidity environments. Curd made from rennet can release more whey than acid set curd, allowing for drier, harder, less acidic cheeses.

While rennet was traditionally produced via extraction from the inner mucosa of the fourth stomach chamber of slaughtered young, unweaned calves, most rennet used today in cheesemaking is produced recombinantly. The majority of the applied chymosin is retained in the whey and, at most, may be present in cheese in trace quantities. In ripe cheese, the type and provenance of chymosin used in production cannot be determined.

=== Curd processing ===
At this point, the cheese has set into a very moist gel. Some soft cheeses are now essentially complete: they are drained, salted, and packaged. For most of the rest, the curd is cut into small cubes. This allows water to drain from the individual pieces of curd.

Some hard cheeses are then heated to temperatures in the range of 35–55 °C (95–131 °F). This forces more whey from the cut curd, and changes the taste of the finished cheese, affecting both the bacterial culture and the milk chemistry. Cheeses that are heated to the higher temperatures are usually made with thermophilic starter bacteria that survive this step—either Lactobacilli or Streptococci.

Salt has roles in cheese besides adding a salty flavor. It preserves cheese from spoiling, draws moisture from the curd, and firms cheese's texture in an interaction with its proteins. Some cheeses are salted from the outside with dry salt or brine washes. Most cheeses have the salt mixed directly into the curds.

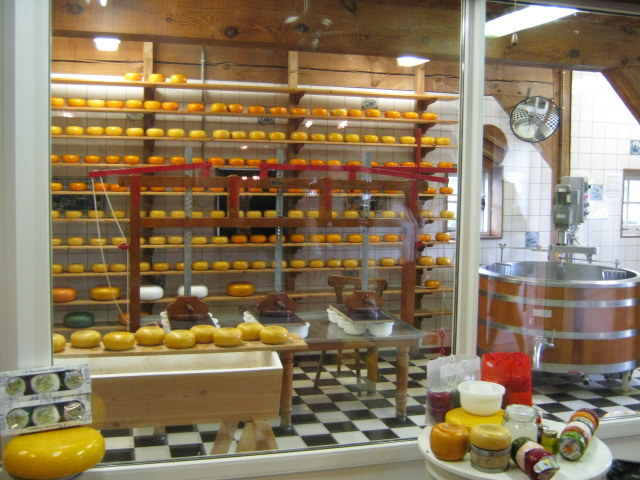
Cheese factory in Zaanstad, the Netherlands

Other techniques influence a cheese's texture and flavor, such as:

- Stretching (Mozzarella, Provolone): the curd is stretched and kneaded in hot water, developing a stringy, fibrous body.
- Cheddaring (Cheddar, other English cheeses): the cut curd is repeatedly piled up, pushing more moisture away. The curd is mixed (or milled) for a long time, taking the sharp edges off the cut curd pieces and influencing the final product's texture.
- Washing: (Edam, Gouda, Colby): the curd is washed in warm water, lowering its acidity and making for a milder-tasting cheese.

Most cheeses are given their final shape by pressing the curds into a mold or form: the more pressure is applied, the harder the cheese. The pressure drives out moisture—the molds are designed to allow water to escape—and unifies the curds into a single solid body.

=== Ripening ===
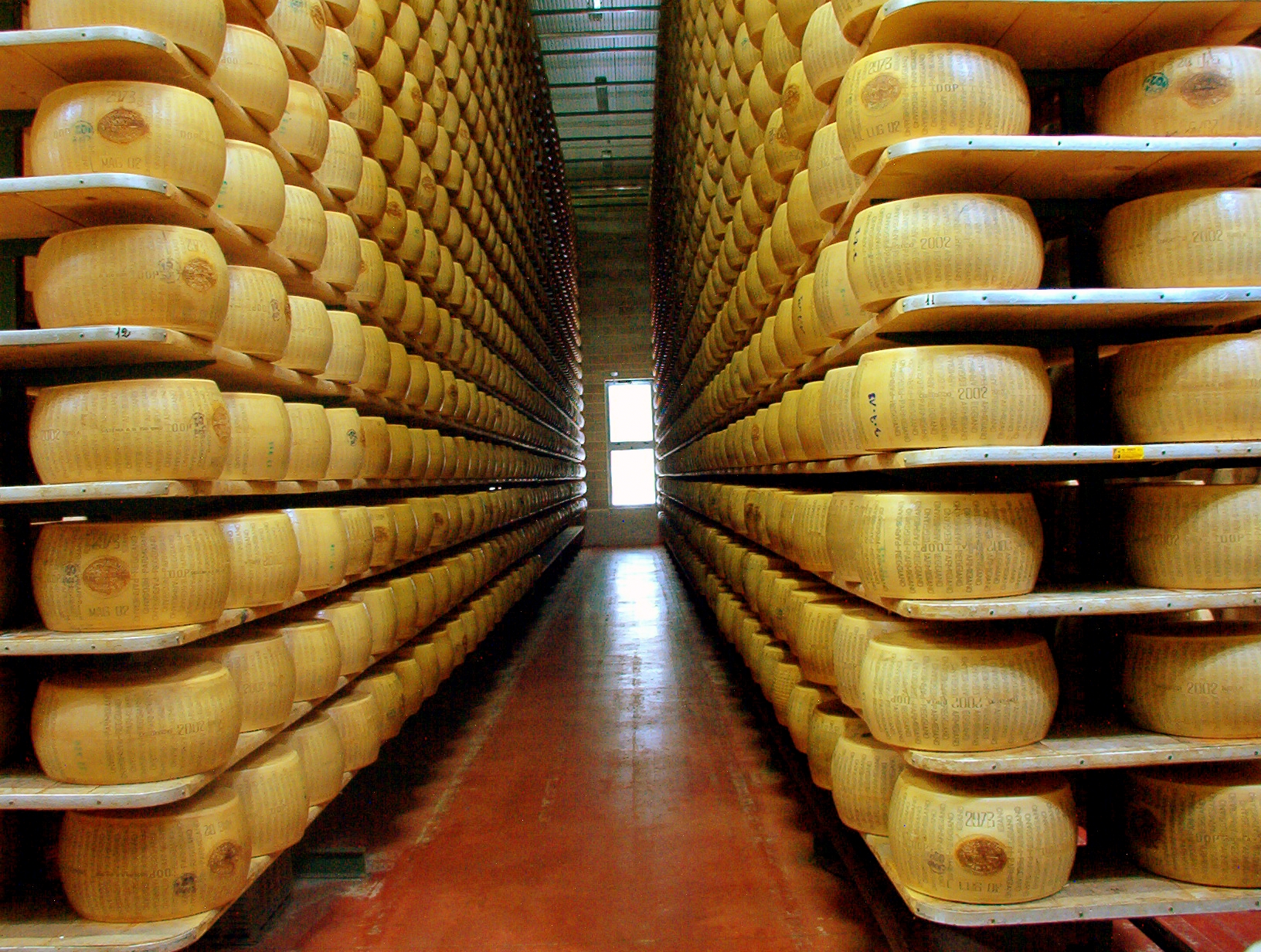
Parmigiano-Reggiano in a modern factory

A newborn cheese is usually salty yet bland in flavor and, for harder varieties, rubbery in texture. These qualities are sometimes enjoyed—cheese curds are eaten on their own—but normally cheeses are left to rest under controlled conditions. This aging period (called ripening, or, from the French, affinage) lasts from a few days to several years. As a cheese ages, microbes and enzymes transform texture and intensify flavor. This transformation is largely a result of the breakdown of casein proteins and milkfat into a complex mix of amino acids, amines, and fatty acids.

Some cheeses have additional bacteria or molds intentionally introduced before or during aging. In traditional cheesemaking, these microbes might be already present in the aging room; they are allowed to settle and grow on the stored cheeses. More often today, prepared cultures are used, giving more consistent results and putting fewer constraints on the environment where the cheese ages. These cheeses include soft ripened cheeses such as Brie and Camembert; blue cheeses such as Roquefort, Stilton, Gorgonzola; and rind-washed cheeses such as Limburger.

== Types ==
There are many types of cheese, with around 500 different varieties recognized by the International Dairy Federation, more than 400 identified by Walter and Hargrove, more than 500 by Burkhalter, and more than 1,000 by Sandine and Elliker. The varieties may be grouped or classified into types according to criteria such as length of ageing, texture, methods of making, fat content, animal milk, country or region of origin, etc.—with these criteria either being used singly or in combination, but with no single method being universally used.

The method most commonly and traditionally used is based on moisture content, which is then further discriminated by fat content and curing or ripening methods. Some attempts have been made to rationalise the classification of cheese—a scheme was proposed by Pieter Walstra which uses the primary and secondary starter combined with moisture content, and Walter and Hargrove suggested classifying by production methods which produces 18 types, which are then further grouped by moisture content.

The British Cheese Board once claimed that Britain had about 700 distinct local cheeses. France and Italy have perhaps 400 each; a French proverb says there is a different French cheese for every day of the year; and Charles de Gaulle once asked "how can you govern a country in which there are 246 kinds of cheese?".

== Cooking and eating ==
Saganaki, lit on fire, served in Chicago

At refrigerator temperatures, the fat in a piece of cheese is as hard as unsoftened butter, and its protein structure is stiff as well. Flavor and odor compounds are less easily liberated when cold. For improvements in flavor and texture, it is widely advised that cheeses warm up to room temperature before eating. If the cheese is further warmed, to 26–32 °C (79–90 °F), the fats begin to "sweat out" as they go beyond soft to fully liquid.

Above room temperatures, most hard cheeses melt. Rennet-curdled cheeses have a gel-like protein matrix that is broken down by heat. When enough protein bonds are broken, the cheese itself turns from a solid to a viscous liquid. Soft, high-moisture cheeses melt at around 55 °C (131 °F), while hard, low-moisture cheeses such as Parmesan remain solid until they reach about 82 °C (180 °F). Acid-set cheeses, including halloumi, paneer, some whey cheeses and many varieties of fresh goat cheese, have a protein structure that remains intact at high temperatures. When cooked, these cheeses just get firmer as water evaporates.

Some cheeses, like raclette, melt smoothly; many tend to become stringy or suffer from a separation of their fats. Many of these can be coaxed into melting smoothly in the presence of acids or starch. Fondue, with wine providing the acidity, is a good example of a smoothly melted cheese dish. Elastic stringiness is a quality that is sometimes enjoyed, in dishes including pizza and Welsh rarebit. Even a melted cheese eventually turns solid again, after enough moisture is cooked off. The saying "you can't melt cheese twice" (meaning "some things can only be done once") refers to the fact that oils leach out during the first melting and are gone, leaving the non-meltable solids behind.

As its temperature continues to rise, cheese browns and eventually burns. Browned, partially burned cheese has a distinct flavor of its own and is frequently used in cooking (e.g., sprinkling atop items before baking them).

=== Cheeseboard ===
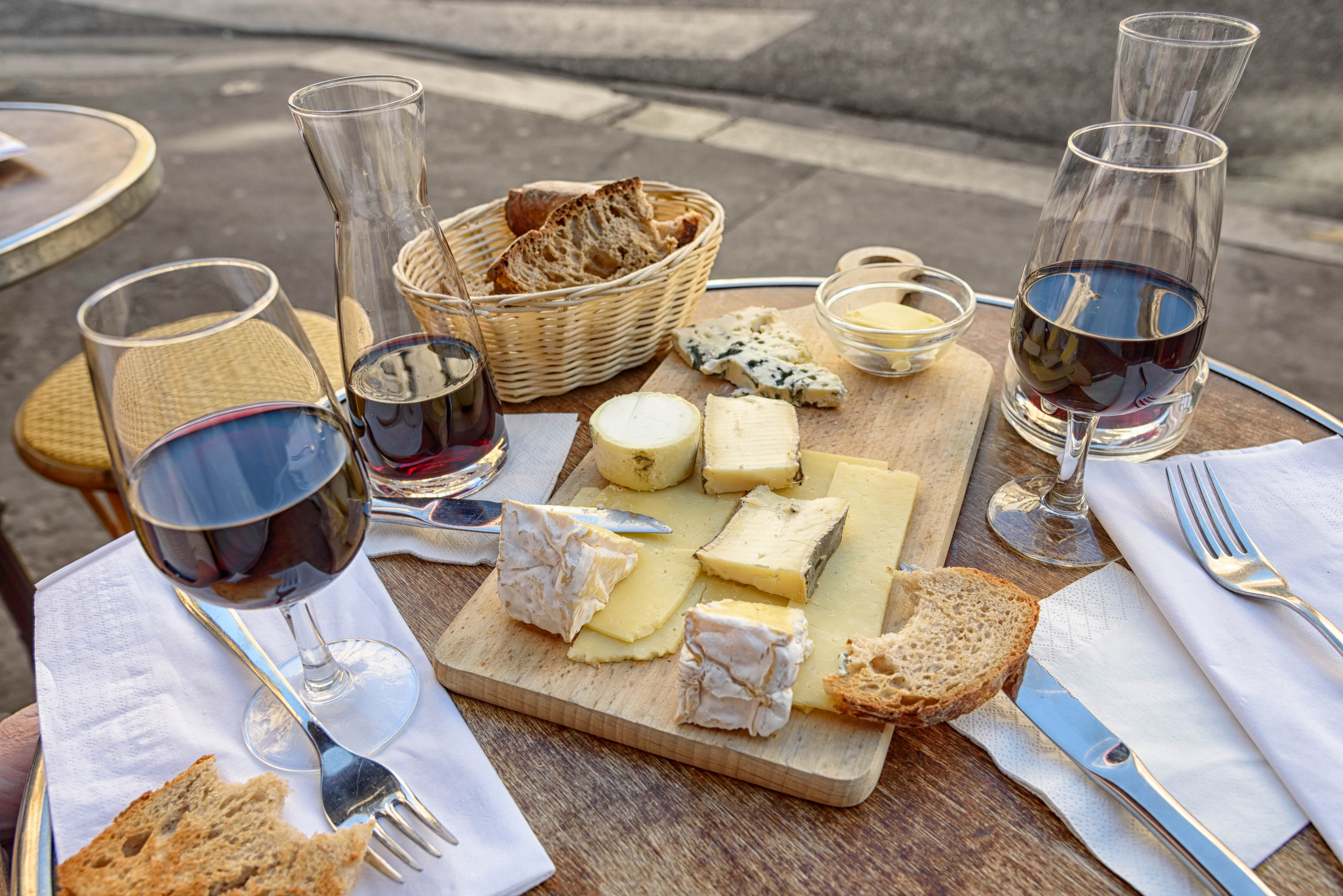
Cheeseboard, bread, and wine on a cafe table

A cheeseboard (or cheese course) may be served at the end of a meal before or following dessert, or replacing the last course. The British tradition is to have cheese after dessert, accompanied by sweet wines like port. In France, cheese is consumed before dessert, with robust red wine. A cheeseboard typically has contrasting cheeses with accompaniments, such as crackers, biscuits, grapes, nuts, celery or chutney.

A cheeseboard typically contains four to six cheeses, for example: mature Cheddar or Comté (hard: cow's milk cheeses); Brie or Camembert (soft: cow's milk); a blue cheese such as Stilton (hard: cow's milk), Roquefort (medium: ewe's milk) or Bleu d'Auvergne (medium-soft cow's milk); and a soft/medium-soft goat's cheese (e.g. Sainte-Maure de Touraine, Pantysgawn, Crottin de Chavignol).

A cheeseboard 70 feet (21 m) long was used to feature the variety of cheeses manufactured in Wisconsin, where the state legislature recognizes a "cheesehead" hat as a state symbol.

== Nutrition and health ==
=== Nutritional value ===
The nutritional value of cheese varies widely. Low-fat cottage cheese is 2% fat and 11% protein while dry queso seco cheese is 24% fat and 25% protein, and full-fat cream cheese is 34% fat and 6% protein. In general, cheese is a rich source (20% or more of the Daily Value, DV) of calcium, protein, phosphorus, sodium and saturated fat. A 17-gram (one slice) serving of cheddar cheese contains about 4 grams (0.14 oz) of protein and 120 milligrams of calcium.

Macronutrients in common cheeses per 100 g
	Water	Protein	Fat	Carbs
Swiss	37.1	26.9	27.8	5.4
Feta	55.2	14.2	21.3	4.1
Cheddar	36.8	24.9	33.1	1.3
Mozzarella	50	22.2	22.4	2.2
Cottage	80	11.1	4.3	3.4

Abbreviations:
- Ch: Choline
- Ca: Calcium
- Fe: Iron
- Mg: Magnesium
- P: Phosphorus
- K: Potassium
- Na: Sodium
- Zn: Zinc
- Cu: Copper
- Mn: Manganese
- Se: Selenium.

Vitamin content of common cheeses, % DV per 100 g
	A	B1	B2	B3	B5	B6	B9	B12	C	D	E	K
Swiss	17	4	17	0	4	4	1	56	0	11	2	3
Feta	8	10	50	5	10	21	8	28	0	0	1	2
Cheddar	20	2	22	0	4	4	5	14	0	3	1	3
Mozzarella	14	2	17	1	1	2	2	38	0	0	1	3
Cottage	3	2	10	0	6	2	3	7	0	0	0	0

Mineral content of common cheeses, % DV per 100 g
	Ch	Ca	Fe	Mg	P	K	Na	Zn	Cu	Mn	Se
Swiss	2.8	79	10	1	57	2	8	29	2	0	26
Feta	2.2	49	4	5	34	2	46	19	2	1	21
Cheddar	3	72	4	7	51	3	26	21	2	1	20
Mozzarella	2.8	51	2	5	35	2	26	19	1	1	24
Cottage	3.3	8	0	2	16	3	15	3	1	0	14

=== Cardiovascular disease ===
National health organizations, such as the American Heart Association, Association of UK Dietitians, British National Health Service, and Mayo Clinic, among others, recommend that cheese consumption be minimized, replaced in snacks and meals by plant foods, or restricted to low-fat cheeses to reduce caloric intake and blood levels of LDL fat, which is a risk factor for cardiovascular diseases.

=== Pasteurization ===
A number of food safety agencies around the world have warned of the risks of raw-milk cheeses. The U.S. Food and Drug Administration states that soft raw-milk cheeses can cause "serious infectious diseases including listeriosis, brucellosis, salmonellosis and tuberculosis". It is U.S. law since 1944 that all raw-milk cheeses (including imports since 1951) must be aged at least 60 days. Australia has a wide ban on raw-milk cheeses as well, though in recent years exceptions have been made for Swiss Gruyère, Emmental and Sbrinz, and for French Roquefort. There is a trend for cheeses to be pasteurized even when not required by law.

Pregnant women may face an additional risk from cheese: the U.S. Centers for Disease Control has warned pregnant women against eating soft-ripened cheeses and blue-veined cheeses, due to the listeria risk, which can cause miscarriage or harm the fetus.

== Cultural attitudes ==
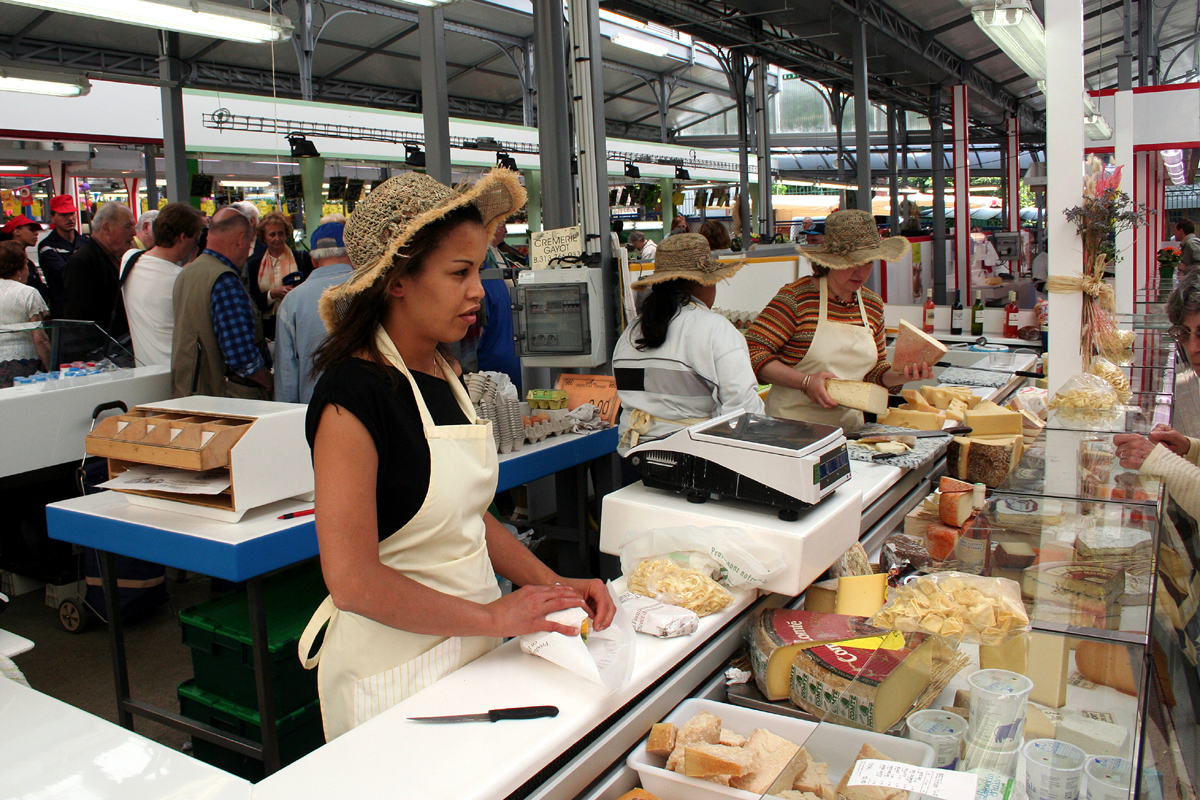
A cheese merchant in a French market

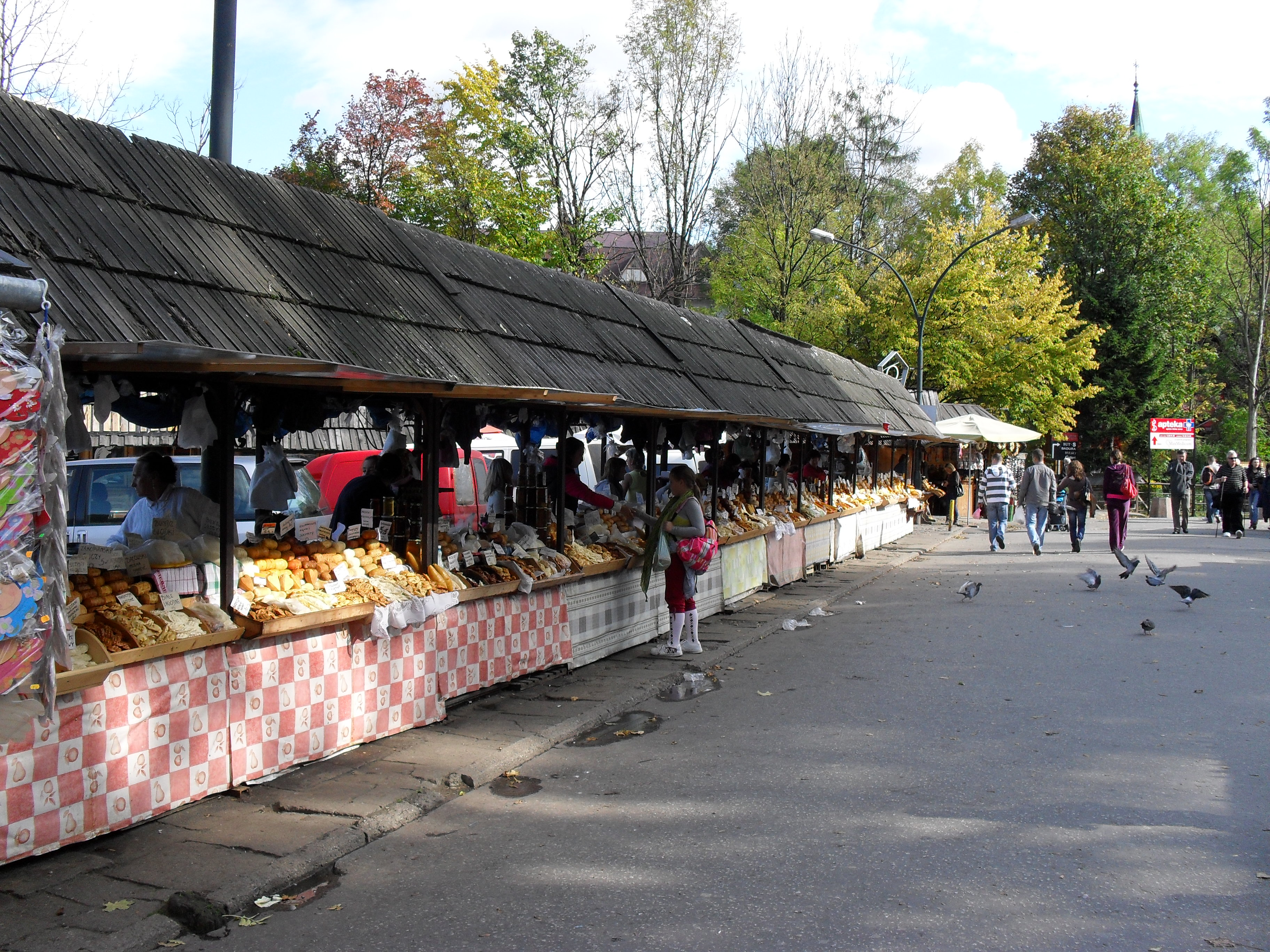
A traditional Polish sheep's cheese market in Zakopane, Poland

Among the few cheeses in Southeast and East Asian cuisines is paneer, a fresh acid-set cheese. In Nepal, the Dairy Development Corporation commercially manufactures cheese made from yak milk and a hard cheese made from either cow or yak milk known as chhurpi. Bhutan produces a similar cheese called Datshi, which is a staple in most Bhutanese curries. The national dish of Bhutan, ema datshi, is made from homemade yak or mare milk cheese and hot peppers. In Yunnan, China, several ethnic minority groups produce Rushan and Rubing from cow's milk. Cheese consumption may be increasing in China, with annual sales doubling from 1996 to 2003 (to a still small 30 million U.S. dollars a year).

Strict followers of the dietary laws of Islam and Judaism must avoid cheeses made with rennet from animals not slaughtered in accordance with halal or kosher laws respectively.

Rennet derived from animal slaughter, and thus cheese made with animal-derived rennet is not vegetarian. Most widely available vegetarian cheeses are made using rennet produced by fermentation of the fungus Mucor miehei. Vegans and other dairy-avoiding people do not eat dairy cheese, but some vegan cheeses (soy or almond) are used as substitutes.

=== Odorous cheeses ===
Even in cultures with long cheese traditions, consumers may perceive some cheeses that are especially pungent-smelling, or mold-bearing varieties such as Limburger, Stilton or Roquefort, as unpalatable. Such cheeses are an acquired taste because they are processed using molds or microbiological cultures, allowing odor and flavor molecules to resemble those in rotten foods. McGee writes, "An aversion to the odor of decay has the obvious biological value of steering us away from possible food poisoning, so it is no wonder that an animal food that gives off whiffs of shoes and soil and the stable takes some getting used to." He notes that "the 17th century saw the publication of at least two learned treatises (by Martin Shook, a Dutchman, and Thomas Sagittarius, a German), 'de aversatione casei,' or 'on the aversion to cheese."

=== Effect on sleep ===
There is some support from studies that dairy products can help with insomnia. Scientists have debated how cheese might affect sleep. A folk belief that cheese eaten close to bedtime can cause nightmares may have arisen from the Charles Dickens novella A Christmas Carol, in which Ebenezer Scrooge attributes his visions of Jacob Marley to the cheese he ate. This belief can be found in folklore that predates this story. The theory has been disproven multiple times, although night cheese may cause vivid dreams or otherwise disrupt sleep due to its high saturated fat content, according to studies by the British Cheese Board. Other studies indicate it may actually make people dream less.

== See also ==
- Dairy industry
- Dutch cheese markets
- List of cheese dishes
- List of cheeses
- List of dairy products
- List of microorganisms used in food and beverage preparation
- Sheep milk cheese
