= Ema datshi =

Cheese and chili-based dish from Bhutan

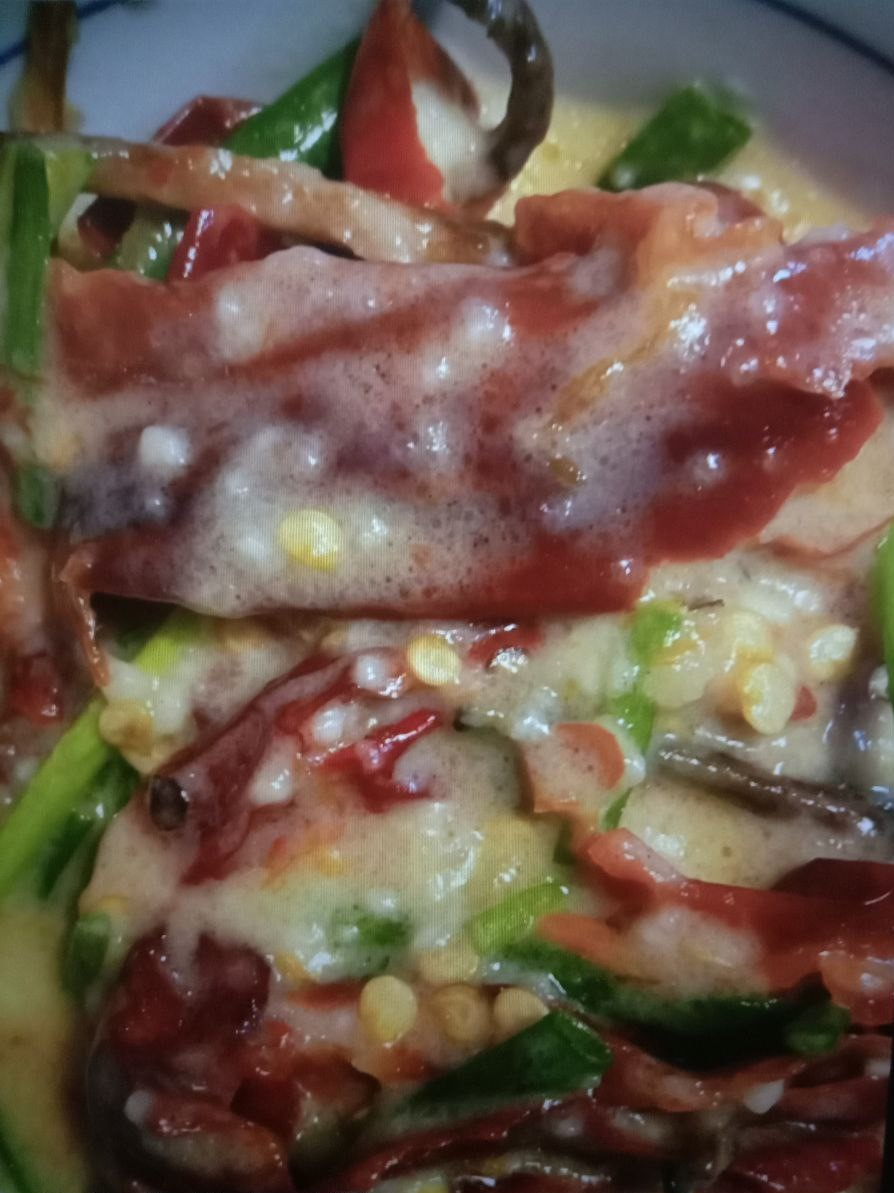
Ema datshi (dry red chilli version)

Ema datshi (Dzongkha: ཨེ་མ་དར་ཚིལ་; Wylie: e-ma dar-tshil) is a spicy Bhutanese stew made from hot chili peppers and cheese. It is among the most famous dishes in Bhutanese cuisine, recognized as the national dish of the country. Over the years, ema datshi, which has its roots in Tibetan culinary traditions, has undergone various changes to suit the preference of local Bhutanese taste.

Different varieties of chilies may be used: green chili, red chili, or white chili (green chili washed in hot water and sun-dried), which may be dried or fresh. The chilies are called "sha ema" which is a Capsicum annuum cultivar, a form of pepper much like cayenne, poblano, ancho, or Anaheim. Beyond the classic ema datshi, numerous variations exist, depending on the type of vegetable used.

The cheese used in ema datshi is called datshi; it is usually made at home from the curd of cow's or yak's milk. While rich in flavor, ema datshi is high in fats and sodium, making it less suitable for individuals with certain health conditions.

== Etymology ==
The term "Ema datshi" originates from Dzongkha, the official language of Bhutan. Ema datshi is written as "ཨེ་མ་དར་ཚིལ་" in Dzongkha. In the wylie transliteration system, "Ema datshi" is represented as "e-ma dar-tshil". In Dzongkha, "ema" translates to "chili" and "datshi" means "cheese." Therefore, "ema datshi" directly translates to "chili cheese" in English. "Ema" is pronounced similar to "ay-ma," with the emphasis on the first syllable. "Datshi" is pronounced as "da-chee," with a soft "ch" sound and emphasis on the second syllable.

== History ==
Prior to the arrival of chilies in the country, Bhutanese people used a plant called “namda” for seasoning. Chilli was possibly brought to the country by Indian pilgrims in the later years.

== Varieties ==
of the ema datshi, where potatoes replace chili peppers as the main ingredient. Semchung datshi is another vegetarian version of ema datshi where beans replace chili peppers as the main ingredients. Shamu datshi is a milder version of ema datshi, where mushrooms replace chili peppers as the main ingredient. Shakam datshi is the meat version of ema datshi that use beef as the main ingredient. Sikam datshi is another meat variation of ema datshi that uses pork as the main ingredient.

== Gallery ==
Varieties of Datshi

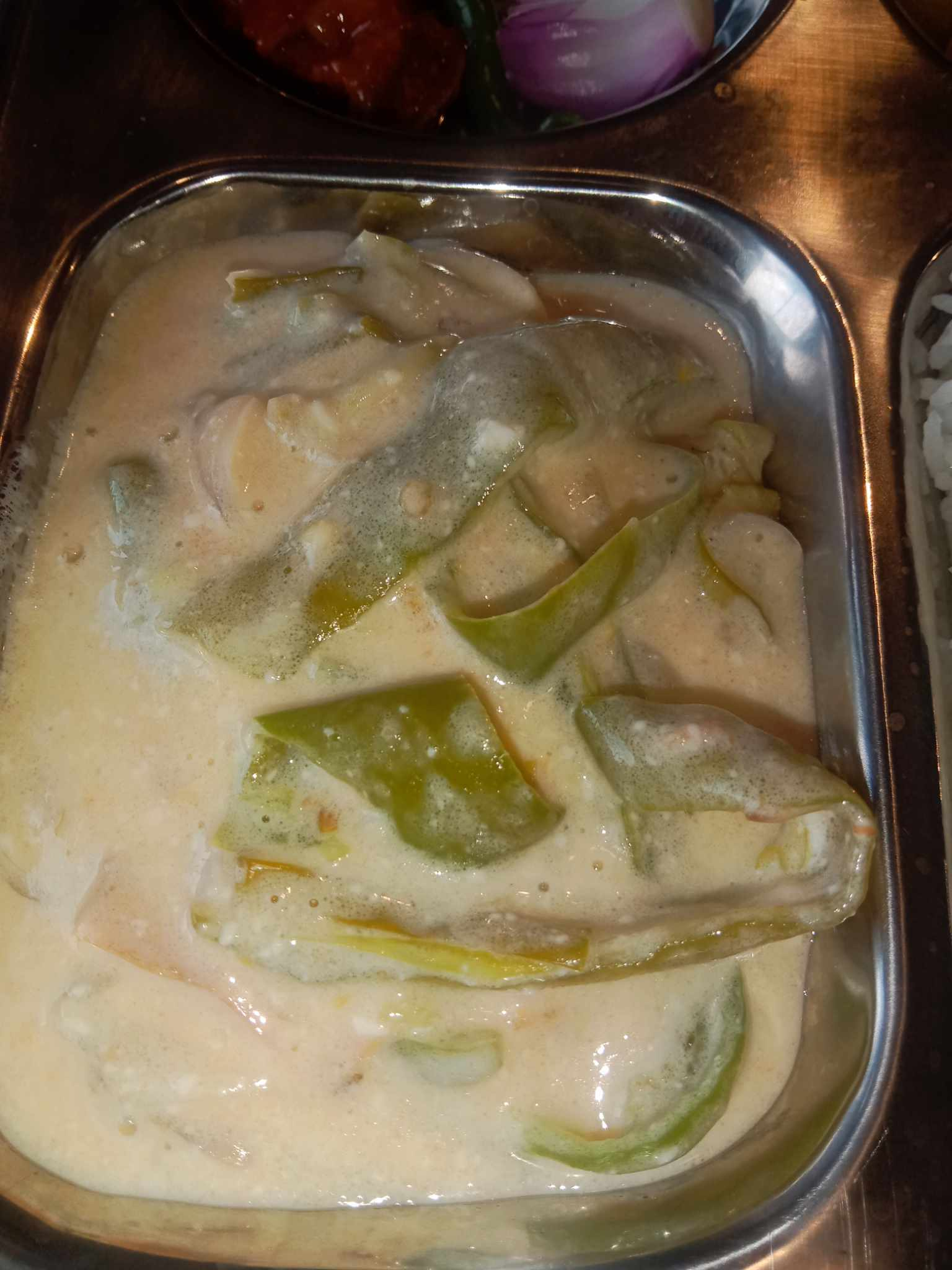
Ema datshi (green chilli version)

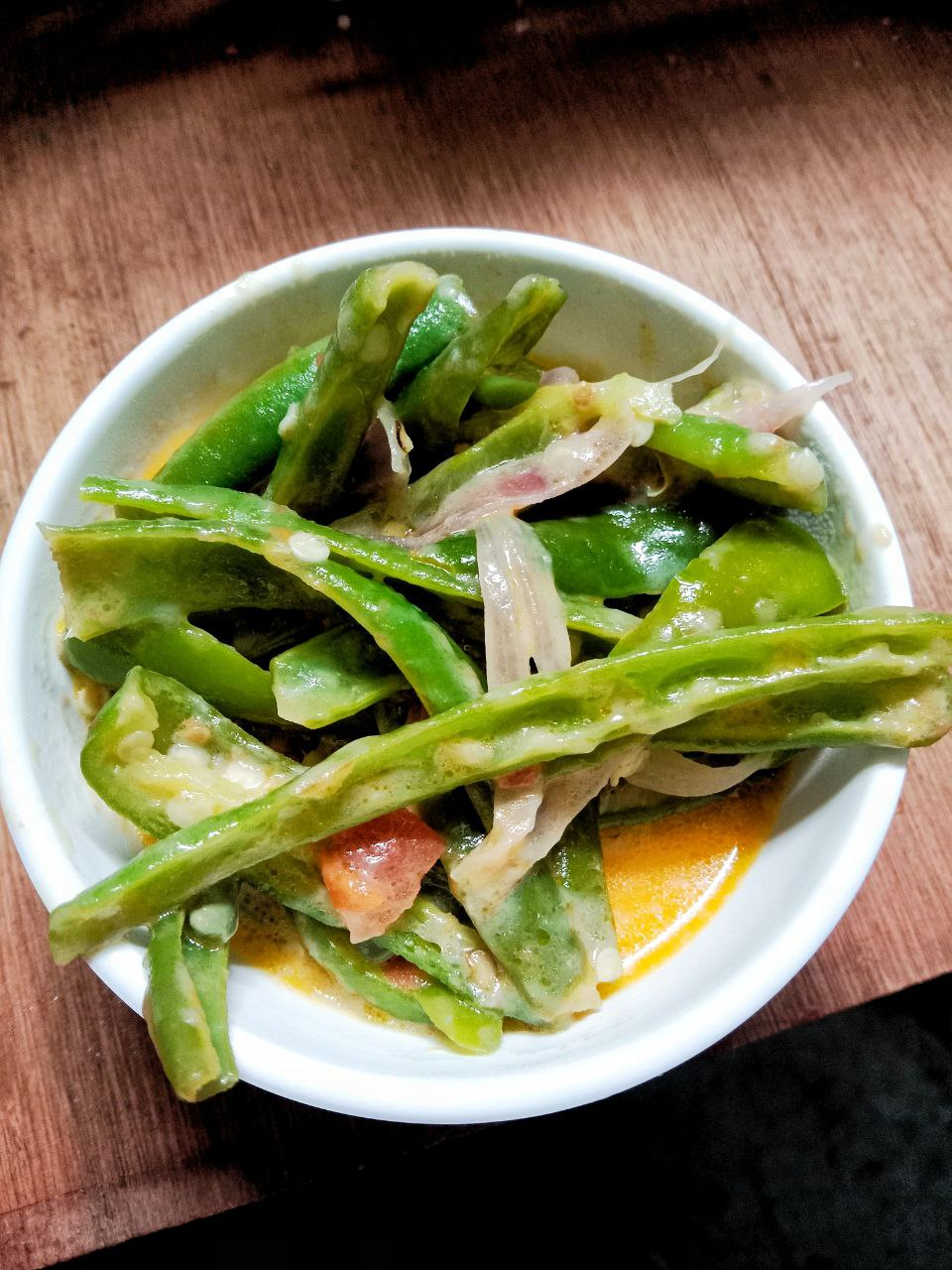
Semchung Datshi (Beans version)

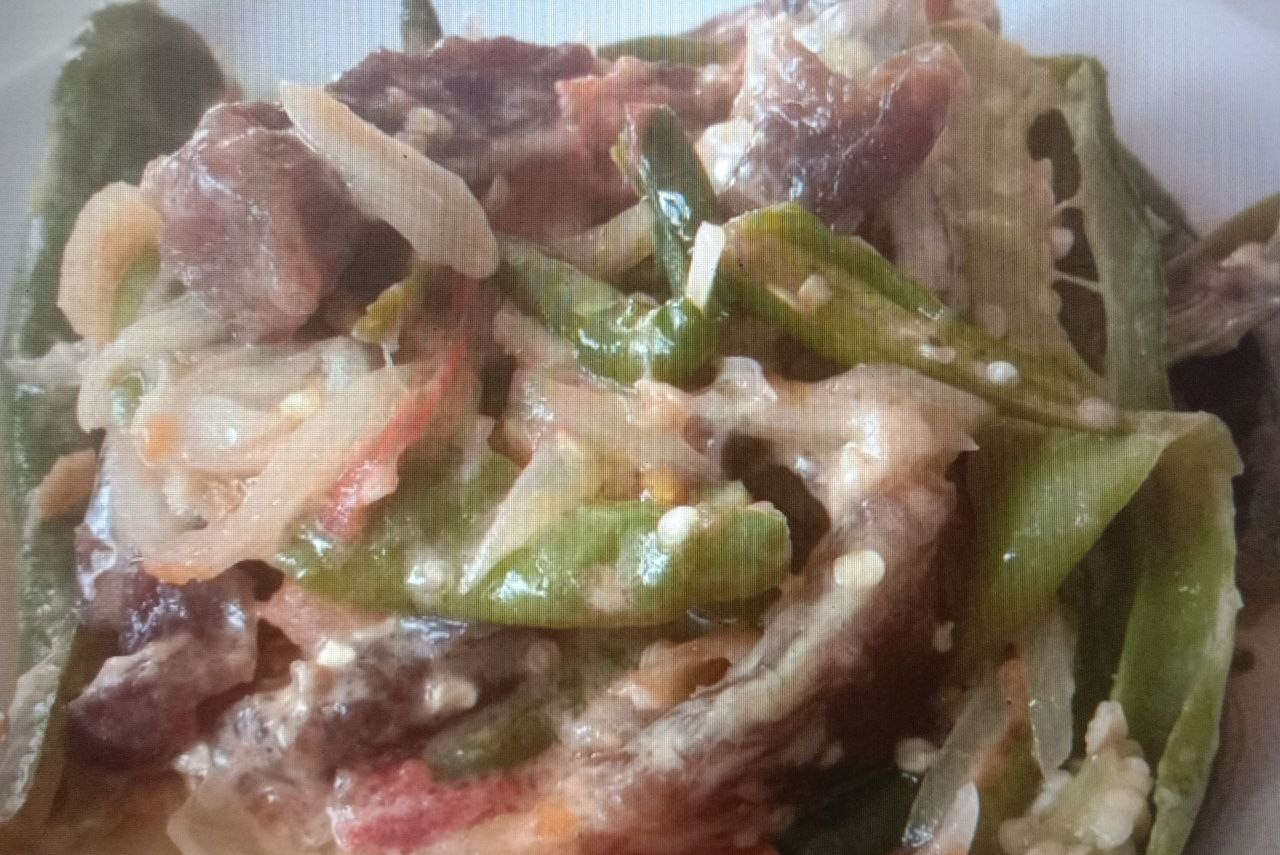
Shakam Datshi (Dried beef version)

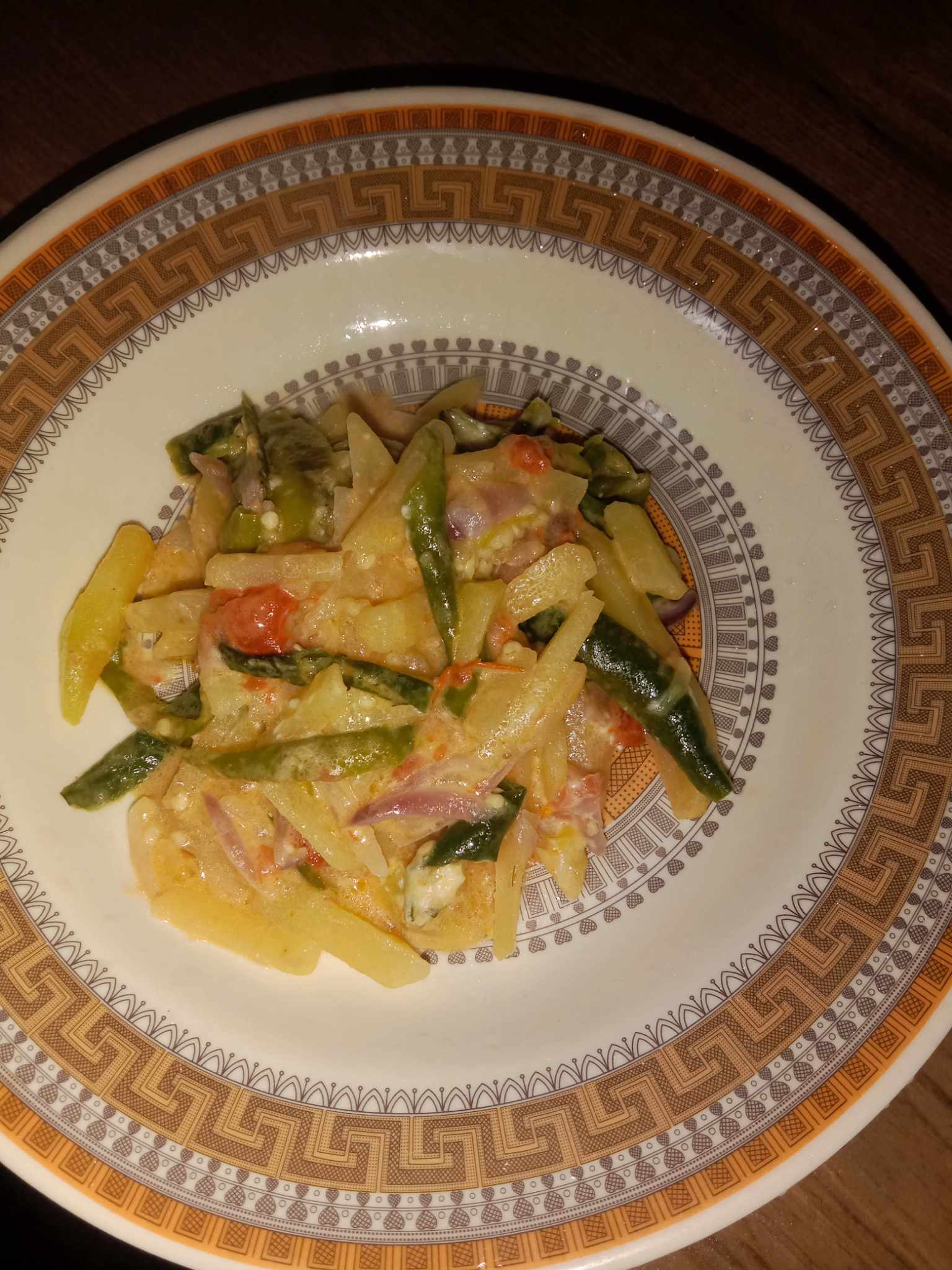
Kewa Datshi (Potato version)

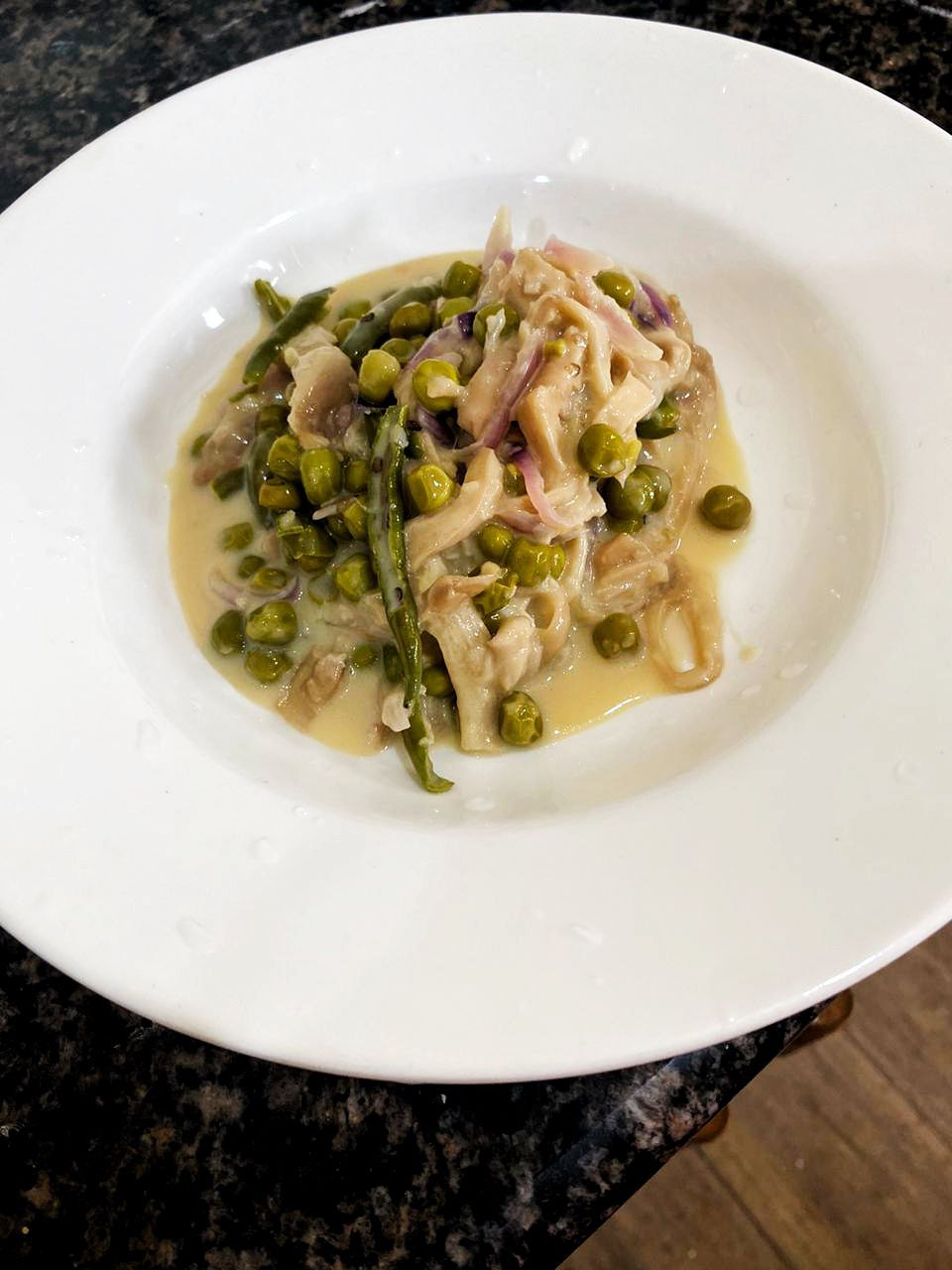
Shamu Datshi (Mushroom version)

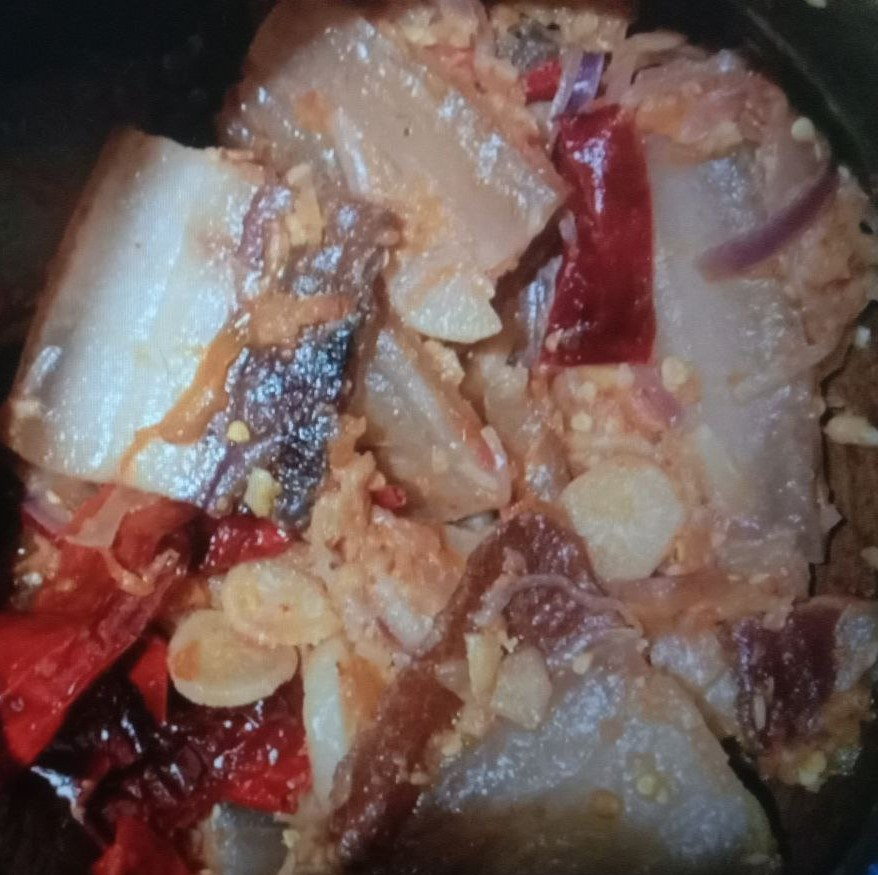
Sikam datshi (Pork version)

== Ingredients ==
The ingredients used in ema datshi are chilies, spring onions, farm cheese, vegetable oil and salt. In kewa datshi the ingredients used are potatoes and datshi (Bhutanese cheese). The potatoes are first boiled and then added to the dish after. In shamu datshi the main ingredients are mushroom and datshi. Varieties of mushrooms can be used depending on availability and preference. Local wild mushrooms are preferred to have a more genuine flavour. In shakam datshi the main ingredients are shakam (dried beef) and datshi whereas in sikam datshi the main ingredients are sikam (pork) and datshi with lots of chillies.

== Serving ==
Ema datshi is often served as a main course, accompanied by red rice and other Bhutanese dishes like phaksha paa (dried pork with red chilies) or jasha maroo (spicy chicken curry). Kewa datshi is typically served as a side dish to complement other Bhutanese main courses. It is also part of the staple diet in Bhutanese cuisine. Shamu datshi is usually served as a main course, accompanied by red rice or other traditional Bhutanese grains. It may be paired with side dishes like khur-le (buckwheat pancakes) or Bhutanese salad. Shakam ema datshi is often served as a main course, accompanied by traditional Bhutanese staples like red rice. It can also be complemented with side dishes such as buckwheat pancakes (khur-le) or Bhutanese salads. Siakm datshi (dried pork curry) is usually served as a main course, accompanied by traditional Bhutanese staples like red rice. It may be served with side dishes such as buckwheat pancakes (khur-le) or Bhutanese salad.

== Health and nutritional facts ==
Serving size – 1 bowl (300 g)

Calories – 275 cal, Fat – 18 g, Saturated fat – 11.3 g, Sodium – 850 mg, Total carbohydrates – 14 g, Sugars – 8 g, Protein – 14 g

Ema datshi is extremely high in fats, especially saturated fats and is also rich in sodium making the dish unsuitable for people suffering with cardiovascular diseases and hypertension. The dish also increases the chance of blockages in heart. Additionally people who are obese should avoid this dish. A healthier variant can be made using less cheese or low fat feta which not only reduce the fat but also reduce its calorific value. The Chilli used in this dish has numerous health benefits such as helping to regulate blood sugar levels and also help boost circulation and clear any kind of congestion. Hypertensive patients should use low salt feta as this kind of cheese is a very good source of calcium and is beneficial for women because it is a good source of protein for children, old people and body builders.
