= Hoentay =

Bhutanese sweet buckwheat dumpling

- Type: Dumpling
- Place of origin: Bhutan

Hoentay is a traditional sweet buckwheat dumpling that is known have originated from Haa Valley in Bhutan. Similar to momos they are made from buckwheat dough wrapper usually combined with spinach or turnip leaves, amaranth seeds (zimtse), cottage cheese, butter, chili powder, onion and ginger. It is usually eaten during the festival of Lomba, an agricultural festival that marks the end of the harvest season and for New Year celebrations.

However, with urbanisation, Hoentey is losing its place among the younger generation.

== See also ==
- Bhutanese cuisine
