= Chhurpi =

East and South Asian cheese

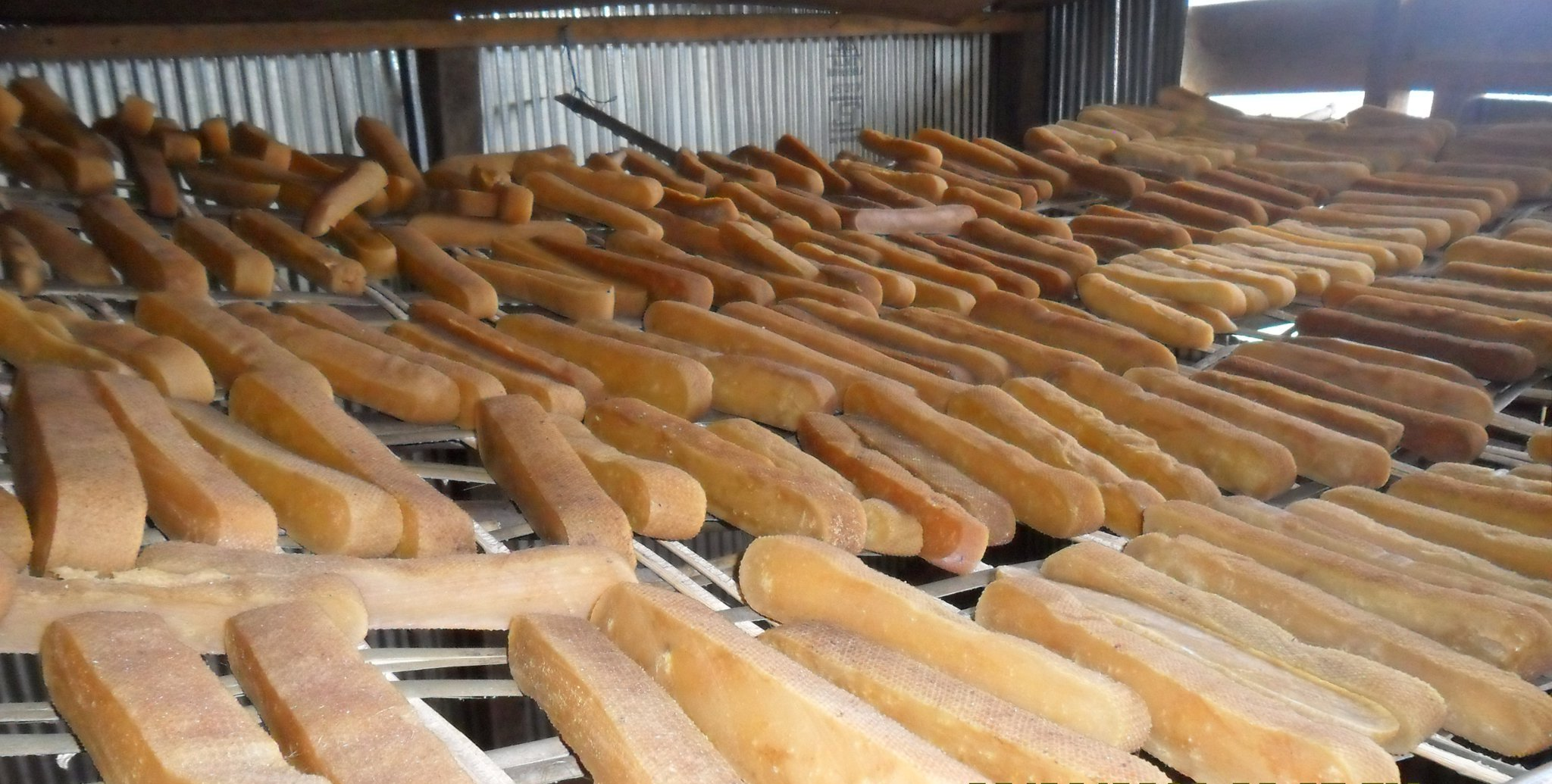
- Production of Chhurpi in Nepal
- Other names: Durkha
- Country of origin: Nepal
- Region: Himalayas
- Source of milk: Yak, Cattle
- Texture: Soft or hard
- Aging time: Few weeks upto 20 years or more

Chhurpi (Nepali: छुर्पी, Tibetan: ཆུར་བ།, THL: churwa), otherwise known as durkha and chogo/chugo, is a traditional cheese consumed in Nepal, Bhutan, Tibet and parts of Northeastern India. Originated in the high Himalayas of Nepal and China it is mostly found in two varieties soft variety (for daily consumption) and a hard variety (for animals as a treat). Chhurpi is considered one of the hardest cheeses in the world.

== Preparation ==
Chhurpi is prepared in a local dairy or at home from buttermilk. The buttermilk is boiled and the solid mass that is obtained is separated from the liquid and wrapped and hung in a thin cloth to drain out the water. The product is rather like the Italian ricotta, which also is made from whey. It is soft, white, and neutral in taste. However, it is often left to ferment a bit to acquire a tangy taste.

To prepare the hard variety, the soft chhurpi is wrapped in a jute bag and pressed hard to get rid of the water. After it dries, it is cut into small cuboidal pieces and hung over fire to harden it further.

== Consumption ==
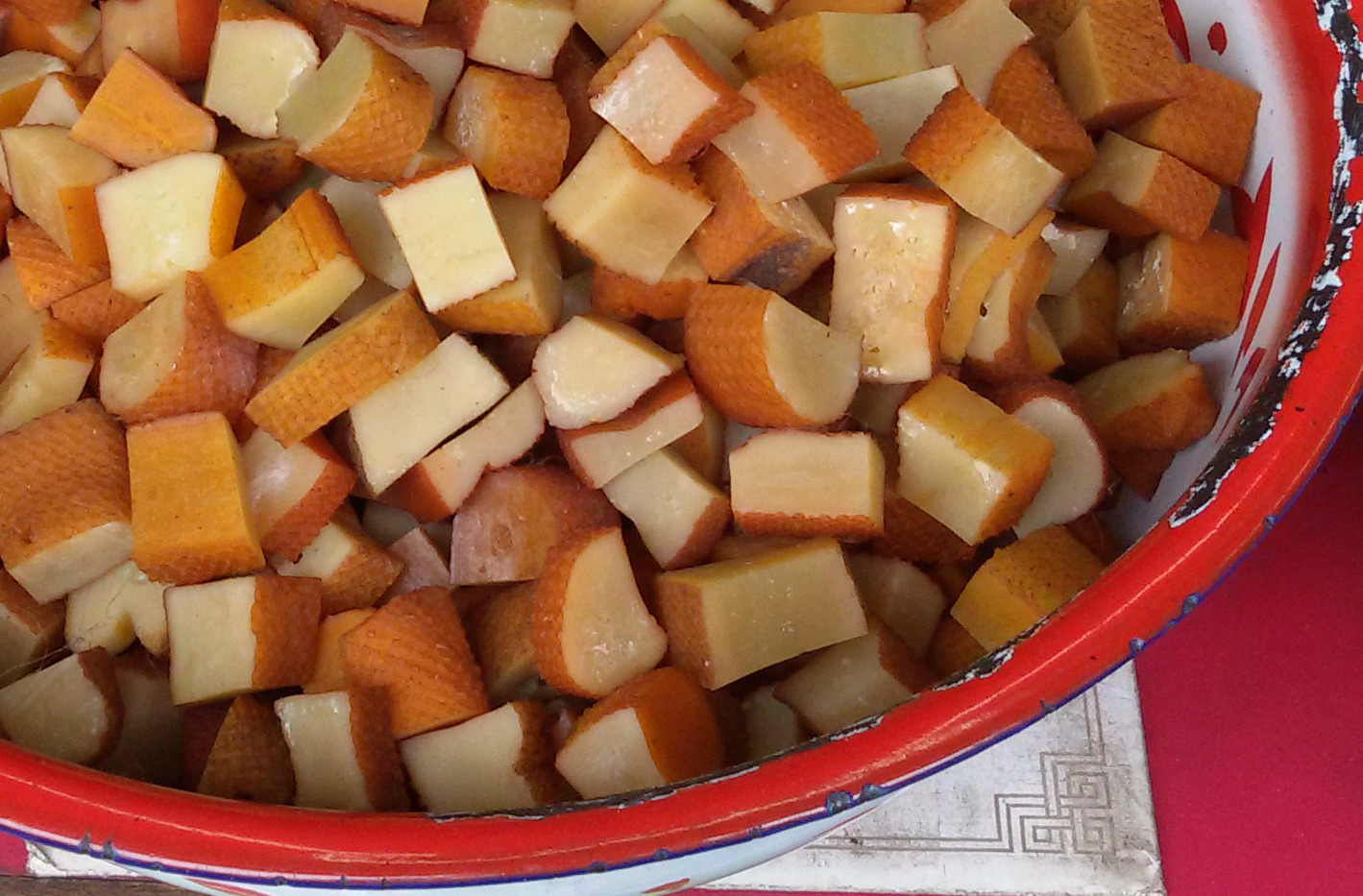
Hard Chhurpi

Soft chhurpi is consumed in a variety of ways, including cooking with green vegetables as savoury dishes, as a filling for momo, grinding with tomatoes and chillies for senpen (chutney) and as a soup. In the mountainous regions of the Himalayas, chhurpi is consumed as a substitute for vegetables because it is an excellent source of protein.

Hard chhurpi is usually consumed by keeping it in the mouth to moisten it, letting parts of it become soft, and then chewing it like a gum. In this manner, one block of chhurpi can last anywhere from 30 minutes to up to five hours.

=== Use as dog treats ===
The production of chhurpi dog treats is a growing industry, with exports from Nepal worth Rs. 4 billion in 2025 (about US$27 million).

== See also ==
- List of cheeses
