= Nindar =

- Village
- Nickname: Nindhar
- Location in Rajasthan, India Nindar (Rajasthan) Nindar (India)
- Coordinates: 27.020787°N 75.764668°E
- Country: India
- State: Rajasthan
- District: Jaipur

Government
  - Body: Jaipur Municipal Corporation

Languages
  - Official: Hindi
- Time zone: UTC+5:30 (IST)
- PIN: 302013
- Telephone code: 0141
- ISO 3166 code: RJ-IN
- Nearest city: Jaipur
- Vidhan Sabha constituency: Vidyadhar Nagar
- Civic agency: Jaipur Municipal Corporation

Nindar (or Nindhar,) is a village in Jaipur District, in the Indian state of Rajasthan.

== Geography ==
It is situated about 10 km west of Amer in a direct line, but separated from Amber by hills and forests. It fell closer to Jaipur after Maharaja Sawai Jai Singh founded his new capital as Jaipur in 1727 CE. It is 2 km from NH 11 (Bikaner to Agra via Jaipur). The village was included in Jaipur Municipal Corporation prior to 1995. The village is within sight of the Aravalli Range.

== Culture ==
The village hosts a fort and a palace that are visible from National highway No. 08.

== History ==
The village was granted under a jagir to Rao "Shivbramh" or "Sheobramh", the fourth son of Raja Udaikaran of Amber (1366–1388). The descendants of Rao Sheobramh are known as Sheobramhpota.

Raja Prithviraj of Amber included the Sheobramhpota in the twelve principal houses of Amber called the Bara Kothri. A Tazimi thikana, it is notable that only three out of the twelve principal houses came from predecessors of Prithviraj.

Nindar was founded by Rao Shivbramh, the fourth son of Raja Udaikaranaji of Amber (Jaipur) 1366/1388. Shivbramh received villages, including Nindar, as his inheritance. Thereafter sons and grandsons of Shivbramha ruled Nindar until 1956 when the resumption of the Jagirs Act was passed.
