= Datshi =

Bhutanese cottage cheese

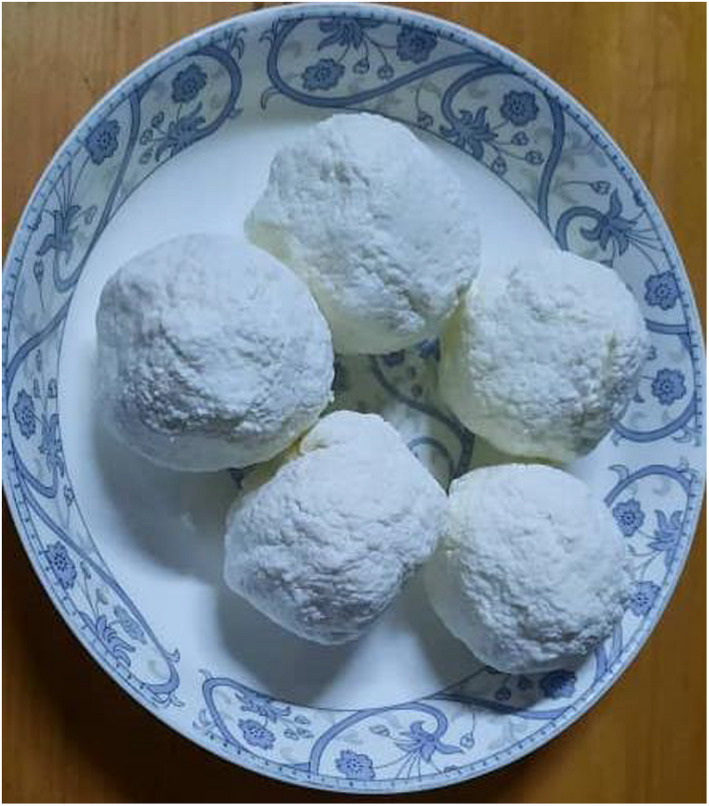
- Place of origin: Bhutan
- Main ingredients: Milk

Datshi (Dzongkha:དར་ཚི;Wylie: dar-tshi) is a traditional Bhutanese cottage cheese commonly produced from cow milk. It is a naturally fermented milk product produced using the back-slopping method. To make Datshi, Dahi is first prepared from raw milk, the Dahi is then processed into Mar (artisanal butter) by churning in a special wooden container called Theki. The Mar is collected and the liquid residue, called Mohi, is gently heated. The heating causes casein to coagulate and the Mohi starts forming clumps. The Datshi is collected in a cloth and squeezed to eliminate extra whey and then rolled into appropriate sized cheese balls.

Datshi is widely produced and consumed on a daily basis in Bhutan. It is a Bhutanese staple and is often used as a key ingredient in most Bhutanese curries. For example: the famous Bhutanese cuisine Ema datshi uses Datshi as the cheese and hence the name. It is also used in various other dishes such as Kewa Datshi and Shakam Datshi. In 2018, 74% of produced milk was utilized in the production of dairy products. The main dairy products produced were Mar, Datshi and Chugo, with Datshi being the most produced followed by Mar and Chugo. Bhutan currently does not export Datshi since the local demand outweighs supply.

Matured Datshi, known as Zoetay (Dzongkha: ཟེ་ཏོད, Wylie:ze-te), is also widely consumed in Bhutan. It is made from storing fresh Datshi in loosely covered containers/plastic or tree leave wraps at room temperature. The Datshi develops a pungent odour and a slimy, gelatinous exterior layer which is the Zoetay.
