= Wardour Street English =

Style of speech in English

Wardour Street English is the description given to a pseudo-archaic form of diction affected by some writers in English, particularly those of historical fiction. The term alludes to the former reputation of Wardour Street in the Soho district of London as a centre for dealers in antique and reproduction furniture, and their supposed propensity for passing off modern imitations as original items.

The phrase was coined by the historian Archibald Ballantyne in an article entitled Wardour Street English, published in Longman's Magazine in 1888, in which he characterised William Morris's translation of the Odyssey as “not literary English of any date; this is Wardour-Street Early English—a perfectly modern article with a sham appearance of the real antique about it.” The phrase appeared sporadically thereafter in literary criticism, particularly in reference to Morris's work, and there is a brief mention of "antiquarian rubbish, Wardour Street English" in The King's English, by the brothers H.W. Fowler and F.G. Fowler, but it was the article Wardour Street in A Dictionary of Modern English Usage, written by H.W. Fowler after his brother's death, that gave the expression broad currency, and led to it often being misattributed to him. Fowler wrote:

As Wardour Street itself offers to those who live in modern houses the opportunity of picking up an antique or two that will be conspicuous for good or ill among their surroundings, so this article offers to those who write modern English a selection of oddments calculated to establish (in the eyes of some readers) their claim to be persons of taste & writers of beautiful English.

Words deprecated by Fowler included anent, aught, ere, erstwhile, haply, maugre, oft, perchance, thither, to wit, varlet, withal, and wot. Some words that Fowler found objectionable became part of normal English idiom, including albeit, forebears, and proven.

Wardour Street English includes not only an incongruous choice of vocabulary, but also pseudo-archaic sentence structure. Fowler criticised the use of inverted protasis with had, should and were (as in "Had he done this, then…, rather than "If he had done this, then…"), although this objection does not appear in later editions of his work. A more recent edition gives as examples "Bread and wine needs a man to fight and die" and "Us enchants he, but eke frightens."

Modern critics are more likely to take issue with the incongruous use of modern vernacular in popular broadcast period dramas than pseudo-archaic language.

== See also ==
- Archaism

== Citations ==
- Anonymous (8 February 1890). "Mr. William Morris's Story". The Spectator. Vol. lxv. pp. 208–209. (book review)
- Ball, A.H.R. (1931). Selections from the Prose Works of William Morris. Cambridge: Cambridge University Press.
- Ballantyne, Archibald (1888). "Wardour Street English". Longman's Magazine. No. 12 (Oct). pp. 585–594.
- Burchfield, Robert, ed. (2004). Fowler's Dictionary of Modern English Usage (Revised 3rd ed.). Oxford: Oxford University Press. ISBN 978-0-19-869126-6. OCLC 36063311.
- Butterfield, Jeremy, ed. (2015). Fowler's Dictionary of Modern English Usage (4th ed.). Oxford: Oxford University Press. ISBN 978-0-19-966135-0.
- Collinson, W.E. (1927). Contemporary English: A Personal Speech Record. Leipzig: B. G. Teubner Verlag.
- Fowler, Henry Watson (1926). "Wardour Street". A Dictionary of Modern English Usage (1st ed.). Oxford: Clarendon Press. p. 700. OCLC 318492.
- Fowler, Henry Watson; Fowler, Francis George (1906). The King's English (2nd ed.). Oxford: Clarendon Press.
- Sainsbury, George (1912). A History of English Prose Rhythm. London: Macmillan and Company.
- "Wardour Street". Shorter Oxford English Dictionary (6th ed.). Oxford: Oxford University Press. 2007. p. 3575.
- Wordsworth, Dot (3 September 2011). "Little lists for word lovers". The Spectator.
