= Modern American Usage =

Modern American Usage may refer to:

- Follett's Modern American Usage, a 1966 usage guide for contemporary American English by Wilson Follett
- Garner's Modern American Usage, a 2009 usage guide for contemporary American English by Bryan Garner

== See also ==
- A Dictionary of Modern English Usage, a 1926 usage guide for contemporary British English by Henry Watson Fowler
- American English, a set of dialects of the English language used mostly in the United States
- Usage, the manner in which written and spoken language is used
