= While =

Noun and subordinating conjunction

While is a word in the English language that functions both as a noun and as a subordinating conjunction. Its meaning varies largely based on its intended function, position in the phrase and even the writer or speaker's regional dialect. As a conjunction, it is synonymous with the word whilst, a form often considered archaic in American English, as well as in some style guides on both sides of the Atlantic.

== Usage ==
=== Noun ===
A while and awhile are often confused due to the fact that while is often accompanied by the indefinite article. The main difference is that a while means "an amount of time" or "some duration" whereas awhile is an adverb meaning "for some amount of time" or "for some duration".

"I slept for a while before dinner."
"I slept awhile before dinner."

Both of these sentences yield the same effective meaning. Whilst is only a conjunction, and so its use here would be incorrect.

=== Conjunction ===
The primary function of the word as a conjunction is to indicate that two separate clauses occur at the same time.

"The days were hot while we were on vacation."
"I read a magazine while I was waiting."

While can also be legitimately used in the contrastive sense, comparable to the words "although" or "whereas", provided that it is not ambiguous (although some commentators, such as Eric Partridge, have disapproved of such use):

"While I like cats, my husband is allergic."
"While Sally plays, Sue works."

The latter sentence can mean either "during the time that Sally plays, Sue works" or "although Sally plays, Sue works" and is thus ambiguous.

Fowler's Modern English Usage disapproves of several uses of the conjunctive while. At times it is inappropriately used as a coordinating conjunction: "and" or "but" should be used instead. Its usage as "elegant variation" is also discouraged, as it is masquerading as a "formal word".

In some dialects of Northern England, while is translated into standard English as "until"; for example, "At least wait while we're done."

=== Usage ===
In standard British English and Australian English, whilst, as a conjunction, is synonymous with although, whereas, but or while. Unlike whilst, while is also used as a noun (as in "rest for a while") or a verb (as in "while away the hours").

The usage of whilst is chiefly British. For example, the BBC World Service website "Learning English", in their "Ask about English" section, uses the word whilst when explaining the usage of "while and whereas".

In American English, whilst is considered to be pretentious, archaic, and obsolete.

Some publications on both sides of the Atlantic disapprove of whilst in their style guides (along with other words ending in "st"; "amidst", "amongst", "unbeknownst", etc.); for example:

- BBC News: "while and not 'whilst'"
- Times Online Style Guide: "while (not whilst)"
- Guardian Style Guide: "while not whilst"
- Hansard: the Canadian Parliament record: "while not whilst"

The American Heritage Guide writes that, "while using whilst runs the risk of sounding pretentious, it can sometimes add a literary or ironically formal note to a piece of writing".

Practical English Usage by Michael Swan (OUP), a reference book for intermediate and advanced learners of English, does not include whilst but has several sections covering the usage of while.

== See also ==
- Linguistic prescription
- List of English words with disputed usage
