= Garner's Modern English Usage =

Usage dictionary and style guide by American writer Bryan A. Garner

- Author: Bryan A. Garner
- Language: English
- Subject: Style guide
- Publisher: Oxford University Press
- Publication date: 1998–2022
- Publication place: United States
- Media type: Print (hardcover)
- Pages: 1,312 (fifth edition)
- ISBN: 9780197599020

Garner's Modern English Usage (GMEU), written by Bryan A. Garner and published by Oxford University Press, is a usage dictionary and style guide (or "prescriptive dictionary") for contemporary Modern English. It was first published in 1998 as A Dictionary of Modern American Usage, with a focus on American English, which it retained for the next two editions as Garner's Modern American Usage (GMAU). It was expanded to cover English more broadly in the 2016 fourth edition, under the present title. The work covers issues of usage, pronunciation, and style, from distinctions among commonly confused words and phrases to notes on how to prevent verbosity and obscurity. In addition, it contains essays about the English language. An abridged version of the first edition was also published as The Oxford Dictionary of American Usage and Style in 2000.

== Editions ==
The first edition was published in 1998 as A Dictionary of Modern American Usage, and released in an abridged, paperback edition in 2000 as The Oxford Dictionary of American Usage and Style.

In 2003, the second full edition was published under the title Garner's Modern American Usage, with one-third more content than the original edition. A third edition was published under that title in August 2009.

An updated edition covering British and other World Englishes was released in April 2016 under the title Garner's Modern English Usage. It was notable for using the Google Ngram Viewer to compare some 2,300 ratios of standard versus variant forms of usages, e.g., "Current ratio (harked back vs. harped back): 170:1" (Garner 2016, p. 452).

This was followed by something of a companion volume, The Chicago Guide to Grammar, Usage, and Punctuation (University of Chicago Press, May 2016), Garner's major expansion of his chapter on the topic in the last several editions of The Chicago Manual of Style.

The fifth edition was published in 2022.

== Reception ==
Author David Foster Wallace wrote, "The fact of the matter is that Garner's dictionary is extremely good .... Its format ... includes entries on individual words and phrases and expostulative small-cap mini-essays." (An unabridged, much lengthier version of Wallace's essay, "Authority and American Usage", appears in his 2005 anthology of essays Consider the Lobster.) He commended Garner's stance on the linguistic descriptivism versus prescriptivism debate that lexicographers (dictionary writers) face. Garner's dictionary is prescriptive in aiming to uphold good English usage, but also concedes to variant forms and usage errors that are so widespread that there is no lexicographical hope of changing them.

Garrison Keillor has called Garner's Modern American Usage one of the five most influential books in his library. Other critics, including John Simon, William Safire, and Bill Walsh have praised the book's clear, simple, and nuanced guidance.

Michael Quinion of WorldWideWords.org said in his review that usage guides "row a course against the current of modern lexicography and linguistics", descriptive fields that often fail to "meet the day-to-day needs of those users of English who want to speak and write in a way that is acceptable to educated opinion". Quinion wrote that Garner lays down rules without falling victim to "worn-out shibboleths or language superstitions".

In a study that compared Garner's usage guide to Henry Fowler's, Robin Straaijer said that the two have many similarities. He pointed out that Garner (who had expressed his admiration for Fowler's work) had organized his book in a similar format and agreed with Fowler on many usage debates.

== Similar works ==
- Modern American Usage by Wilson Follett
- A Dictionary of Modern English Usage by Henry W. Fowler
- The Elements of Style by Strunk and White
- The Chicago Manual of Style, by the University of Chicago Press
- The Complete Plain Words by Sir Ernest Gowers
- The Cambridge Guide to English Usage by Pam Peters
- The Most Common Errors in English Usage and How to Avoid Them by Elaine Bender.
- When Bad Grammar Happens to Good People: How to Avoid Common Errors in English by Ann Batko
- Plain Style by Christopher Lasch
- Merriam-Webster's Dictionary of English Usage by Merriam-Webster
- Usage and Abusage by Eric Partridge
- The New Fowler's Modern English Usage by R. W. Burchfield
- The King's English by H. W. Fowler and F. G. Fowler
- The Standard of Usage in English by Thomas R. Lounsbury
- Writer's Guide and Index to English by Porter G. Perrin
- Dos, Don'ts & Maybes of English Usage by Theodore M. Bernstein
- On Writing Well by William Zinsser
- How to Be Brief: An Index to Simple Writing by Rudolf Flesch.
