= Follett's Modern American Usage =

Book by Wilson Follett

Modern American Usage
- Author: Wilson Follett
- Language: English
- Subject: Style guide
- Publisher: Hill & Wang
- Publication date: 1966
- Publication place: United States
- Pages: 436

Follett's Modern American Usage is the book published with the title Modern American Usage which was left in draft form and unfinished by Wilson Follett at his death. It was completed and edited by his friend Jacques Barzun in collaboration with six other editors. It is a usage guide for contemporary American English. Modern American Usage covers issues of usage, prose composition, and style, including English grammar, syntax, and literary techniques.

== Pre-publication ==
Wilson Follett devoted his last years to composing a book on a subject he had studied all his life: the usage of American English. However, when he died more than two-thirds of the manuscript were still in first draft. People who had read this draft felt that it would be intolerable for this work never to be published, so his friend Jacques Barzun undertook the task of finishing and revising the work on the understanding that he would have help. This came from a group of writers and teachers of English: Carlos Baker, Frederick W. Dupee, Dudley Fitts, James D. Hart, Phyllis McGinley, and Lionel Trilling.

== Editions and related books ==
The first edition was published in 1966 as Modern American Usage, in both hardback and paperback editions. In 1979, an edition edited by Erik Wensberg appeared and this was reissued in hardback in 1998.

== Reception ==
As the quotations that follow show, Follett was generally compared favourably with Fowler, doing for Americans, as it were, what Fowler had done for the writer of British English. He was considered by expert reviewers to have struck the right balance of prescriptivity and to have trodden the right line between outdated, schoolmarmish rules and laissez-faire liberality in matters of grammar and usage.

The novelist, poet, literary critic and journalist Malcolm Cowley reckoned that the Guide was "Sensible, vigorous, and cogent ... Follett deserves a place on the shelf beside Fowler."

Poet and critic Mark Van Doren wrote "This is a book that any conscientious writer will continue to consult as long as he lives."

Clifton Fadiman wrote: "A work comparable to Fowler's classic Modern English Usage."

Eliot Fremont-Smith wrote in The New York Times: "Few have been more outspoken [in their attack on the permissive view] than the late Wilson Follett; and his Modern American Usage ... may be taken as the most detailed and sustained attack so far on the notion that anything goes – or should go."

The critic and author Louis Kronenberger wrote that Follett's book was "the most highminded book of its kind since Fowler, and perhaps the only book with comparable credentials, sensibilities, and standards."

== See also ==
- Disputes in English grammar
- Elegant variation

== Similar works ==
- A Dictionary of Modern English Usage, by Henry W. Fowler
- The Elements of Style, by Strunk and White
- The Chicago Manual of Style, the authoritative guide to American English publishing style and markup
- The Complete Plain Words by Sir Ernest Gowers
- Garner's Modern American Usage
