= Elegant variation =

Use of synonyms to avoid repetition

Elegant variation is the use of synonyms to avoid repetition or add variety. The term was introduced in 1906 by H. W. Fowler and F. G. Fowler in The King's English. In their meaning of the term, they focus particularly on instances when the word being avoided is a noun or its pronoun. The Fowlers recommend that "variations should take place only when there is some awkwardness, such as ambiguity or noticeable monotony, in the word avoided".

== History ==
Henry Fowler's later Dictionary of Modern English Usage, published in 1926, keeps the same definition, but more explicitly cautions against overuse of variations or synonyms by writers who are "intent on expressing themselves prettily", rather than "conveying their meaning clearly", adding that "there are few literary faults so prevalent." Fowler then quotes examples of when variations should have been used, and when they should not have been used.

Since the term was established in 1906, it has been referred to in style and usage guides, but the original meaning has seen a number of variations. For example Bryan A. Garner suggests that when Fowler uses the word "elegant", he actually means the opposite—"inelegant"—because, according to Garner, at the time Fowler wrote, the word "elegant" was an "almost pejorative" word. Garner also claims that Fowler used the term elegant variation to refer to the "practice of never using the same word twice in the same sentence or passage". That is not Fowler's definition, and, as Richard W. Bailey points out, in misrepresenting Fowler, "Garner has created a linguist made of straw". Nevertheless, following Garner, inelegant variation has been used by others, including Gerald Lebovits and Wayne Schiess.

The term second mention is used for cases where a journalist employs an extended and often playful synonym when mentioning something for the second time in an article, such as referring to a banana as "the elongated yellow fruit".

== Examples ==
- In The King's English (1906), H. W. Fowler gives as an example this passage from The Times:

The Emperor received yesterday and to-day General Baron von Beck ... It may therefore be assumed with some confidence that the terms of a feasible solution are maturing themselves in His Majesty's mind and may form the basis of further negotiations with Hungarian party leaders when the Monarch goes again to Budapest.

The Emperor, His Majesty, and the Monarch all refer to the same person. Fowler points out that such extreme variations make it difficult to follow the sense of the sentence when the reader is distracted by "wondering what the King will be called next time". If a writer must choose between "monotonous repetition" and "clumsy variation", which are both undesirable, Fowler suggests picking the one that seems natural.

- Among sub-editors at The Guardian, "gratuitous synonyms" are called "povs", an acronym of "popular orange vegetables"—a phrase that was removed from the draft of an article about carrots in the Liverpool Echo. Charles W. Morton similarly wrote of an "elongated yellow fruit", a presumed synonym of "banana" that was used in the Boston Evening Transcript.
- Garner's Modern American Usage cites examples given by Morton, including "elongated yellow fruit" and others: pool balls ("the numbered spheroids"); Bluebeard ("the azure-whiskered wife slayer"); Easter-egg hunt ("hen-fruit safari"); milk ("lacteal fluid"); oysters ("succulent bivalves"); peanut ("the succulent goober"); songbird ("avian songster"); truck ("rubber-tired mastodon of the highway").
- The science fiction writing guide Turkey City Lexicon calls elegant variations the "Burly Detective" Syndrome after the character Mike Shayne who is called by euphemisms such as "the burly detective" or "the red-headed sleuth" in the series.

== In French ==
In French the use of elegant variations is considered essential for good style. A humorist imagined writing a news article about Gaston Defferre: "It's OK to say Defferre once, but not twice. So next you say the Mayor of Marseille. Then, the Minister of Planning. Then, the husband of Edmonde. Then, Gaston. Then, Gastounet and then... Well, then you stop talking about him because you don't know what to call him next."

== See also ==
- Horror aequi
- Antonomasia, the use of an epithet to name a person
- Kenning, a figuratively phrased compound term used in place of a simple single-word noun
- Pleonasm, a redundancy in a phrased expression
- Purple prose
- Sobriquet
