= Barbara Follett =

Barbara Follett may refer to:

- Barbara Follett (politician) (born 1942), British Labour Party politician
- Barbara Newhall Follett (1914–?), American child prodigy novelist
