= Ben Yagoda =

American writer and educator (born 1954)

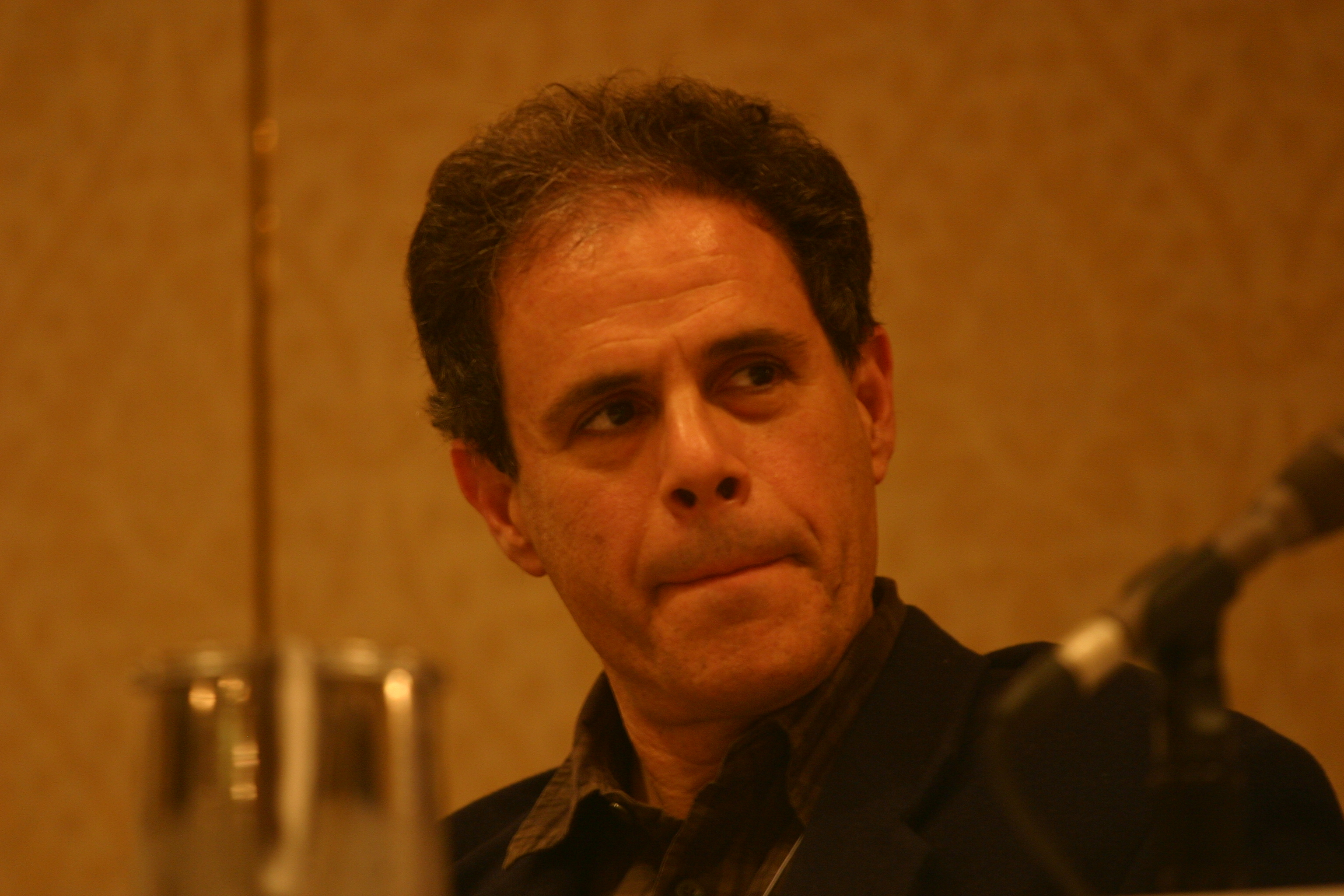
- Yagoda speaking at the Third Coast Audio Festival, 21 October 2005
- Born: February 22, 1954 (age 72); New York City, U.S.
- Education: Yale University; University of Pennsylvania
- Notable credit(s): The New Leader, The New York Times, Newsweek, Rolling Stone

Ben Yagoda (born February 22, 1954) is an American writer and educator. He is a professor of journalism and English at the University of Delaware.

== Early life and education ==
Born in New York City to Louis Yagoda (1909–1990), a labor mediator and arbitrator with the New York State Mediation Board, visiting lecturer at the Cornell University School of Industrial and Labor Relations, and a former organizer for the Amalgamated Clothing Workers of America, and Harriet (née Lewis), he grew up in New Rochelle, New York. He entered Yale University to study English in 1971 and graduated in 1976 with a Bachelor of Arts degree. He later earned an M.A. in American civilization at the University of Pennsylvania, in 1991.

== Career ==
He became a freelance journalist for publications such as The New Leader, The New York Times, Newsweek, and Rolling Stone. He has published a number of books including About Town: The New Yorker and the World it Made.

Besides his work as a journalism and English professor at the University of Delaware, Yagoda also writes occasionally for a New York Times blog about the English language. He also wrote an article on Henry W. Fowler and his A Dictionary of Modern English Usage for The New Yorker.

He currently has a monthly podcast called The Lives They're Living with Ben Yagoda.

== Personal life ==
Yagoda resides in Swarthmore, Pennsylvania, with his wife. They have two daughters.

== Selected bibliography ==
- Will Rogers: A Biography (Alfred A. Knopf, 1993, ISBN 0-394-58512-7)
- The Art of Fact: A Historical Anthology of Literary Journalism (Scribner, 1997, ISBN 0-684-83041-8), co-edited with Kevin Kerrane
- About Town: The New Yorker and the World It Made (Scribner, 2000, ISBN 0-684-81605-9)
- The Sound on the Page: Style and Voice in Writing (HarperResource, 2004, ISBN 0-066-21417-3)
- When You Catch an Adjective, Kill It: The Parts of Speech, for Better and/or Worse (Broadway Books, 2007, ISBN 0-767-92077-5)
- Memoir: A History (Riverhead Books, 2008, ISBN 1-594-48886-X)
- How to Not Write Bad: The Most Common Writing Problems and How to Avoid Them (Riverhead Books, 2013, ISBN 1-594-48848-7)
- The B-Side: The Death of Tin Pan Alley and the Rebirth of the Great American Song (Riverhead Books, 2015, ISBN 1-594-48849-5)
