= King's English =

King's English may refer to:

- Received Pronunciation, a form of English language pronunciation
- The King's English, a book on English usage and grammar, first published in 1906
- The Reversed Sicilian, a chess opening
