= False scent =

A false scent or false trail is an incorrect scent which may mislead an animal which hunts by smell, especially a hound. This may be the result of deliberate interference by a hunt saboteur or it may be a form of control by the master. Aniseed, a red herring or the entrails of a rabbit are commonly used for this purpose. The term red herring comes from this practice.

== Metaphorical usage ==
In the first and second editions of A Dictionary of Modern English Usage Fowler uses the heading false scent to explain writing that causes the reader to second-guess: because the writer knows what is coming ahead, he may forget that his reader does not, and unwittingly "lay false scent" by writing something ambiguous that can only be disambiguated later in the text (for example "I looked at the man with the telescope, and watched him put the telescope away"). The reader, once he realises he has been distracted, must go back and rescan the sentence or paragraph to understand the writer's intended meaning.
