= Birth name =

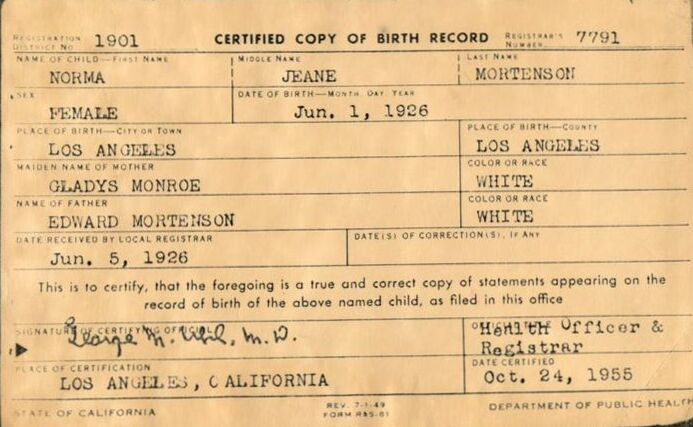
The birth certificate of Marilyn Monroe displays her birth name: Norma Jeane Mortenson.

A birth name is the name of a person given when they are born. The term may be applied to the surname, the given name, or the full name. Where births are officially registered, the full birth name entered onto a birth register or birth certificate may become the person's legal name by that fact alone.

== Maiden and married names ==
The terms née (feminine) and né (masculine; both pronounced /neɪ/; from French né[e] 'born') are used to indicate a pre-marital maiden name or a birth name that was later changed. The term née has feminine grammatical gender and is used to denote a woman's surname at birth; né is the equivalent term for men. In most English-speaking cultures, née is specifically used to indicate a woman's maiden name after her surname is changed due to marriage. The diacritic marks (the acute accent) are considered significant to its spelling, and ultimately its meaning, but they are sometimes omitted. According to Oxford University's Dictionary of Modern English Usage, the terms are typically placed after the current surname; for example, 'Ann Smith, née Jones' or 'Adam Smith, né Jones' would represent people with the birth surname 'Jones' and current surname 'Smith'. Because these terms were adopted into English from French, they do not have to be italicized, but often are.

== See also ==
- Coverture
- Deadnaming
- Surname
