= The House Without Windows =

1927 novel by Barbara Newhall Follett

- Author: Barbara Newhall Follett
- Published: 1927
- Publisher: Alfred A. Knopf
- Publication place: United States
- OCLC: 870940
- Text: The House Without Windows at Wikisource

The House Without Windows & Eepersip's Life There is a 1927 novel by Barbara Newhall Follett. With the guidance and support of Follet's father, critic and editor Wilson Follett, it was published by Alfred A. Knopf in 1927 when Follett was just 12. The novel was reviewed favorably by The New York Times, the Saturday Review, and H. L. Mencken.
