= Blairism =

Political ideology of Tony Blair

In British politics, Blairism is the political ideology of Tony Blair, the former leader of the Labour Party and Prime Minister between 1997 and 2007, and those that support him, known as Blairites. It entered the New Penguin English Dictionary in 2000. Elements of the ideology include investment in public services, expansionary efforts in education to encourage social mobility, and increased actions in terms of mass surveillance alongside a ramping up of law enforcement powers, both of these latter changes advocated in the context of fighting organised crime and terrorism. Blairites have additionally been known for their contrast with the traditional support for socialism by those believing in left-wing politics, with Blair himself and others speaking out against the nationalisation of major industries and against also heavy regulations of business operations. On foreign policy, Blairism is supportive of close relations with the United States and liberal interventionism, including advocacy for both the Iraq war and the War in Afghanistan (2001–2021).

== Ideology ==
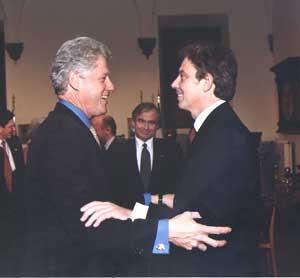
U.S. President Bill Clinton (left) meets with Prime Minister Blair (right) in November 1999, with the American leader being a close political partner given their mutual Atlanticist views and shared emphasis on the Special Relationship.

Politically, Blair has been identified with record investment into public services, an interventionist and Atlanticist foreign policy, support for stronger law enforcement powers, a large focus on surveillance as a means to address terrorism and a large focus on education as a means to encourage social mobility. In the early years (circa 1994–1997), Blairism was also associated with support for European integration and particularly British participation in the European single currency, though this waned after Labour took office.

The term is used in particular in contrast to Brownite, to identify those within the Labour Party who supported Gordon Brown rather than Blair. However, with Blair and Brown typically in agreement on most political issues (from Iraq to public sector reform), some commentators have noted that "the difference between Brownites and Blairites [...] is more tribal than ideological". This is believed to stem from a personal disagreement between Blair and Brown over who should run for the leadership following the death of John Smith in 1994. Though Brown was originally considered the senior of the two, he waited until after Smith's funeral to begin campaigning, by which point Blair had gathered too much momentum to be defeated. However, in his book Whatever it Takes, Steve Richards offered an alternate view: that there were significant disagreements between the two about relative poverty, the level of public spending and the potential for choice in public services.

In a 1999 article, The Economist stated:

Mr Blair will doubtless do his duty and lavish praise on Labour's glorious past. But, in truth, Mr Blair has always displayed a marked ambivalence towards Labour history. His greatest achievement in opposition was to get the party to ditch their historic commitment to nationalisation, and to water down its traditional links with the unions. At times he has even hinted that the very foundation of the Labour Party was a mistake, since it divided "progressive" politics and led to a century dominated by the Conservatives. Mr Blair knows that all this makes many of his party faithful deeply uneasy.

Blair's tenure is known for an expansion of LGBT rights, such as the introduction of civil partnerships. Blair told the LGBT organisation Stonewall that "what has happened is that the culture of the country has changed in a definable way" and that "it's a thing that doesn't just give me a lot of pride, but it has actually brought a lot of joy". Blair has also stated that he got up off his seat and danced upon seeing the first civil partnership ceremonies on television.

== Relationship to prior administrations ==
The Daily Telegraph stated in April 2008 that Blair's programme, with its emphasis on "New Labour", accepted the free-market ideology of Thatcherism. The article cited deregulation, privatisation of key national industries, maintaining a flexible labour market, marginalising the role of trade unions and devolving government decision making to local authorities as evidence. He also sought a closer, better relationship with Europe, and considered joining the Euro currency, but Gordon Brown was not in favour.

In the BBC Four documentary film Tory! Tory! Tory!, Blair is described as personally admiring Margaret Thatcher deeply and making the decision that she would be the first outside person he formally invited to visit him in 10 Downing Street.

Former Conservative Prime Minister John Major, who Blair defeated in a landslide at the 1997 general election; was one of the original figures behind the Northern Ireland peace process that Blair continued and both of them campaigned together in support of the Good Friday Agreement.

Blair privately called Thatcher "unhinged", a description that later became public knowledge. Blair criticised the Thatcher government's record on poverty and made that a key issue for Labour economic policy. He made the goal to eradicate child poverty in Britain within 20 years based on the fact that one-third of British children were in poverty post-Thatcher compared to the 9% rate in 1979 (although these statistics are disputed).

In a 2001 speech to a Conservative election rally, Thatcher called New Labour 'rootless and soulless' saying that at least Old Labour stood for certain principles, that she respected them, and also said Blair did not truly believe in liberty. She also claimed the Labour government would give up the British pound to join the Euro.

Blair also abolished Section 28 and created more pro-European initiatives compared to Thatcher.

In his 2010 autobiography, A Journey, Blair remarked:

In what caused much jarring and tutting within the party, I even decided to own up to supporting changes Margaret Thatcher had made. I knew the credibility of the whole New Labour project rested on accepting that much of what she wanted to do in the 1980s was inevitable, a consequence not of ideology but of social and economic change. The way she did it was often very ideological, sometimes unnecessarily so, but that didn't alter the basic fact: Britain needed the industrial and economic reforms of the Thatcher period.

== Relationship to later administrations ==
Gordon Brown succeeded Tony Blair as Prime Minister after Brown's long tenure as the Chancellor of the Exchequer. Although viewed in the media as somewhat personally close, Blair later wrote in his autobiography A Journey that a "maddening" Brown effectively blackmailed him while he was in 10 Downing Street. Blair accused Brown of orchestrating the investigation into the Cash-for-Honours scandal and stated that the personal animosity was so strong that it led him to frequent drinking, a big change for Blair. Blair also has told journalist Andrew Marr that as their years working together went on, co-operation became "hard going on impossible".

Blair criticised the departure from much of New Labour ideology under Gordon Brown's premiership, who blamed it for Labour's defeat in the 2010 General Election:

Why did Labour lose the 2010 election? The answer to that, I'm afraid is obvious. Labour won when it was New Labour. It lost because it stopped being New Labour...Had he [Brown] pursued New Labour policy, the personal issue would still have made victory tough, but it wouldn't have been impossible. Departing from New Labour made it so. Just as the 2005 election was one we were never going to lose, 2010 was one we were never going to win – once the fatal strategic decision was taken to abandon the New Labour position.

== Impact on the Labour Party ==
The Labour Party leadership of Jeremy Corbyn was seen as a departure from Blairism, and a return of Old Labour, and was described as a 'return of the 1940s Labour Party' by The Guardian, with its emphasis on re-nationalisation of energy, water, and railways and massive public investment in housing and the NHS. Jeremy Corbyn was critical of Blair's involvement in Iraq and voted against it at the time, garnering much support particularly from the youth vote. Labour increased its vote share by over 9% in 2017, costing Theresa May her majority in Parliament, but with the party split by Brexit policy and identitarian infighting, it lost the 2019 election to Boris Johnson's Conservatives.

Since the election of Keir Starmer as Leader of the Labour Party in 2020, some in the British media have noted the ideological shift from the left back to the centre, allowing comparisons to be drawn between the current policy platform of the Labour Party and its Shadow Ministers (some of whom served in the cabinets of Blair and Brown) and that of New Labour.

The November 2021 shadow cabinet reshuffle was seen to be giving more power to Blairites in the Parliamentary Labour Party. This was criticised by former Shadow Chancellor of the Exchequer John McDonnell. In May 2022, on the 25th anniversary of Labour's landslide victory in the 1997 election, Blair in a video looked back at the victory and his achievements and showed his support for Starmer.

The 2023 British shadow cabinet reshuffle was seen as giving even more power to Blairites within the Labour Party.

== Blairites ==
Other than Blair himself, the following prominent Labour politicians are often considered Blairites, but may not identify themselves as such:

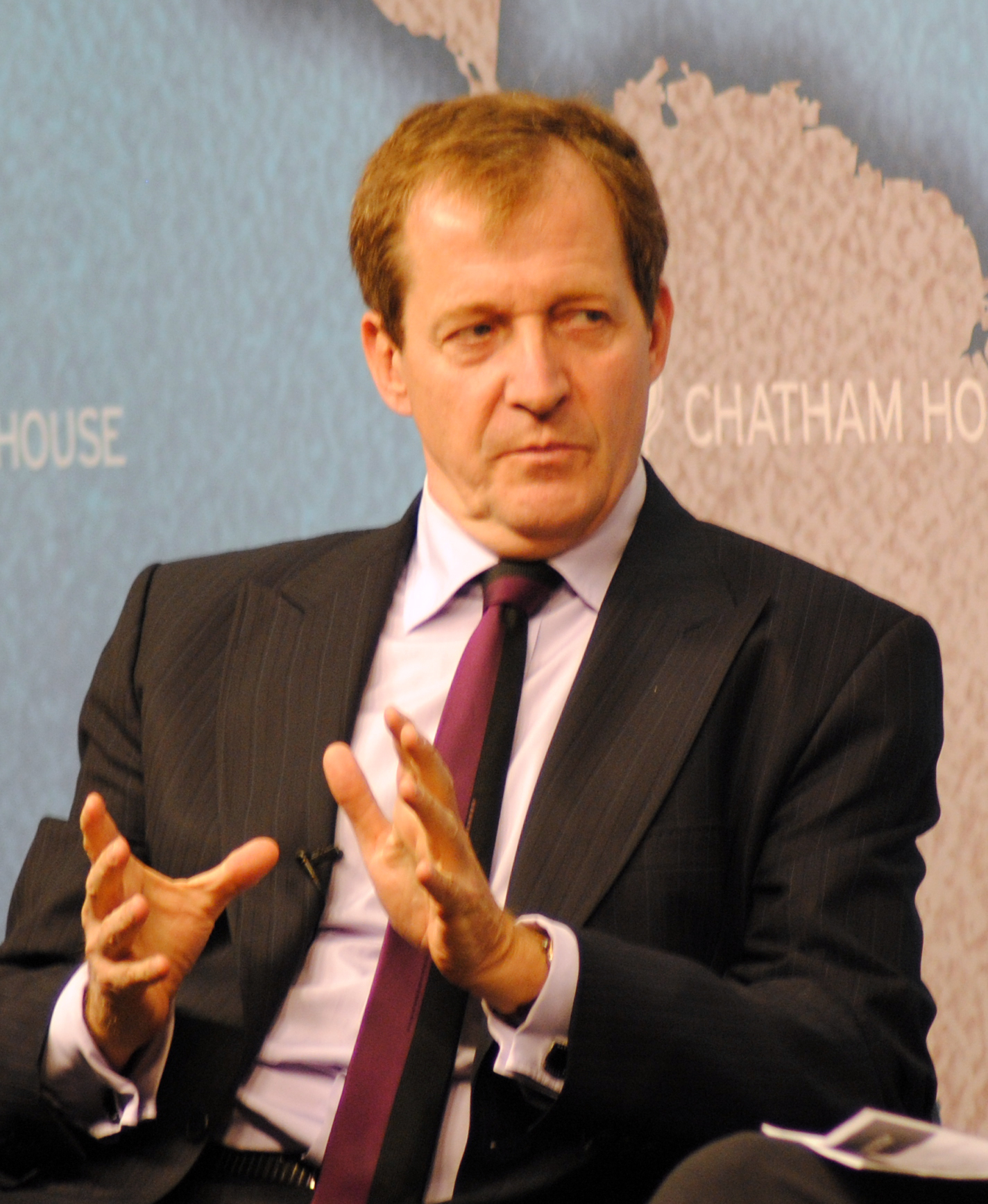
Alastair Campbell

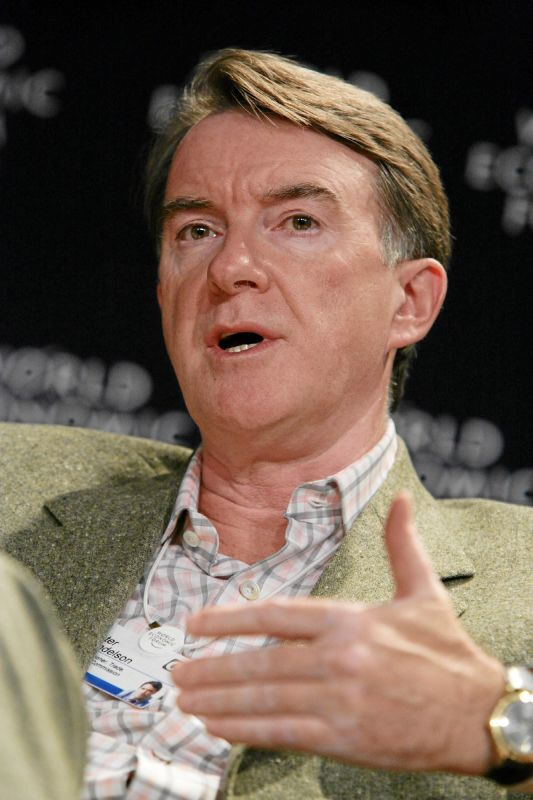
Peter Mandelson

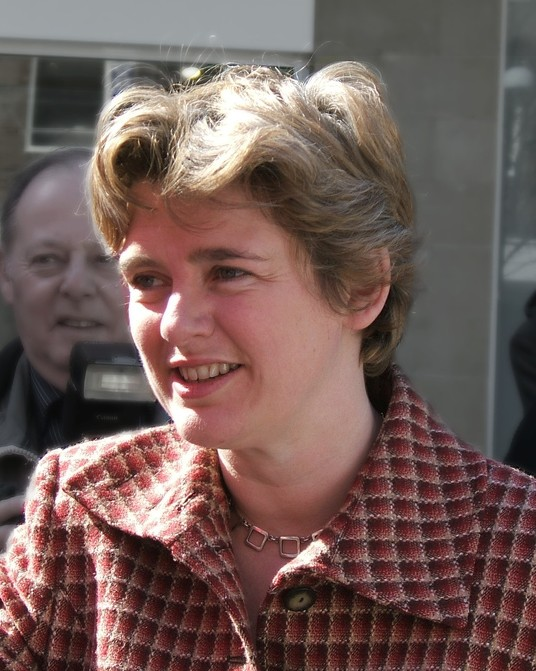
Ruth Kelly

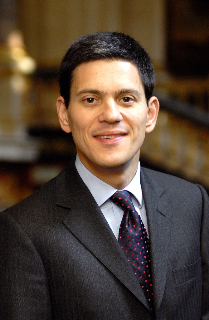
David Miliband

- Alastair Campbell – Blair's spokesman and campaign director (1994–1997), Downing Street Press Secretary and as the Prime Minister's Official Spokesperson (1997–2000), Downing Street Director of Communications and spokesman for the Labour Party (2000–2003). Campaign director for Blair's third election win in 2005.
- Andrew Adonis – former Shadow Minister for Infrastructure and Economic Delivery and former Transport Secretary
- Valerie Amos – Under-Secretary-General for Humanitarian Affairs and Emergency Relief Coordinator, British High Commissioner to Australia and the first black woman to serve in the Cabinet
- Hilary Armstrong – former Minister for the Cabinet Office and Chief Whip
- Hazel Blears – former Secretary of State for Communities and Local Government
- David Blunkett – former Home Secretary
- Stephen Byers – former Secretary of State for Transport, Local Government and the Regions and former MP
- Ben Bradshaw – former Culture Secretary
- Liam Byrne – former Shadow Work and Pensions Secretary.
- Charles Clarke – former Home Secretary and former MP who lost his seat at the 2010 general election
- Charles Falconer – former Lord Chancellor
- Caroline Flint – former Shadow Secretary of State for Energy and Climate Change
- Tom Harris – former MP
- Patricia Hewitt – former Secretary of State for Health and former MP
- Margaret Hodge – former chair of the Public accounts committee
- Geoff Hoon – former Secretary of State for Defence
- Tristram Hunt – former MP for Stoke-on-Trent Central
- Owen Smith – former MP for Pontypridd and Shadow Secretary of State for Northern Ireland.
- John Hutton – former Secretary of State for Defence, MP and head of a commission into public sector pensions for the Conservative-Liberal Democrat coalition
- Tessa Jowell – former Culture Secretary
- Alan Johnson – former Home Secretary
- Darren Jones – Chief Secretary to the Treasury
- Sally Keeble – former MP for Northampton North
- Ruth Kelly – former Cabinet minister and economist
- Liz Kendall – Secretary of State for Work and Pensions and 2015 Labour Party leadership candidate
- Oona King – Former MP for Bethnal Green and Bow who lost her seat to George Galloway and the defeated candidate to be Labour's candidate for the Mayoralty of London
- Peter Mandelson – former First Secretary of State and spin doctor
- Wes Streeting – Secretary of State for Health
- Alan Milburn – former Secretary of State for Health, MP and Social Mobility Tsar under the Conservative-Liberal Democrat coalition.
- David Miliband – former Foreign Secretary and defeated 2010 Labour Party leadership candidate
- Estelle Morris – former Secretary of State for Education and currently a peer
- Sally Morgan – former director of Government Relations, Minister for Women and chair of Ofsted
- Jim Murphy – former Secretary of State for Scotland and Leader of the Scottish Labour Party 2014–15.
- James Purnell – former Secretary of State for Work and Pensions
- John Reid – former Home Secretary
- Jacqui Smith – former Home Secretary

== See also ==
- Brownism
- Clintonism
- Taking Liberties (film)
- Thatcherism
- Third Way
