= Brownism =

Political ideology of Gordon Brown

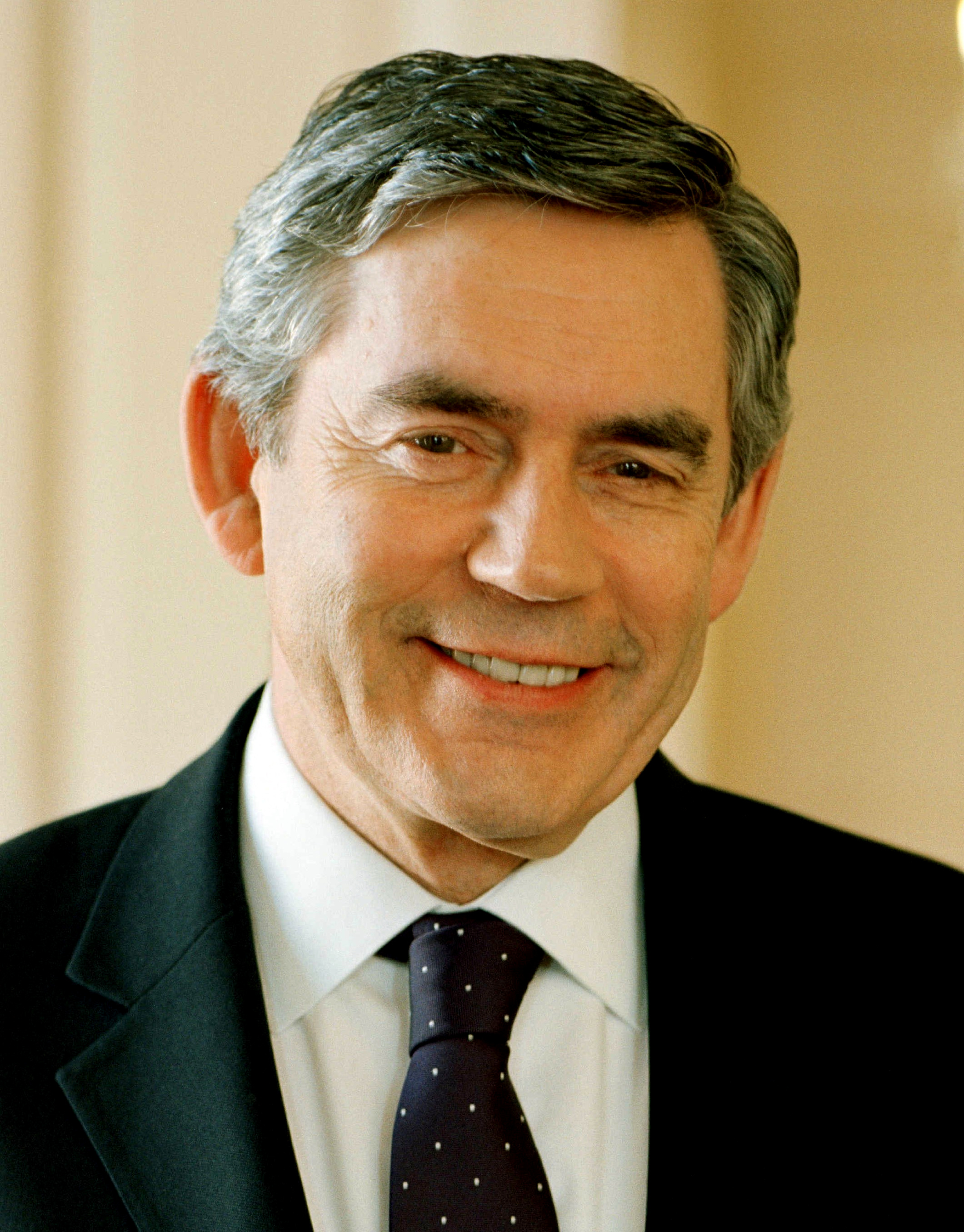
Gordon Brown, after whom Brownism is named

Brownism is the social democratic political ideology of the former Prime Minister of the United Kingdom and leader of the Labour Party Gordon Brown and those that follow him. Proponents of Brownism are referred to as Brownites.

== Ideology ==
Brownism is understood by Anthony Giddens and others as a social democratic ideology, characterised by its distinction from the ideology of New Labour under Tony Blair, with Brownism generally understood as tolerating less enthusiasm about market driven reforms such as tuition fees and foundation hospitals, more keen on the role of the state, and less critical of Labour's links to the unions. Compared to Blairism, Brownism places more emphasis on constitutional reform, advancing ideas of a "new constitutional settlement", alongside a "robust concern for redistributive politics" with commitments to reducing poverty and expanding the welfare state; Will Hutton opined: "Like Tony Blair [Gordon Brown] is a believer in a pluralist and fair society, social mobility, and marrying economic efficiency with social justice".

Brownism retains much of the economic pragmatism of New Labour, characterised by commitments to liberalised markets and "responsible capitalism", with light-touch approaches to financial regulation and tax. Brownite pragmatism was demonstrated during the 2008 Financial Crisis which occurred during the Premiership of Gordon Brown, with the UK Government response comprising the nationalisation of the Royal Bank of Scotland, Lloyds TSB and Northern Rock – with both conservative and left-leaning governments worldwide following this approach. Brown described "the values of fairness, stewardship and cooperation" as underpinning this approach to markets, and has criticised the "weaknesses of unbridled free markets".

On foreign policy, Brownism is characterised by "complexity, inter-connectedness, and cooperation", with focuses on improving globally under-developed regions, improving human rights, and global social justice – particularly through international aid. Brownism is additionally characterised by significantly greater hesitance towards liberal interventionism compared to Blairism, with focuses on foreign policy advanced through cooperation, and hesitance towards conflict. It emphasises "duties to discharge and responsibilities to keep" where conflict does take place, and places greater distance towards US foreign policy, while retaining commitments to Atlanticism.

Brownism has been described as lacking an "ideological narrative", something that has been said to have damaged Gordon Brown's "credibility as Labour leader". This has meant that scholars and observers have been able to describe Brownism as neoliberal, while others have described it as social democratic.

== Relationship to prior administrations ==
Gordon Brown succeeded Tony Blair as Prime Minister after Brown's long tenure as the Chancellor of the Exchequer. Although viewed in the media as somewhat personally close, Blair later wrote in his autobiography A Journey that a "maddening" Brown effectively blackmailed him while he was in 10 Downing Street. Blair accused Brown of orchestrating the investigation into the Cash-for-Honours scandal and stated that the personal animosity was so strong that it led him to frequent drinking, a big change for Blair. Blair also has told journalist Andrew Marr that as their years working together went on, co-operation became "hard going on impossible".

Blair criticised the departure from much of New Labour ideology under Gordon Brown's premiership, who blamed it for Labour's defeat in the 2010 General Election:

Why did Labour lose the 2010 election? The answer to that, I'm afraid is obvious. Labour won when it was New Labour. It lost because it stopped being New Labour...Had he [Brown] pursued New Labour policy, the personal issue would still have made victory tough, but it wouldn't have been impossible. Departing from New Labour made it so. Just as the 2005 election was one we were never going to lose, 2010 was one we were never going to win – once the fatal strategic decision was taken to abandon the New Labour position.

== Brownites ==
Other than Brown himself, the following prominent Labour politicians are often considered Brownites, but may not identify themselves as such:

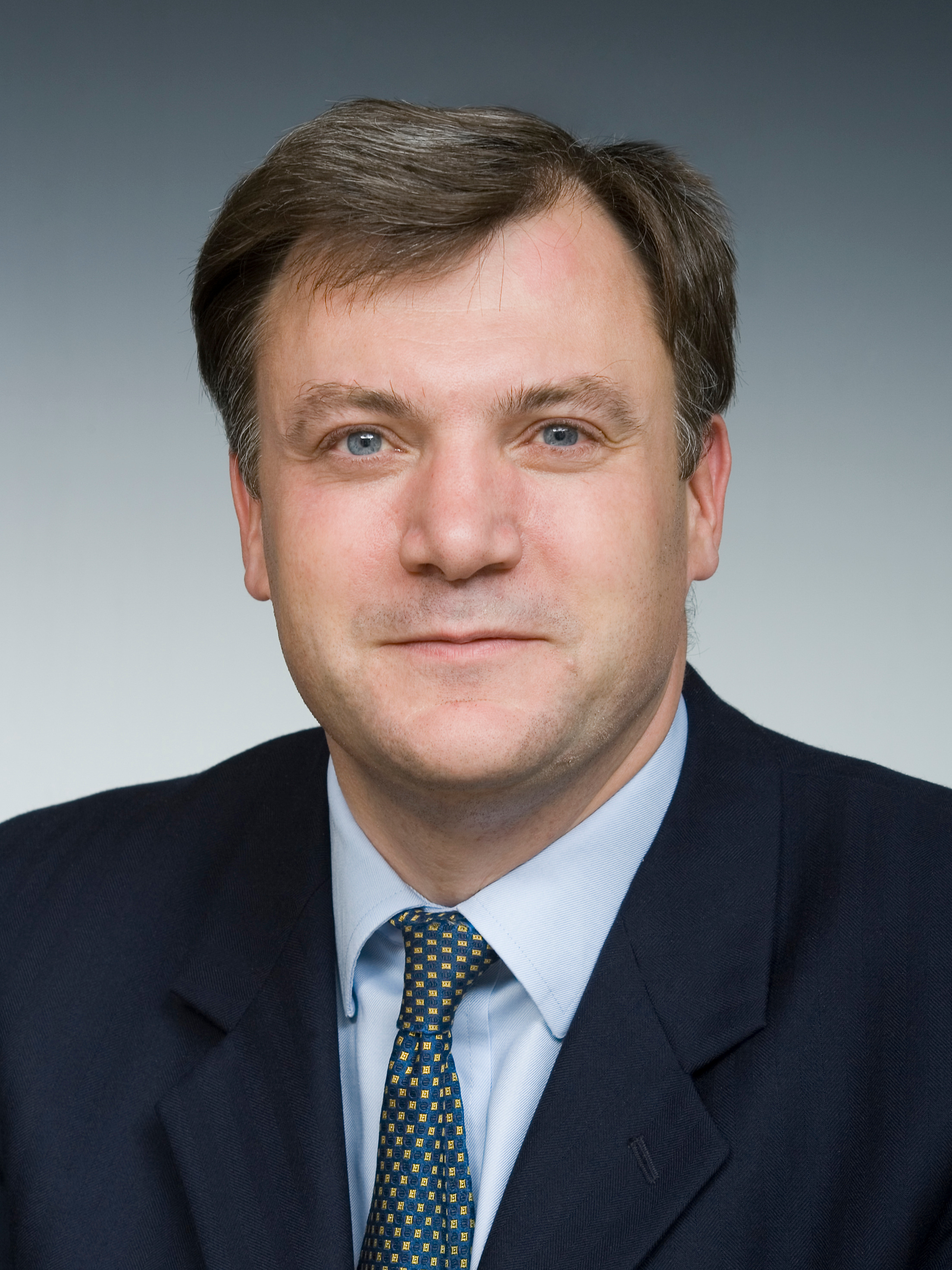
Ed Balls

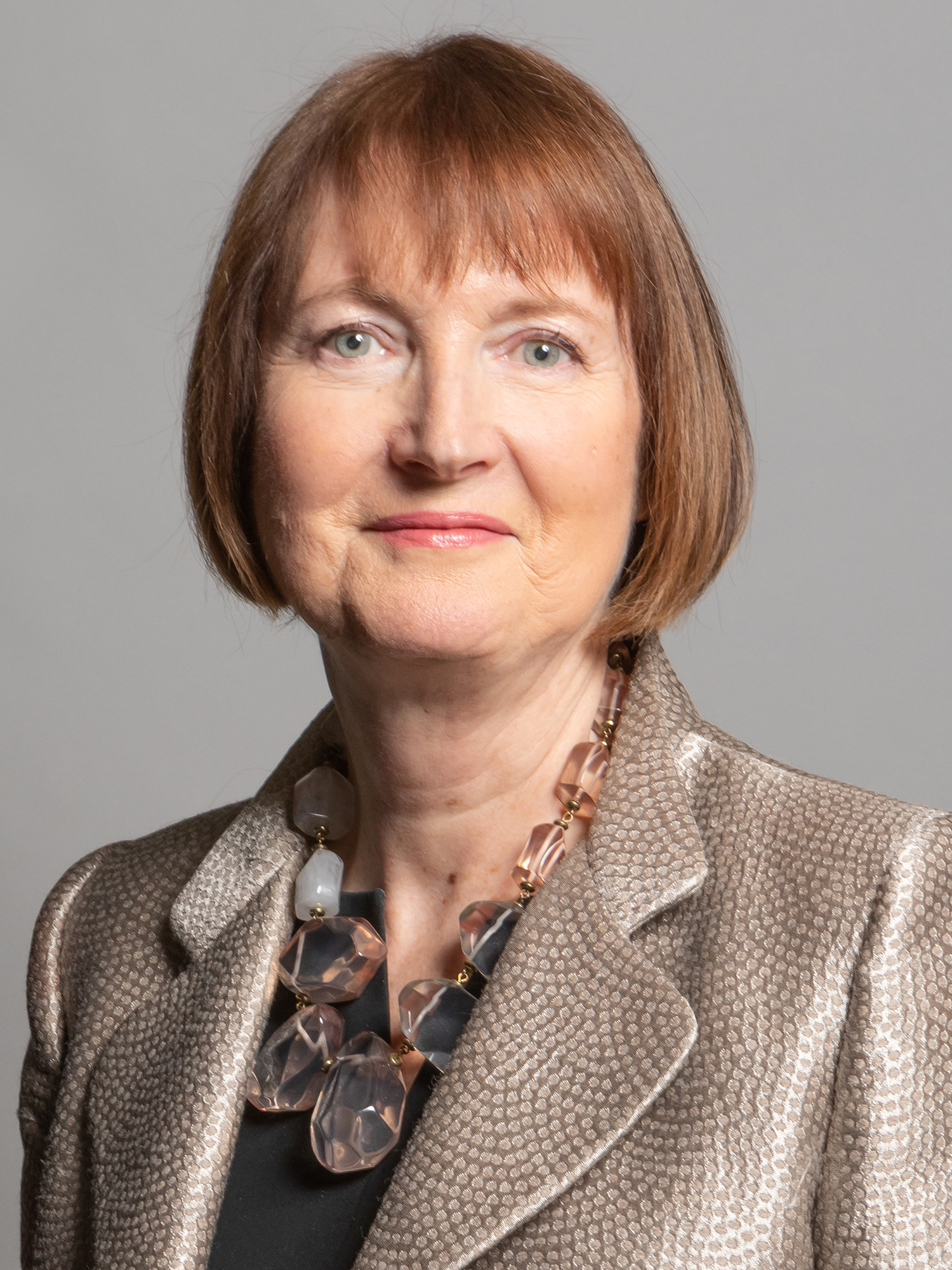
Harriet Harman

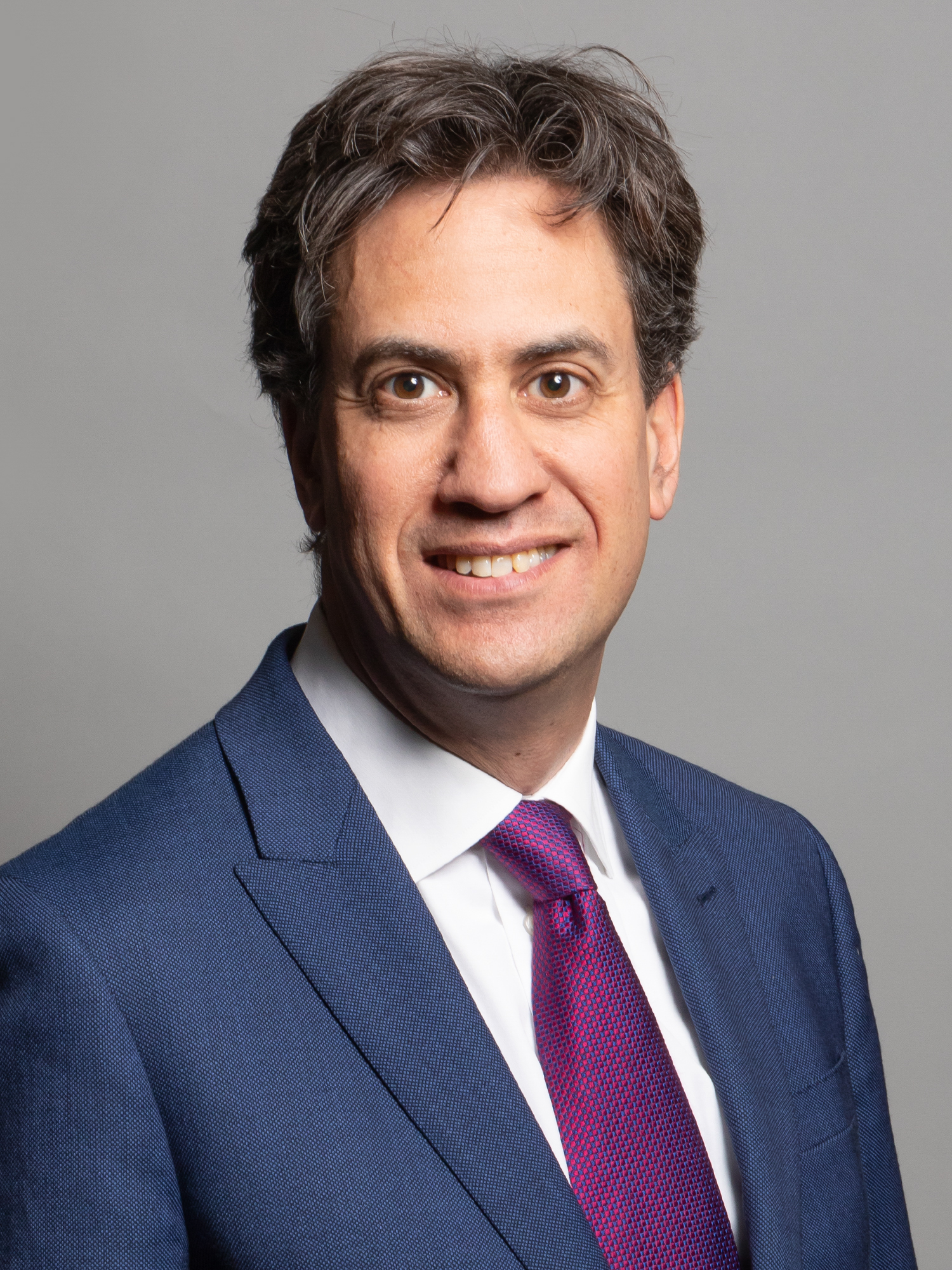
Ed Miliband

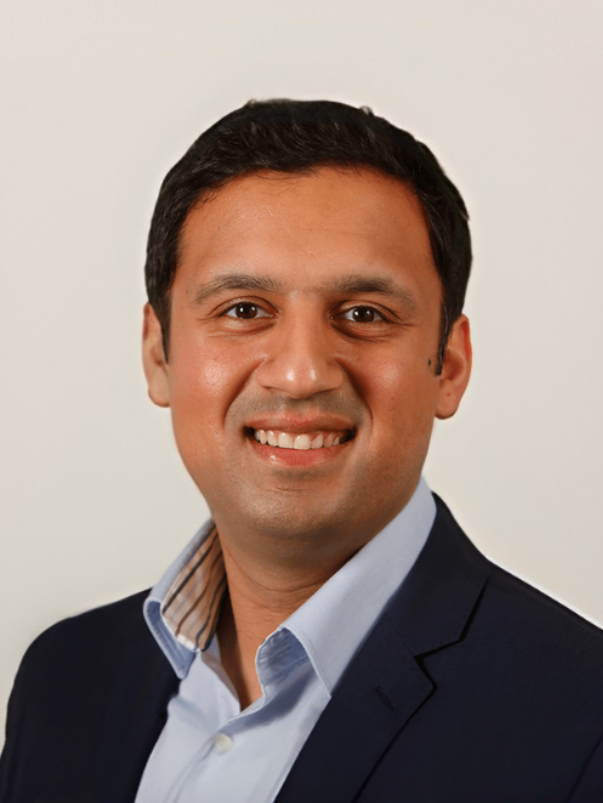
Anas Sarwar

- Douglas Alexander – Secretary of State for Scotland and former Secretary of State for International Development and Shadow Foreign Secretary
- Ian Austin – former Minister for the West Midlands
- Ed Balls – former Shadow Chancellor of the Exchequer and Secretary of State for Children, Schools and Families
- Nick Brown – former Opposition Chief Whip and Minister for the North East
- Tom Clarke – former Minister of State for Film and Tourism
- Yvette Cooper – Secretary of State for Health and Social Care, former Foreign and Home Secretary and former Work and Pensions Secretary
- Alistair Darling – former Chancellor of the Exchequer
- Donald Dewar – former First Minister of Scotland and former Leader of the Scottish Labour Party
- Michael Dugher – former Shadow Secretary of State for Culture, Media and Sport
- Nigel Griffiths – former Deputy Leader of the House of Commons
- Kevan Jones – former Shadow Minister for the Armed Forces
- Jim Knight – former Minister of State for Employment and Welfare Reform and Minister for the South West
- Spencer Livermore – Member of the House of Lords
- Tony Lloyd – former Shadow Secretary of State for Northern Ireland
- Damian McBride – former Downing Street Press Secretary
- Kerry McCarthy – former Shadow Secretary of State for Environment, Food and Rural Affairs
- Ed Miliband – Foreign Secretary and former Leader of the Labour Party
- Sue Nye – Member of the House of Lords
- Rachel Reeves – former Chancellor of the Exchequer
- Anas Sarwar – former Leader of the Scottish Labour Party
- Siôn Simon – former MP for Birmingham Erdington
- Andrew Smith – former Secretary of State for Work and Pensions and Chief Secretary to the Treasury
- Shriti Vadera – former Parliamentary Under-Secretary of State for Business, Innovation and Skills
- Emily Thornberry – Former Shadow Attorney General and former Shadow Foreign Secretary
- Charlie Whelan – former political director of the British trade union, Unite the Union
- Tom Watson – former Chair and Deputy Leader of the Labour Party
- Stewart Wood, Labour peer and former member of the Council of Economic Advisers to HM Treasury

== See also ==
- Blairism
- Blair–Brown deal
