= The Anglo-Saxon Review =

The Anglo-Saxon Review was a quarterly miscellany edited by Lady Randolph Churchill, and published in London by John Lane. It was short lived, running from June 1899 to September 1901 a total of 10 volumes. Churchill's son, Winston Churchill, was one of her devoted advisors during the months preceding publication. He suggested that the magazine take as its purpose "to preserve a permanent record of the thoughts and aspirations of our times, which vary as swiftly as light changes on running water, for wiser ages yet unborn."

It contained articles by Henry James, Winston Churchill, George Gissing, Stephen Crane, Henry De Vere Stacpoole, Robert Barr, Henry Duff Traill, Henry Swinburne, Ethel Rolt Wheeler, Henry Watson Fowler and Frank Swettenham. Each issue was bound in a copy of a magnificent antique binding. For example, the first volume was bound with a copy of the binding by an unknown craftsman of James VI and I's book of the famous Vrais portraits de la vie des hommes illustres by André Thevet Paris 1584, which bears the arms and initials of James. The subscription list included heads of state, royalty, and some of the wealthiest families of Britain and the United States. Many of the magazine's contributors, too, were members of the nobility, officers of the Church of England, members of parliament, titled servants of the crown, and foreign dignitaries.

A fictional account of the magazine's creation is provided by Robin Paige in the novel Death at Whitechapel.
