= Practical English Usage =

Reference book by Michael Swan

Practical English Usage is a standard reference book aimed at foreign learners of English and their teachers, written by Michael Swan.

Published by Oxford University Press, it has sold more than 2 million copies since the first edition was published in 1980. A new, and greatly extended second edition was published in 1995. A third edition was released in 2005, and a fourth in 2016.

== Feature ==
It features basic descriptions of English grammar and usage as well as highlighting various words that are often problematic for non-native speakers. Although the model is basically British English, it explains some of the stylistic differences between British and American usage.

The third edition also takes into account some of the most recent changes within British English, particularly the commonisation of various American English forms (such as the use of like as a conjunction – e.g. like I do).

== Influences ==
In his Acknowledgements for the first edition, Swan refers to the aid given him by "various standard reference books – in particular, the splendid A Grammar of Contemporary English, by Quirk, Greenbaum, Leech and Svartvik" (Longman, 1972), and in the second edition, to "the monumental A Comprehensive Grammar of the English Language" (Longman, 1985), by the same authors.

== See also ==
- English grammar

== Similar works ==
- The Complete Plain Words by Ernest Gowers
- A Dictionary of Modern English Usage by H. W. Fowler
