= Popular Fallacies =

Charles Lamb wrote, as Elia, 16 popular fallacies.

1. That a Bully is always a Coward
2. That Ill-gotten Gain never Prospers
3. That a Man must not Laugh at his own Jest
4. That such a One shows his Breeding.—That it is Easy to Perceive he is no Gentleman
5. That the Poor Copy the Vices of the Rich
6. That Enough is as Good as a Feast
7. Of Two Disputants, the Warmest is Generally in the Wrong
8. That Verbal Allusions are not Wit, because they will not Bear a Translation
9. That the Worst Puns are the Best
10. That Handsome is that Handsome does
11. That We must not look a Gift-horse in the Mouth
12. That Home is Home though it is never so Homely
13. That You must Love Me, and Love my Dog
14. That We should Rise with the Lark
15. That We should Lie Down with the Lamb
16. That a Sulky Temper is a Misfortune

Lamb's popular fallacies (all printed in 1826) were born in response to a specific socio-linguistic context and expose the pretences that constitute false social behavior. Three of the fallacies, “That You Must Love Me and Love My Dog,” “That We Should Lie Down With the Lamb,” and “That We Should Rise With the Lark” all feature prominent animal imagery.

== See also ==
- Essays of Elia
- Henry Watson Fowler
