= Essays of Elia =

Collection of essays written by Charles Lamb

Essays of Elia is a collection of essays written by Charles Lamb; it was first published in book form in 1823, with a second volume, Last Essays of Elia, issued in 1833 by the publisher Edward Moxon.

The essays in the collection first began appearing in The London Magazine in 1820 and continued to 1825. Lamb's essays were very popular and were printed in many subsequent editions throughout the nineteenth century. The personal and conversational tone of the essays has charmed many readers; the essays "established Lamb in the title he now holds, that of the most delightful of English essayists." Lamb himself is the Elia of the collection, and his sister Mary is "Cousin Bridget." Charles first used the pseudonym Elia for an essay on the South Sea House, where he had worked decades earlier; Elia was the last name of an Italian man who worked there at the same time as Charles, and after that essay the name stuck.

American editions of both the Essays and the Last Essays were published in Philadelphia in 1828. At the time, American publishers were unconstrained by copyright law, and often reprinted materials from English books and periodicals; so the American collection of the Last Essays preceded its British counterpart by five years.

Critics have traced the influence of earlier writers in Lamb's style, notably Sir Thomas Browne and Robert Burton – writers who also influenced Lamb's contemporary and acquaintance, Thomas De Quincey.

Some of Lamb's later pieces in the same style and spirit were collected into a body called Eliana.

== Essay of Charles Lamb ==
The following essays are included in the collection:

- "The South-Sea House"
- "Oxford In The Vacation"
- "Christ's Hospital Five-And-Thirty Years Ago"
- "The Two Races Of Men"
- "New Year's Eve"
- "Mrs Battle's Opinions On Whist"
- "A Chapter On Ears"
- "All Fools' Day"
- "A Quakers' Meeting"
- "The Old and The New Schoolmaster"
- "Valentine's Day"
- "Imperfect Sympathies"
- "Witches And Other Night-Fears"
- "My Relations"
- "Mackery End, In Hertfordshire"
- "Modern Gallantry"
- "The Old Benchers Of The Inner Temple"
- "Grace Before Meat"
- "My First Play"
- "Dream-Children; A Reverie"
- "Distant Correspondents"
- "The Praise Of Chimney-Sweepers"
- "A Complaint Of The Decay Of Beggars In The Metropolis"
- "A Dissertation Upon Roast Pig"
- "A Bachelor's Complaint Of the Behaviour Of Married People"
- "On Some Of The Old Actors"
- "On The Artificial Comedy Of The Last Century"
- "On The Acting Of Munden".

And in Last Essays of Elia:

- "Blakesmoor in H---shire"
- "Poor Relations"
- "Detached Thoughts on Books and Reading"
- "Stage Illusion"
- "To the Shade of Elliston"
- "Ellistoniana"
- "The Old Margate Hoy"
- "The Convalescent"
- "Sanity of True Genius"
- "Captain Jackson"
- "The Superannuated Man"
- "The Genteel Style of Writing"
- "Barbara S——
- "The Tombs in the Abbey"
- "Amicus Redivivus"
- "Some Sonnets of Sir Philip Sidney"
- "Newspapers Thirty-Five Years Ago"
- "Barrenness of the Imaginative Faculty in the Productions of Modern Art"
- "The Wedding"
- "Rejoicings upon the New Year's Coming of Age"
- "Old China"
- "The Child Angel; a Dream"
- "Confessions of a Drunkard"
- "Popular Fallacies".

Among the individual essays, "Dream-Children" and "Old China" are perhaps the most highly and generally admired. A short musical work by Elgar was inspired by "Dream-Children". Lamb's fondness for stage drama provided the subjects of a number of the essays: "My First Play," "Stage Illusion," "Ellistoniana," etc. "Blakesmoor in H——shire" was actually written about Blakesware in Hertfordshire, the great house where Lamb's maternal grandmother was housekeeper for many years.
