= Ethel Rolt Wheeler =

English poet, author and journalist

Ethel Rolt Wheeler (pen name Rolt Wheeler; 12 July 1869, Lewisham, London – October 1958, Glasgow) was an English poet, author and journalist.

== Biography ==
Ethel Rolt Wheeler was born Mary Ethel Wheeler, the daughter of the stone merchant Joseph Wheeler, and Amina Cooke Taylor, both of whom were of Irish descent. She wrote using the pen name "Rolt Wheeler", as did her brother, the author and occultist Francis Rolt-Wheeler. She was the granddaughter of the Cork shipbuilder Joseph Wheeler on her paternal side and author and anti-Corn law propagandist, William Cooke Taylor on her maternal side.

In the 1890s, she became a committee member of the Irish Literary Society of London and chair of the Irish Circle of the Lyceum Club.

She was a prolific author and contributed to many journals including Dome, The Theosophical Review, East and West, The Atlantic Monthly, The London Magazine, Irish Book Lover, Harper's Magazine, The Butterfly, The Anglo-Saxon Review and Great Thought as well as working for and contributing work to The Academy. She also wrote in support of the suffragette movement in articles such as Fair Ladies in Revolt in The Englishwoman's Review

In 1915, she is recorded as living at 59, Stradella Road, Herne Hill.

== Selected works ==
- Wheeler, Ethel (1903). Verses, R. Brimley Johnson;
- Wheeler, Ethel (1905). The Year’s Horoscope, sonnets, The Brochure Series
- Rolt-Wheeler, Ethel (1906). Behind the Veil, Tales, David Nutt, London
- Rolt-Wheeler, Ethel (1910). Famous Blue-Stockings, Methuen, London
- Rolt-Wheeler, Ethel (1913). Ireland’s Veils, and other poems, Elkin Mathews, London
- Rolt-Wheeler, Ethel (1913). Women of the Cell and Cloister, Methuen, London
- Gawsworth, John (ed.) (1937). Richards’ Shilling Selections from Modern Poets: Ethel Rolt-Wheeler, London
