= Instruction in Ancient Greek =

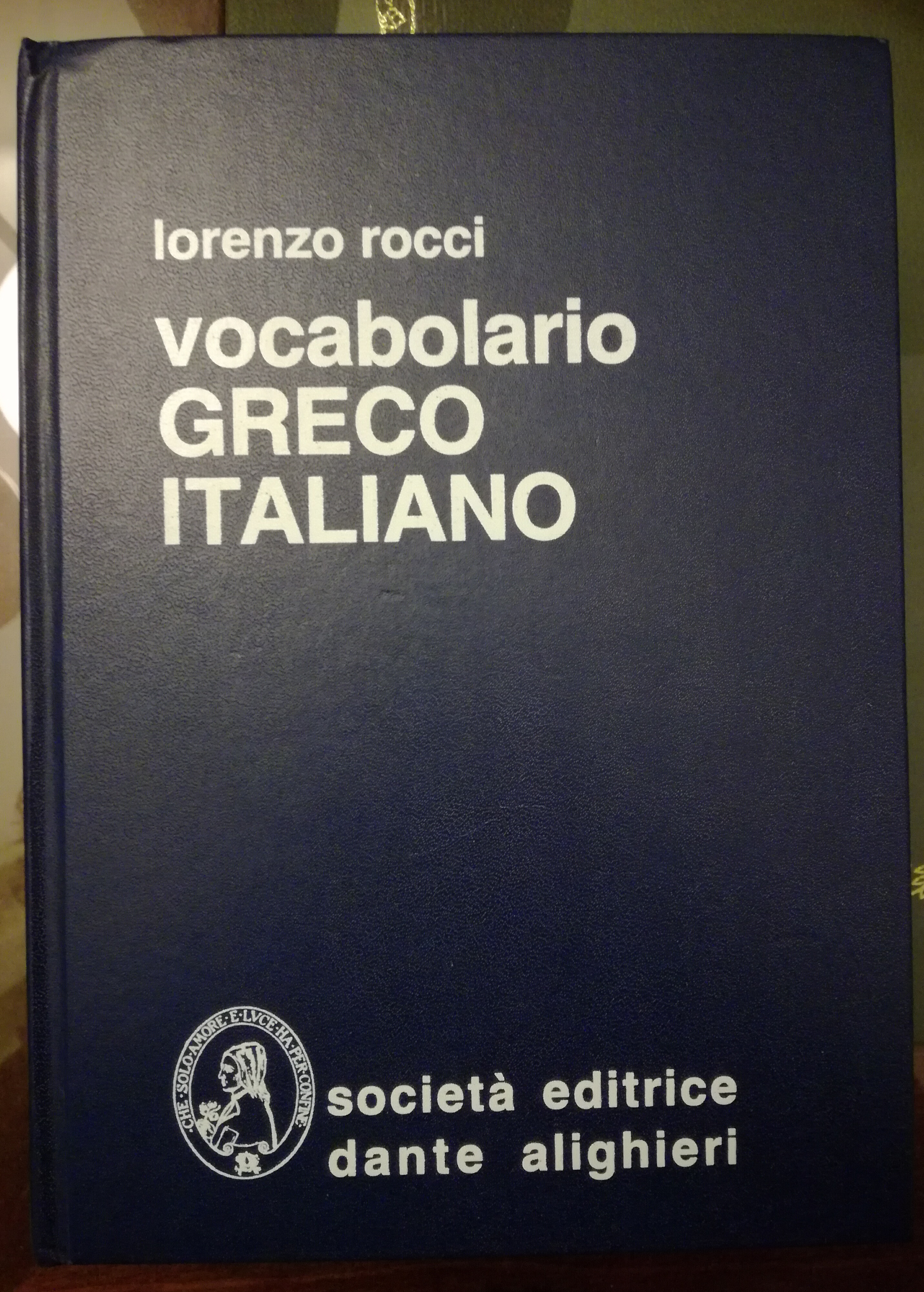
A well-known Ancient Greek dictionary, extensively used in liceo classico Italian schools since 1939 and still in use

Ancient Greek language is still taught in some parts of the world. Examples of the very few countries where Ancient Greek is still a very popular subject are Italy, Belgium and the Netherlands. Ancient Greek is usually treated as a written language in formal instruction.

== Curriculum requirements ==
=== Italy ===
In Italy, Ancient Greek is a compulsory subject only in liceo classico. Students of other Italian schools aren't required to study Ancient Greek. Since 6.7% of Italian high school students are in liceo classico, it can be concluded that about 6.7% of Italian students actually study Ancient Greek.

In liceo classico, Ancient Greek courses last for the whole high school 5-year study period, and, together with Latin it takes up a significant amount of time and effort for students. In the first two years of high school, students study, among other things, the grammar of both Latin and Ancient Greek; while the remaining three years are mostly devoted to Latin literature and Ancient Greek literature.

In Italy, Ancient Greek and Latin are deemed to be highly educative for students. Those languages are believed to provide a successful study method and to "open one's mind" (Italian: aprire la mente), meaning to make students more skilled and willing to study, and also to significantly improve language skills, and it is deemed to improve the student's skills not only in the field of humanities, but in any field. Students who study Ancient Greek and Latin are said to perform better than other students both at university and in their career, but there is no conclusive statistical evidence for it. Italian liceo classico students are required to translate short texts from Ancient Greek (the so-called Italian: versione di greco) and Latin almost on a daily basis, and it takes up a considerable amount of the time spent by students for homework.

In Italy, the compulsory study of Ancient Greek have been both praised and criticized. It has been suggested that Italian schooling system should be revised to meet international modern education standards, but very little has changed inside Italian schools when the study of Ancient Greek and Latin are considered.

Italian physicist Guido Tonelli also attended liceo classico high school, and he said that the translation of short texts from Ancient Greek and Latin is comparable to "scientific research"; it's also supposed to be a useful mental exercise.

=== United States ===
Instruction in Ancient Greek at secondary school level is exceedingly rare in the United States. Several prestigious college-preparatory schools, mainly in the Northeast, continue to offer Ancient Greek as a classical language, often alongside Latin. Schools where Ancient Greek is currently taught include Philips Academy, Philips Exeter Academy, Deerfield Academy, Groton School, Boston University Academy, Milton Academy, St. Paul's School (New Hampshire), Rye Country Day School, Hackley School, Trinity School (New York City), Collegiate School (New York), The Roxbury Latin School, Fordham Preparatory School, Middlesex School and Georgetown Preparatory School.

A study conducted in 2000 ascertained that 67 private schools taught Ancient Greek, while 13 public high schools also offered the language. Unlike Latin, it is nearly impossible to determine how many students are enrolled in advanced Greek classes and participate in standardized testing for the subject, as the College Board does not offer a curriculum for an Advanced Placement Ancient Greek course.

== See also ==
- Instruction in Latin
