= Instruction in Latin =

Subject, mostly in schools

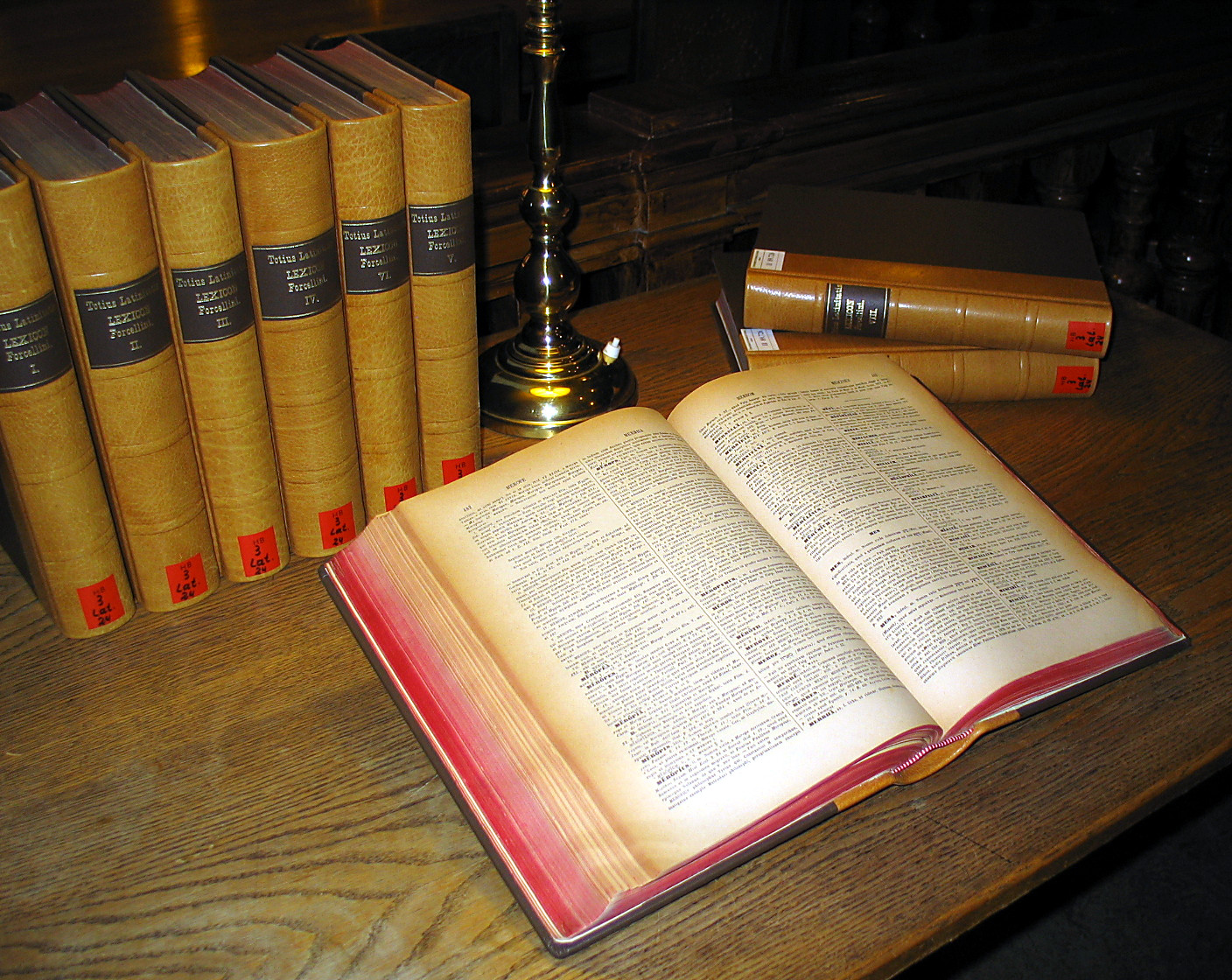
A multi-volume Latin dictionary in the University Library of Graz

The Latin language is still taught in many parts of the world. In many countries it is offered as an optional subject in some secondary schools and universities, and may be compulsory for students in certain institutions or following certain courses.

For the most part, the language is treated as a written language in formal instruction; however, the Living Latin movement advocates teaching it also through speaking and listening.

== Philosophical aims ==
Although Latin was once the universal academic language in Europe, academics no longer use it for writing papers or daily discourse. Furthermore, the Roman Catholic Church, as part of the Vatican II reforms in the 1960s, modernized its religious liturgies to allow less use of Latin and more use of vernacular languages. Nonetheless, the study of Latin has remained an academic staple into the 21st century.

Most of the Latin courses currently offered in secondary schools and universities are geared toward translating historical texts into modern languages, rather than using Latin for direct oral communication. As such, they primarily treat Latin as a written dead language, although some works of modern literature such as Treasure Island, Robinson Crusoe, Paddington Bear, Winnie the Pooh, The Adventures of Tintin, Asterix, Harry Potter, Le Petit Prince, Max und Moritz, Peter Rabbit, Green Eggs and Ham, and The Cat in the Hat have been translated into Latin in order to promote interest in the language.

=== Living Latin ===
Conversely, proponents of the Living Latin movement believe that Latin can be taught in the same way that modern "living" languages are taught, i.e. by incorporating oral fluency and listening comprehension as well as textual skills. This approach offers speculative and stylistic insight into how ancient authors spoke and incorporated sounds of the language, as patterns in Latin poetry and literature can be difficult to identify without an understanding of the sounds of words.

Institutions offering Living Latin instruction include the Vatican and the University of Kentucky. In Great Britain, the Classical Association encourages this approach, and Latin language books describing the adventures of a mouse called Minimus have been published. The Latinum podcast, teaching conversational Classical Latin, is also broadcast from London. There are several websites offering Nuntii Latini (Latin News) which usually cover international matters: in Finland (weekly), in Bremen/Germany (monthly), and on Radio Vatican. In the United States, the National Junior Classical League (with more than 50,000 members) encourages high school students to pursue the study of Latin, and the National Senior Classical League encourages college students to continue their studies of the language.

=== Influence on artificial languages ===
Many international auxiliary languages have been heavily influenced by Latin; the Latin-based constructed language Interlingua considers itself a modernized and simplified version of the language. Latino sine Flexione is a language created from Latin with its inflections dropped, that laid claim to a sizable following in the early 20th century. Esperanto too is based on Latin but indirectly so, using a version of the Latin alphabet and deriving most of its roots from Latin-based Romance languages.

== Curriculum requirements in Australia ==
Latin is not offered by the mainstream curriculum; however it is offered in many high schools as an elective subject. Many schools, particularly private schools, offer many languages in year 7 to expose the student to languages as possible electives; Latin is often among these introductory languages. Alternatively, many universities or colleges offer the subject for students should they desire to study it.

== Curriculum requirements in New Zealand ==
Latin is offered by the mainstream curriculum under NZCEA (New Zealand National Certificate of Educational Achievement). They offer several years of government supported instruction. However, not all schools teach Latin as it is an optional subject. Auckland Grammar School (AGS), is one of the last public schools requiring higher achieving students to take Latin instruction in their first year of study. Latin is also available for study in tertiary education at several universities.

In 2020 there was debate over the proposed removal of government support for the Latin curriculum.

== Curriculum requirements in Europe ==
=== Belgium ===
==== Dutch-speaking regions ====
Latin is optionally taught. Most students can choose Latin as one of the two majors. Other majors may be Ancient Greek, maths, science, humane sciences or modern languages. Almost one third of "ASO" students learn Latin for a number of years.

==== Francophone regions ====
Latin is optionally taught in secondary schools.

=== Croatia ===
Studied in some General and Scientific Gymnasiums for 2 or 4 years, while in Classical Gymnasiums it is studied together with ancient Greek for 4 years, it is a 2 period per week subject in most schools, but there are often many options for extracurricular activities and competitions involving Latin for students that take interest. For a 2-year education in Latin, the curriculum consists of translating short texts, learning declension of nouns, conjugation of verbs, studying tenses, learning "dicta et sententiae" - important or wise quotes said by people in the past or just useful or important phrases with some historic significance, learning Roman history and learning roman numerals together with their respective Latin names and declension patterns, for a 4-year education, most of these curriculums are lengthened and more thorough. Most students in Scientific Gymnasiums argue that there is no place for studying Latin in schools that focus on physics, math and science, especially when that Latin education is purely classical and has little to do with scientific fields those students wish to study in. In Croatia Latin has traces back to the 9th century, while it was also used much earlier since Croatia was part of the Roman Empire. Latin has since stopped being used in churches and courts in the 19th century, while it still plays a large role in medicine.

=== France ===
Latin is optionally studied in French secondary schools. Roughly 9% of pupils studied some Latin in 2023, that is 375 000 children.

=== Germany ===
In Germany, Latin is a choice for the compulsory second language at the Gymnasium (main secondary school preparing for university entry), usually together with French and sometimes Spanish, Russian etc. Nearly one third of students at the Gymnasium learn Latin for a number of years, and a Latin certificate ("Latinum") is a requirement for various university courses. It is the third most popular language learnt in school after English and French, ahead of Spanish or Russian. In some regions, especially majority-Catholic ones such as Bavaria, it is still very popular, to the point that more than 40% of all grammar school students study Latin. However, in Eastern Germany where educational traditions were broken during the communist period, it does not command much popularity.

=== Greece ===
The teaching of Latin has a very long history in Greece. Latin is today compulsory for high school students who wish to study law, social and political sciences and humanities, and is one of the four subjects tested in Greek examinations for entry into university-level courses in these fields. In high school, the subject is taught in a very detailed manner that has provoked criticisms.

=== Ireland ===
Latin until recently was quite popular in secondary schools. Latin is now not widely taught, but can be taken as an optional subject in some secondary schools.

=== Italy ===
In Italy, Latin is compulsory in Liceo Classico secondary schools and optional in Liceo Scientifico. In liceo classico, which is the school that was historically attended by the ruling class, Ancient Greek is a compulsory subject too. Italian high schools other than liceo classico and liceo scientifico normally do not include the subjects Latin and Ancient Greek. About one third of Italian high school graduates (19-year-olds) have taken Latin for five years. Latin is also taught at the Accademia Vivarium Novum.

Around 40 percent of Italian high school students study Latin at high school for five years. Latin courses comprises a quite high number of weekly periods, and this contributes to make Italian schooling system somewhat different from other countries', where far fewer students decides to take Latin courses at high school. In Italy, Latin and Ancient Greek are considered important because they are believed to help the students learn an effective study method. In Italy, it is also believed to "open the students' minds" (as people say) i.e., to make them more skilled and more intelligent, though there is no conclusive statistical evidence for this. Words often overlap between Latin, Italian, and sometimes English, and it is believed that students of Latin have a wider vocabulary in the fields of science, literature, law, philosophy, and also in foreign language (Spanish, French, Portuguese, English, Romanian). However some contend that Latin and Ancient Greek courses reduce the time in a given week for other important studies.

Latin and Ancient Greek courses at high school comprise both grammar and literature. Grammar is normally analysis of the text given, and this, among other things, is supposed to improve the students' language skills. Inside liceo classico and liceo scientifico, the translation of short texts from Latin and Ancient Greek is among the most complex homework given to students in the first two years of high school. Literature is studied in the remaining three years. Students are also regularly assigned homework consisting of translating short texts from Latin and Ancient Greek (in Italian, they are called versione di latino and versione di greco respectively). Students are taught to carry out a translation assignment following a strict semantic analysis.

The translation of short texts from Latin and Ancient Greek has been compared by Italian physicist Guido Tonelli to "scientific research" and it is said to be a useful mental exercise.

Italian schooling system has received both praises and criticism. It has also been suggested that it should be revised to meet the needs of the contemporary era, mainly because it is very different from other successful schooling systems, such as those of Finland and the United States. Despite the efforts of Italian politicians to reform it, very little changed when it comes to Latin and Ancient Greek.

Inside Italian schools, the pronunciation adopted by teachers is normally that of Neo-Latin.

=== Netherlands ===
In the Netherlands, learning either Latin or Ancient Greek is compulsory at the highest variant of secondary education, the gymnasium – both languages for at least the first three years. After that, the pupils can choose either to keep only Latin, or to keep only Greek, or to keep both classical languages in their curriculum for three more years.

=== Poland ===
Latin is a non-compulsory foreign language that students of some high schools can choose to learn. Latin language and the culture of antiquity is also one of the extra examinations a high school graduate may take during their matura. Latin language is a compulsory subject for students of law, history, medicine, veterinary and language studies.

=== Romania ===
Latin is a compulsory subject in 7th grade. Latin is also taught in high school, but only at humanities specialisations and theological seminaries. Students studying social sciences are taught latin in grades 9 and 10, and those specialising on philology study latin in all four years of highschool. Also, latin is a subject (usually optional) at some faculties, such as theology, law, philosophy and letters (linguistics).

=== Spain ===
Latin is a compulsory subject for all those who study humanities (students can select from three sorts of study: sciences, humanities or a mixture) in grades 11 and 12.

=== Switzerland ===
Since the 1980s when about half of all Gymnasium (grammar school, type of secondary leading to university entry) students had Latin, the language took a deep dip. After modest recovery in the past years about one fifth of all students at the Gymnasium nowadays take some years of Latin. There are regional differences: whereas in few cantons like Uri the language is not being taught any more, in Appenzell, Graubünden und Glarus and Zürich around 40% of Gymnasium students take Latin.

=== United Kingdom ===
In the first half of the 20th century, Latin was taught in approximately 25% of schools. However, from the 1960s, universities gradually began to abandon Latin as an entry requirement for Medicine and Law degrees. After the introduction of the Modern Language General Certificate of Secondary Education in the 1980s, Latin began to be replaced by other languages in many schools. Latin is still taught in a small number, particularly private schools. Three British exam boards offer Latin, OCR, SQA and WJEC. In 2006, it was dropped by the exam board AQA.

At GCSE level, Latin is one of the least studied subjects. In June 2023, there were 2,954 candidates for the WJEC Latin exam. In the same year, 5605 candidates sat the OCR exam.

As of 2007, around 20.4% of secondary schools in the UK offer Latin (966 schools). This is made up of a somewhat even split of 514 state schools and 452 independent schools. 59.9% of independent schools offer Latin compared to only 12.9% of state schools.

=== Other countries ===
In Denmark, Sweden, Iceland, Austria, Hungary, North Macedonia, Slovenia, Croatia, Serbia, Bulgaria, and Romania, Latin is studied at high school level as compulsory or optional subject. In Portugal, Latin is also studied. In Finland, Latin is studied at a small minority of high schools.

== Curriculum requirements in North America ==
=== Canada ===
Latin is occasionally provided in a small number of Canadian secondary schools, usually studied as an elective.

=== United States ===
In the United States, Latin is occasionally taught in high schools and middle schools, usually as an elective or option. There is, however, a growing classical education movement consisting of private schools and home schools that are teaching Latin at the elementary or grammar school level. Latin is often taught in Catholic secondary schools, and in some of them it is a required course. There are two main nation-wide Latin tests in the U.S., the first of which is the Advanced Placement Latin exam. In 2019, 6,083 students took the Advanced Placement Latin exam. For the same exam in 2025, however, the number of test-takers has dropped to 4,336, showing an overall decline in interest of high-level Latin instruction in secondary schools. There is also a National Latin Exam (NLE) administered to students in the U.S. and other countries. More than 149,000 Latin students took the 2007 National Latin Exam. In 2023, the NLE was sat by 98,803 students in 2,848 schools, again supporting the idea that Latin instruction is declining in popularity within the United States.

== Curriculum requirements in South America ==
=== Chile ===
Latin is not a compulsory subject in school, and it is presented as optional in very few secondary schools. However, many universities impart Latin as a compulsory subject for the students of philosophy, Literature, Linguistics, Theology and sometimes Law.

=== Venezuela ===
In Venezuela Latin is taught as a compulsory subject in the branch of humanities of the bachillerato for two years. Bachillerato is a segment of secondary education similar to American high schools and is divided into two branches: sciences and humanities. Students learn Latin grammar in their first year of study, then construct and translate Latin texts in the second year.

At university level, the University of the Andes offers a degree program for Letras Mención Lengua y Literaturas Clásicas (Classical Languages and Literatures). In this program (the only one of its type in Venezuela), the students learn Latin, Ancient Greek and the literature of both languages for five years. In other Venezuelan universities, Latin is a compulsory subject of the program for Letras (Hispanic Literature) and Educación, mención: Castellano y Literatura (Education of Spanish language and Hispanic Literature).

Latin is also taught in Roman Catholic seminaries.

== Curriculum requirements in Asia ==
=== Mainland China and Taiwan ===
Latin was one of the things which were taught by the Jesuits. A school was established by them for this purpose. A diplomatic delegation found a local who composed a letter in fluent Latin.

Fewer than five universities are offering a Latin curriculum in Asia.

As a Catholic university, Fu Jen University is the most important school to offer the Latin curriculum in Taiwan. It offers short-term Latin courses with a dormitory in summer vacation and even attracts many students from mainland China.

In China many universities offer Latin courses. At Beijing Foreign Studies University since 2009 there is a Centre for Latin Studies called Latinitas Sinica.

== See also ==
- Instruction in Ancient Greek
