= Robert Allen (lexicographer) =

British lexicographer (born 1944)

Robert E. Allen (born 1944) is a British lexicographer who has written, edited, and published a wide range of books about the English language. He was formerly a senior editor for the Oxford English Dictionary who became a freelance writer and consultant in 1996.

His works include a new edition of the Concise Oxford Dictionary, and a revision of Modern English Usage.

== See also ==
- Penguin English Dictionary
