= Barbara Newhall Follett =

American author (born 1914, disappeared 1939)

- Born: March 4, 1914; Hanover, New Hampshire, U.S.
- Disappeared: December 7, 1939 (aged 25); Brookline, Massachusetts, U.S.
- Died: Unknown
- Other names: Barbara Rogers
- Occupation: Novelist
- Notable work: The House Without Windows (1927); The Voyage of the Norman D. (1928)
- Spouse: Nickerson Rogers (m. 1934)
- Father: Wilson Follett

Barbara Newhall Follett (March 4, 1914 – disappeared December 7, 1939) was an American child prodigy novelist. Her first novel, The House Without Windows, was published in January 1927, when she was twelve years old. Her next novel, The Voyage of the Norman D., received critical acclaim when she was fourteen.

In December 1939, aged 25, Follett reportedly became depressed with her marriage and walked out of her apartment, never to be seen again.

== Early life ==
Barbara Newhall Follett was born in Hanover, New Hampshire, on March 4, 1914, to Wilson Follett, a literary editor, critic and university lecturer, and former schoolteacher Helen Thomas Follett. She had an elder half-sister, named Grace, from her father's first marriage, as well as a younger sister, Sabra Follett, later Sabra Follett Meservey — the first woman to be admitted as a graduate student to Princeton University, in 1961. Schooled at home by her mother, Barbara showed an early aptitude for reading and writing, as she began to write her own poetry by the age of four. Barbara was an imaginative and intelligent child: by age seven, she had begun to put to paper her own imaginary world, Farksolia, and to develop its language, Farksoo. Somewhat a child of nature, Barbara's stories and poems often dealt with the natural world and the wilderness.

== Career ==
In 1923, when Follett was only eight years old, she began writing The Adventures of Eepersip, later titled The House Without Windows, as a birthday present for her mother using a small portable typewriter she had been given. The story concerned a young girl, named Eepersip, who runs away from home and family to live happily in nature, complete with animal friends. Though later that year her manuscript burned in a house fire, Follett rewrote the entire story and her father, an editor at the Knopf publishing house, supervised its publication in 1927. With the help and guidance of Follett's father, The House Without Windows was accepted and published in 1927 by Knopf to critical acclaim by The New York Times, the Saturday Review, and H. L. Mencken. Due to this early success, Barbara was hailed by some as a child genius. Her opinion was sought out by radio stations and she was asked to review other children's books, such as Now We Are Six by British author A. A. Milne.

Follett's next book, The Voyage of the Norman D., recounted her June 1927 journey on a coastal lumber schooner from New Haven to Nova Scotia. It was published a year later in 1928, also receiving critical acclaim in many literary publications.

However, in the same year, Follett's father abandoned her mother for another woman. The event was a devastating blow to Follett, who was deeply attached to her father. Aged 14, she had reached the apex of her literary career.

My dreams are going through their death flurries. They are dying before the steel javelins and arrows of a world of Time and Money.

Subsequently, her family fell upon hard times. By the age of 16, as the Great Depression was deepening, Follett was working as a secretary in New York City. She wrote several more manuscripts, including the novel Lost Island and Travels Without a Donkey, which described a walking and canoeing trip from northern Maine to the Massachusetts border.

== Marriage ==
In mid-1931, Follett met Nickerson Rogers. The couple spent the northern summer of 1932 walking the Appalachian Trail from Katahdin to the Massachusetts border, then sailed to Spain where they continued their walking excursions in Mallorca and through the Swiss Alps. After settling in Brookline, Massachusetts, the couple married in July 1934. At this time, Barbara still wrote, but her work was no longer in favor with publishers. Although initially happy, by 1937 Barbara had started expressing dissatisfaction concerning married life in her letters to close friends, and by 1938 these cracks had widened even further. Follett soon came to believe that Rogers was being unfaithful to her and became depressed.

== Disappearance ==
According to her husband, on December 7, 1939, Follett left their apartment after a quarrel with $30 in her pocket (equivalent to $678 in 2024). She was never seen again.

Rogers did not report Follett's disappearance to police for two weeks, claiming that he was waiting for her to return. Four months after notifying police, he requested a missing persons bulletin be issued. As the bulletin was issued under Follett's married name of "Rogers", it went unnoticed by the media.

In 1952, 13 years after Follett disappeared, her mother Helen began insisting that Brookline Police investigate the matter more thoroughly. Helen had become suspicious of Rogers after she discovered that he had made little effort to find his wife. In a letter to Rogers, she wrote: "All of this silence on your part looks as if you had something to hide concerning Barbara's disappearance ... You cannot believe that I shall sit idle during my last few years and not make whatever effort I can to find out whether Bar is alive or dead, whether, perhaps, she is in some institution suffering from amnesia or nervous breakdown."

In May 1966, Follett's disappearance received attention upon the publication of Barbara, a collection of Follett's writings compiled by Harold Grier McCurdy in collaboration with Follett's mother.

Follett's body was never found, and law enforcement did not find evidence either indicating or excluding foul play. The date and circumstances of her death were not established.

=== Later developments ===
In 2019, writer Daniel Mills published a theory that Follett's body was found but not identified correctly. After investigating multiple missing persons cases, Mills claimed to have found evidence that the body of Follett was discovered in November 1948, but was misidentified as another missing individual, Elsie Whittemore, who had disappeared in June 1936. Mills explained that the body was found on Pulsifer Hill in Holderness, New Hampshire, one-half mile (0.80 km) from a farmhouse where Follett and Rogers had a long-standing rental agreement. The possessions found with the body were consistent with Follett's belongings. However, local police were unaware of her disappearance and had no record of it. The cause of death was determined to be suicide, as a bottle containing barbiturate residue was found at the scene—a substance Follett was known to have taken following her return to Boston in August, 1939.

== Bibliography ==
- The House Without Windows & Eepersip's Life There. New York and London: Knopf 1927. OCLC 870940 (Reprinted 1968, New York: Avon Camelot.) (Reprinted 2019, London: Hamish Hamilton OCLC 1112384789)
- The Voyage of the Norman D. as told by the Cabin-boy. New York and London: Knopf 1928. OCLC 3561118 (Republished 2024, Farksolia. Includes a new Afterword by Stefan Cooke and "Notes on a Junior Author" by Wilson Follett ISBN 9780996243179
- Lost Island (Plus Three Stories and an Afterword). Farksolia 2020 ISBN 9780996243148

== See also ==
- List of people who disappeared mysteriously: 1910–1990
