= Pam Peters =

Pamela Hardy Peters FAHA (born 28 March 1942) is an Australian linguist and an Emeritus Professor of Linguistics at Macquarie University, Sydney. She is a member of the Australian Broadcasting Corporation's Standing Committee on Spoken English and has published several books on Australian and international English usage, including The Cambridge Guide to English Usage (2004) and The Cambridge Guide to Australian English Usage (2007). Peters was a member of the editorial committee of the Macquarie Dictionary. In 2012, she was elected a Fellow of the Australian Academy of the Humanities.

== Bibliography ==
=== As author ===
- The Cambridge Australian English Style Guide (1995)
- The Cambridge Guide to English Usage (2004)
- The Cambridge Guide to Australian English Usage (2007)
- The Cambridge Dictionary of English Grammar (2013)

=== As editor ===
- From the Southern Hemisphere: Parameters of Language Variation (with Louise de Beuzeville) (2010)
