= Penguin English Dictionary =

British English dictionary

The Penguin English Dictionary, variously known as The New Penguin English Dictionary or The Penguin Complete English Dictionary, is a one-volume English-language dictionary published by Penguin Books, first published in 1965. The Penguin English Dictionary is currently in its third edition, and its chief editor is Robert Allen. The specialist contributors and advisers involve writers for books, newspapers, magazines etc.

The 1965 edition of the Penguin English Dictionary has been noted for including terms before counterparts. It was the first dictionary to published the word "fuck", following the relaxation of obscenity laws in the United Kingdom. Given this inclusion, Knute Skinner penned a poem titled "The Penguin English Dictionary," which highlights how children use dictionaries to learn "dirty words". A review of the 1966 edition of the Oxford English Dictionary (OED) noted that the Penguin English Dictionary contained more scientific terms than the OED, citing astronaut as an example. Also referring to the OED, R. W. Burchfield questioned whether the way the inaugural Penguin English Dictionary organized definitions by usage was preferred over how the OED organized them. Burchfield also critiqued how the dictionary reduced etymologies to include more modern words.

The 1985 edition of The Penguin English Dictionary added pronunciations of words using the International Phonetic Alphabet (IPA), as did the 1985 edition of the OED. Unlike the OED, The Penguin English Dictionary included phonetics originally included in the Longman Dictionary of Contemporary English, such as symbols that "show variability" of pronunciation and two-story symbols.

== Publication history ==
- Garmonsway, G. N.; Simpson, Jacqueline, eds. (1965). The Penguin English Dictionary. Penguin Books. ISBN 978-0-14-051029-4.
- The Penguin English Dictionary (1985-86 ed.). Penguin Books. 1985. ISBN 978-0-140-51139-0.
- Allen, Robert E., ed. (2004). The Penguin English Dictionary (2nd ed.). London: Penguin Books. ISBN 978-0-14-051533-6.
- Allen, Robert, ed. (2006). The Penguin Complete English Dictionary. Penguin. ISBN 978-0-14-051583-1.
- Allen, R. E., ed. (2007). The Penguin English Dictionary (3rd ed.). Penguin. ISBN 978-0-14-051592-3.
