= The Cambridge Guide to English Usage =

Usage dictionary

The Cambridge Guide to English Usage by Pam Peters is a usage dictionary, giving an up-to-date account of the debatable issues of English usage and written style. It is based on extensive, up-to-date corpus data rather than on the author's personal intuition or prejudice, and differentiates among US, UK, Canadian and Australian usages. British lexicographer Sidney Landau remarked:

The Cambridge Guide to English Usage is unique in the extent of its coverage of all the major varieties of English and in the degree to which it is based on corpus evidence, that is, on the analysis of vast collections of actual written and spoken language in each of the varieties under study.

== See also ==
- A Dictionary of Modern English Usage by Fowler
- List of English words with disputed usage
