= Wilson Follett =

American writer

- Born: Roy Wilson Follett; March 21, 1887; North Attleboro, Massachusetts
- Died: January 7, 1963 (aged 75)
- Occupation: Writer
- Children: Barbara Newhall Follett

"The modern novel: study of the purpose and the meaning of fiction" by Follett

Roy Wilson Follett (March 21, 1887 – January 7, 1963) was an American writer known for writing the draft form of what became Follett's Modern American Usage, which was unfinished at his death. The book was completed and edited by his friend Jacques Barzun (in collaboration with six other people who helped with the editing) and published posthumously.

== Early life ==
Follett was born Roy Wilson Follett in North Attleboro, Massachusetts on March 21, 1887. He graduated from Harvard College in 1909, with an BA in English.

== Career ==
Follett taught English at Texas Agricultural & Mechanical College, Dartmouth College, and finally, Brown University. He left teaching in 1918, when he decided to pursue writing full-time instead.

Follett then worked in publishing, first at Yale University Press and later Alfred A. Knopf. In the 1940s, he wrote essays for The Atlantic.

In 1921, he was one of the dedicatees of James Branch Cabell's novel Figures of Earth. He also edited The Work of Stephen Crane in twelve volumes (1925–27), the first collected edition of Crane's writings. His novel No More Sea came in third in the voting for the 1934 Pulitzer Prize for fiction.

== Personal life ==
Follett's wife, Helen, was also a writer. In 1914, the couple had a daughter, Barbara Newhall Follett, who was a child prodigy author and published her first novel at the age of 12. In 1928, Follett abandoned his wife and Barbara for a younger woman, Margaret Whipple, whom he had met at work.

In 1939, at the age of 25, Barbara disappeared. In 1941, Follett published an essay asking Barbara to contact him in The Atlantic entitled "To a Daughter, One Year Lost: From Her Father".

== In popular culture ==
- Follett's daughter Barbara and Follett himself are featured in the novel "The Story She Left Behind" by novelist Patti Callahan Henry
