= Robert Burchfield =

New Zealand-born editor of the Oxford English Dictionary

Robert William Burchfield CNZM, CBE (27 January 1923 – 5 July 2004) was a lexicographer, scholar, and writer, who edited the Oxford English Dictionary for thirty years to 1986, and was chief editor from 1971.

== Education and career ==
Born in Whanganui, New Zealand, he studied at Wanganui Technical College and Victoria University in Wellington. After war service in the Royal Regiment of New Zealand Artillery, he graduated MA from Wellington in 1948 and won a Rhodes Scholarship to Magdalen College, Oxford University, in England, where he was tutored by C. S. Lewis. He became a Fellow of Magdalen and lecturer in English straight after graduating (1952–53), subsequently moving colleges to Christ Church (1953–57) and St Peter's (1955–79). Through C. T. Onions, the Magdalen librarian, Burchfield assisted in editing one of Onions's projects, the Oxford Dictionary of English Etymology. His preparation of an edition of the Ormulum was supervised by J. R. R. Tolkien.

Onions recommended him to Dan Davin as editor of the second Supplement to the Oxford English Dictionary, on which he worked from 1957 to 1986. He re-established the network of volunteer readers sending in records of words that had helped to create the original OED but had been allowed to fall away. In 2004, it emerged that Burchfield's second supplement had removed a large number of words that were present in the earlier 1933 supplement edited by Onions and William Craigie, which Burchfield's second supplement incorporated. Four years later the full nature of his treatment of foreign words was shown: he deleted 17 per cent of the foreign loan words and words from regional forms of English; and his coverage was not as extensive as his predecessors, especially Onions, who included 45 per cent more loanwords and World Englishes. In 2012, a book documented Burchfield's work and showed that many of the omitted words had only a single recorded usage, but their removal ran against both what was thought to be the established OED editorial practice and a perception that he had opened up the dictionary to "World English". The author of the book concerned, Sarah Ogilvie, complained that people were unfairly judging Burchfield and that her coverage had been misleadingly reported in the media.

Burchfield also participated in a 1980s BBC committee that monitored compliance with the broadcaster's policy of using received pronunciation in newscasting, before that policy was abandoned in 1989 in favor of "using announcers and newsreaders with a more representative range of accents."

In 1994 the Hamburg-based Alfred Toepfer Foundation awarded Burchfield its annual Shakespeare Prize in recognition of his life's work.

In retirement, he produced a controversial new edition, substantially rewritten and less prescriptivist, of Fowler's Modern English Usage, the long-established style guide by Henry Watson Fowler.

He lived for many years in Sutton Courtenay, previously in Berkshire, now in Oxfordshire. He died in Abingdon-on-Thames at 81, in 2004. He married twice and had three children.

== Selected works ==
- Supplement to the Oxford English Dictionary, 4 vols, 1972–1986
- The Spoken Word, 1981
- The English Language, 1985
- Studies in Lexicography, 1987
- Unlocking the English Language, 1989
- The Cambridge History of the English Language, Vol. 5: English in Britain and Overseas, 1994
- Editor, The New Fowler's Modern English Usage, 3rd Edition, 1996
