= Francis George Fowler =

British writer and grammarian (1871–1918)

Francis George Fowler (1871–1918) was an English writer on English language, grammar and usage.

Born in Tunbridge Wells, Fowler was educated at Peterhouse, Cambridge. He lived on Guernsey in the Channel Islands. He and his older brother, Henry Watson Fowler, wrote The King's English together, an influential book published in 1906. Later they worked on what became Fowler's Modern English Usage, but before it was finished, Francis died of tuberculosis, picked up during his service with the British Expeditionary Force in World War I. He was 47 years old.

Henry dedicated Modern English Usage to Francis, writing, "he had a nimbler wit, a better sense of proportion, and a more open mind, than his twelve-year-older partner."
