= Michael Swan (writer) =

English writer and poet

Michael Swan is a writer of English language teaching and reference materials. He graduated from University of Oxford with a bachelor's degree in modern foreign languages and has later gone for a postgraduate research degree. He is the founder of Swan School of English.

== Biography ==
Major publications include Practical English Usage and Basic English Usage (Oxford University Press). Other books are Grammar, an introductory book on why languages need grammar and what they do with it and, with David Baker, Grammar Scan (Oxford University Press), a collection of diagnostic language tests.

Michael Swan is also the co-author, with Catherine Walter, of The Oxford English Grammar Course, of How English Works and The Good Grammar Book (all with Oxford University Press), and the New Cambridge English Course series (with Cambridge University Press). In 2012 the Advanced level of the Oxford English Grammar Course won the newly established Award in English Language Teaching (ELT) Writing, conferred by the British Council in collaboration with The (UK) Society of Authors.

Michael Swan's interests include pedagogic grammar, mother-tongue influence in second language acquisition, and the relationship between applied linguistic theory and classroom language-teaching practice. He has written articles on all these topics, and is known for influential articles on the communicative approach and on task-based learning.

Michael Swan is also a widely published poet. His poems have been published in several poetry magazines such as Acumen and The Frogmore Papers, as well as in the BBC Wildlife magazine. His collection When They Come For You was published by The Frogmore Press in 2003, and his second collection The Shapes of Things was published by Oversteps Books in 2011. In 2005 he won The Times' Stephen Spender Prize for poetry translation with his translation from the German of a section of Rilke's "Orpheus. Eurydice. Hermes". He won The Poetry Society's 2010 Stanza Poetry Competition, with his poem "I Wasn't There".
