= The King's English =

1906 book by Henry Watson Fowler and Francis George Fowler

- Title page of the second edition; click to access a PDF
- Author: Henry Watson Fowler; Francis George Fowler
- Language: English
- Genre: Reference
- Publisher: Oxford: At the Clarendon Press
- Publication date: 1906
- Publication place: United Kingdom
- Text: The King's English at Wikisource

The King's English is a book on English usage and grammar. It was written by the brothers Henry Watson Fowler and Francis George Fowler and published in 1906; it thus predates by twenty years Modern English Usage, which was written by Henry alone after Francis's death in 1918.

The King's English is less like a dictionary than Modern English Usage: it consists of longer articles on more general topics, such as vocabulary, syntax, and punctuation and draws heavily on examples from many sources throughout. One of its sections is a systematic description of the appropriate uses of shall and will. The third and last edition was published in 1931, by which time Modern English Usage had superseded it in popularity.

Because all living languages continually evolve, the book is now considered outdated in some respects, and some of the Fowlers' opinions about correct English usage are at times seen as antiquated (yet not incorrect) with regard to contemporary standards. For example, the Fowlers disapprove of the word "concision" on the grounds that it had a technical meaning in theology, "to which it may well be left"; but "concision" is now a common synonym for "conciseness". The Fowlers also criticised the use of standpoint and just how much (as in "Just how much more of this can we take?"), describing them as undesirable "Americanisms", but both are now common in British English. The book nevertheless remains a benchmark for usage and is still in print.

The Queen's English is a book of the same kind by Harry Blamires published in 1994 and reissued as Correcting your English in 1996.

== See also ==
- Hart's Rules
- Received Pronunciation
