= A Dictionary of Modern English Usage =

Style guide by Henry Watson Fowler

- The title page; click to access a PDF
- Author: H. W. Fowler
- Language: English
- Published: 1926
- Publisher: Oxford University Press
- Publication place: United Kingdom
- OCLC: 815620926

A Dictionary of Modern English Usage (1926), by H. W. Fowler (1858–1933), is a dictionary of usage of modern English. It details the usage of selected words, morphemes, phrases, word classes, punctuation, and various other rules and word features. The 1926 first edition remains in print along with the 1965 second edition, which was edited by Sir Ernest Gowers and reprinted in 1983 and 1987. The 1996 third edition, titled The New Fowler's Modern English Usage, and revised in 2004, was mostly rewritten by Robert W. Burchfield and incorporated corpus linguistics data. The 2015 fourth edition, titled Fowler's Dictionary of Modern English Usage, was edited by Jeremy Butterfield. Informally readers may refer to the style guide and dictionary as Fowler's Modern English Usage, Fowler or Fowler's.

== Fowler's linguistic approach ==
=== On illogicalities in usage ===
In the entry on only, Fowler says that "illogicalities and inaccuracies of expression tend to be eliminated as the language grows older". However, he argues that this tendency can have "its bad as well as its good effects", and that "pedants" who try to accelerate this process "when the illogicality is only apparent or the inaccuracy of no importance are turning English into an exact science or an automatic machine".

As an example, he compares the position of the adverb only in "He died only a week ago" versus "he only died a week ago". He labels the former the "orthodox placing", and, in defense of the (heterodox) latter, argues that "it is the order that most people have always used and still use, and that, the risk of misunderstanding being chimerical, it is not worthwhile to depart from the natural". He then offers an example in which the case against heterodox placing is stronger: "Mackenzie only seems to go wrong when he lets in yellow; and yellow seems to be still the standing difficulty of the colour printer." Here, because of the ambiguity as to whether only is modifying "seems" or "when he lets in yellow", it should be placed immediately before "when" if that is the intended meaning. Fowler offers the following advice:

There is an orthodox position for the adverb, easily determined in case of need; to choose another position that may spoil or obscure the meaning is bad; but a change of position that has no such effect except technically is not only justified by historical and colloquial usage but often demanded by rhetorical needs.

=== On preposition stranding ===
In the preface to the second edition of Modern English Usage, Ernest Gowers wrote of Fowler as a grammarian: "In one respect he was an iconoclast. There was nothing he enjoyed debunking more than the 'superstitions' and 'fetishes', as he called them, invented by pedagogues for no other apparent purpose than to make writing harder."

Here is Fowler on the "once cherished superstition that prepositions must be kept true to their name and be placed before the word they govern" and not at the end of a sentence:

Those who lay down the universal principle that final prepositions are "inelegant" are unconsciously trying to deprive the English language of a valuable idiomatic resource, which has been used freely by all our greatest writers except those whose instinct for English idiom has been overpowered by notions of correctness derived from Latin standards. The legitimacy of the prepositional ending in literary English must be uncompromisingly maintained; in respect of elegance or inelegance, every example must be judged not by any arbitrary rule, but on its own merits, according to the impression it makes on the feeling of educated English readers.

Fowler believed that, "what grammarians say should be has perhaps less influence on what shall be than even the more modest of them realize; usage evolves itself little disturbed by their likes and dislikes."

== Editions ==
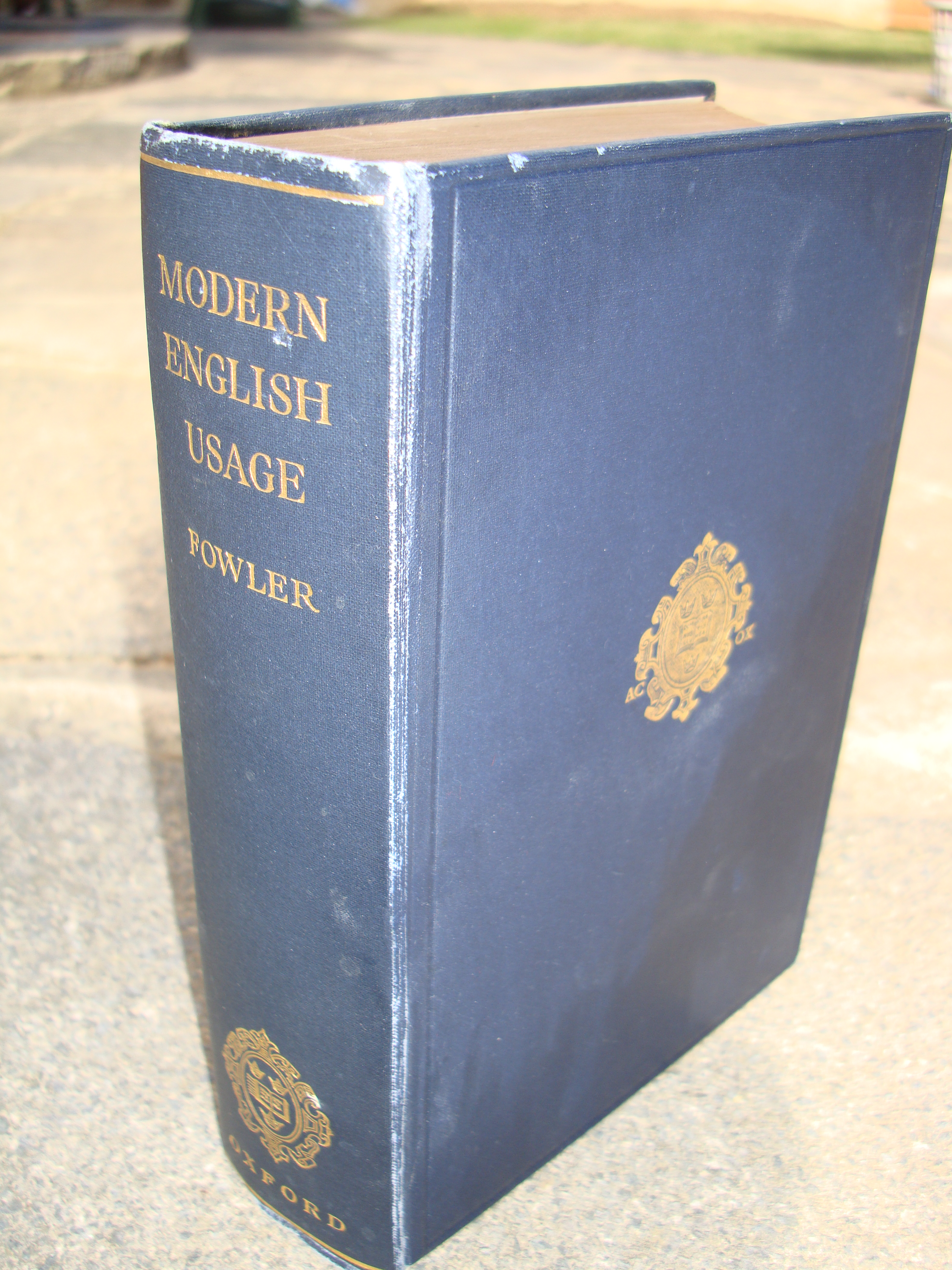
Fowler's Dictionary of Modern English Usage

=== 20th century ===
Before writing A Dictionary of Modern English Usage, Henry W. Fowler and his younger brother, Francis George Fowler (1871–1918), wrote and revised The King's English (1906), a grammar and usage guide. Assisted in the research by Francis, who died in 1918 of tuberculosis contracted (1915–16) whilst serving with the British Expeditionary Force in the First World War (1914–1918), Henry dedicated the first edition of the Dictionary to his late brother:

I think of it as it should have been, with its prolixities docked, its dullnesses enlivened, its fads eliminated, its truths multiplied. He had a nimbler wit, a better sense of proportion, and a more open mind, than his twelve-year-older partner; and it is a matter of regret that we had not, at a certain point, arranged our undertakings otherwise than we did. ... This present book accordingly contains none of his actual writing; but, having been designed in consultation with him, it is the last fruit of a partnership that began in 1903 with our translation of Lucian.

The first edition of the dictionary was published in 1926, and then was reprinted with corrections in 1930, 1937, 1954, and in 2009 with an introduction and commentary by the linguist David Crystal. The second edition, titled Fowler's Modern English Usage, was published in 1965, revised and edited by Ernest Gowers. Gowers largely preserved the original, citing Randolph Quirk's comment on the first edition: "Modern English Usage is personal: it is Fowler".

The third edition, The New Fowler's Modern English Usage, was published in 1996, edited by Robert Burchfield. While Fowler had focused only on British English, Burchfield broadened the dictionary to include American English and English spoken in Australia, Canada, New Zealand, South Africa, and elsewhere.

The Pocket Fowler's Modern English Usage (1999), edited by the lexicographer Robert Allen, is an abridgement of Burchfield's 1996 edition. It was produced by omitting about half the entries and reducing the length of others. A second edition of Allen's Pocket Fowler was published in 2008, the content of which the publisher said "harks back to the original 1926 edition".

=== 21st century ===
The fourth edition, Fowler's Dictionary of Modern English Usage, was published in 2015, edited by Jeremy Butterfield. This edition saw over 250 new entries added to the dictionary. Butterfield made use of the Oxford English Corpus to gather data about the frequency of various spellings, differences in usage of similar words (via word associations), relative frequencies of words in different varieties of English, and malapropisms and misspellings. The World Wide Web facilitated his access to this and other online resources.

On the tension between descriptivism and prescriptivism involved in compiling a usage dictionary, Butterfield points out that while "people have taken it for granted that [Fowler] laid down cast-iron rules to be adhered to absolutely. That belief is far from the truth. He was, paradoxically, both descriptive and prescriptive." Butterfield also says,

This tension between a descriptive and a prescriptive approach is something that any compiler of a modern usage dictionary inevitably feels. … However, like many commentators on usage, to an extent I want to have my cake and eat it, to square the circle of descriptivism and prescriptivism. As a lexicographer and editor I favour the former; as a language-user I have my own preferences, tastes, habits, and bugbears, as all previous editors had. Fowler would not be Fowler without them.

== See also ==
- Disputes in English grammar
- Elegant variation
- False scent

=== Other works on English Usage ===
- The Elements of Style by William Strunk Jr. and E. B. White.
- The Chicago Manual of Style an American English guide to style and publishing markup.
- The Complete Plain Words by Sir Ernest Gowers.
- Practical English Usage by Michael Swan, a grammar for non-native English speakers.
- The Cambridge Guide to English Usage by Pam Peters.
- Merriam Webster's Dictionary of English Usage.
- Garner's Modern English Usage by Bryan A. Garner
- The King's English: A Guide to Modern Usage by Kingsley Amis

== Bibliography ==
=== Editions of the Dictionary ===
- Fowler, Henry Watson (1926). A Dictionary of Modern English Usage (1st ed.). Oxford: Clarendon Press. OCLC 318492.
- Fowler, Henry Watson (1965). Gowers, Ernest (ed.). A Dictionary of Modern English Usage (2nd ed.). Great Britain: Oxford University Press. ISBN 9780198691150. OCLC 318483.
- Burchfield, Robert William, ed. (1996). The New Fowler's Modern English Usage (3rd ed.). Oxford University Press. ISBN 978-0-19-869126-6. OCLC 36063311.
- Burchfield, Robert William, ed. (1998). The New Fowler's Modern English Usage (Revised 3rd ed.). Oxford University Press. ASIN B00EKYQYU2.
- Allen, Robert, ed. (1999). Pocket Fowler's Modern English Usage (1st ed.). Oxford University Press. ISBN 978-0-19-866237-2. OCLC 41660695.
- Allen, Robert, ed. (26 August 2008). Pocket Fowler's Modern English Usage (2nd ed.). Oxford University Press. ISBN 978-0-19-923258-1. OCLC 495194507.
- Fowler, Henry Watson (2009). A Dictionary of Modern English Usage: The Classic First Edition. Introduction and notes by David Crystal. Great Britain: Oxford University Press. ISBN 978-0-19-953534-7.
- Butterfield, Jeremy, ed. (March 2015). Fowler's Dictionary of Modern English Usage (4th ed.). Oxford University Press. ISBN 978-0-19-966135-0.

=== Other works ===
- Fowler, Henry; Winchester, Simon (introduction) (2003 reprint). A Dictionary of Modern English Usage (Oxford Language Classics Series). Oxford Press. ISBN 0-19-860506-4.
- Nicholson, Margaret (1957). A Dictionary of American-English Usage Based on Fowler's Modern English Usage. Signet, by arrangement with Oxford University Press.
- Yagoda, Ben. "Don't Say It Like That: A Legendary Usage Guide is Turning a Hundred". The New Yorker, September 29, 2025, pp. 54–59. Published online as "The Autocrat of English Usage"
