= H. W. Fowler =

British usage writer and lexicographer (1858–1933)

Henry Watson Fowler
- Born: 10 March 1858; Tonbridge, Kent, England
- Died: 26 December 1933 (aged 75); Hinton St George, Somerset, England
- Education: Balliol College, Oxford
- Occupations: Schoolmaster, lexicographer

Henry Watson Fowler (10 March 1858 – 26 December 1933) was an English schoolmaster, lexicographer and commentator on the usage of the English language. He is notable for A Dictionary of Modern English Usage and his work on the Concise Oxford Dictionary, and was described by The Times as "a lexicographical genius".

After an Oxford education, Fowler became a schoolmaster. In middle age, he worked in London as an (unsuccessful) freelance writer and journalist. In partnership with his brother Francis, beginning in 1906, he began publishing seminal grammar, style, and lexicography books. After his brother's death in 1918, he completed the works on which they had collaborated and edited additional works.

== Biography ==
=== Youth and studies ===
Fowler was born on 10 March 1858 in Tonbridge, Kent. His parents, the Rev. Robert Fowler and his wife Caroline, née Watson, were originally from Devon. Robert Fowler was a Cambridge graduate, clergyman and schoolmaster. At the time of Henry's birth he was teaching mathematics at Tonbridge School, but the family soon moved to nearby Tunbridge Wells. Henry was the eldest child of eight, and his father's early death in 1879 left him to assume a leading role in caring for his younger brothers and sister (Charles, Alexander, [Edward] Seymour, Edith, Arthur, Francis and [Herbert] Samuel).

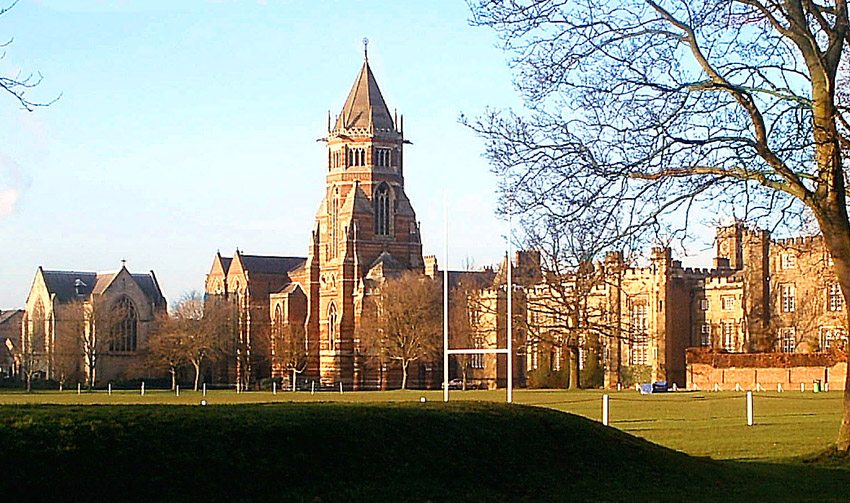
Rugby School, where Fowler studied from 1871 to 1877

Henry Fowler spent some time at a boarding school in Germany before enrolling at Rugby School in 1871. He concentrated on Latin and Greek, winning a school prize for his translation into Greek verse of part of Percy Bysshe Shelley's play Prometheus Unbound. He also took part in drama and debating and in his final year served as head of his house, School House. He was greatly inspired by one of his classics teachers, Robert Whitelaw, with whom he kept up a correspondence later in life.

In 1877 Fowler began attending Balliol College, Oxford. He did not excel at Oxford as he had at Rugby, earning only second-class honours in both Moderations and Literae Humaniores. Although he participated little in Oxford sport, he did begin a practice that he was to continue for the rest of his life: a daily morning run followed by a swim in the nearest body of water. He left Oxford in 1881, but was not awarded a degree until 1886, because he failed to pass his Divinity examination.

=== Teaching ===
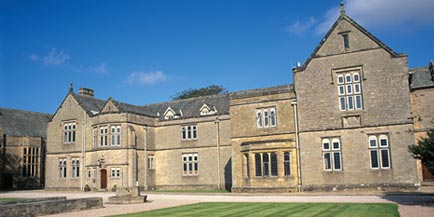
Sedbergh School, where Fowler taught for two decades

Trusting in the judgment of the Balliol College master that he had "a natural aptitude for the profession of Schoolmaster", Fowler took up a temporary teaching position at Fettes College in Edinburgh. After spending two terms there, he moved south again to Yorkshire (present-day Cumbria) to begin a mastership at Sedbergh School in 1882. There he taught Latin, Greek and English, starting with the first form, but soon switching to the sixth form. He was a respected but uninspiring teacher, earning the nickname "Joey Stinker" owing to his propensity for tobacco smoking.

Several of the Fowler brothers were reunited at Sedbergh. Charles Fowler taught temporarily at the school during the illness of one of the house masters. Arthur Fowler had transferred from Rugby to Sedbergh for his last eighteen months at school and later became a master there. Samuel, the troublesome youngest brother, was sent to Sedbergh, probably to be taken care of by Henry and Arthur, but he stayed only a year before leaving the school, and of him nothing further is known. Henry Fowler made several lifelong friends at Sedbergh, who often accompanied him on holiday to the Alps. These included Ralph St John Ainslie, a music teacher and caricaturist; E. P. Lemarchand, whose sister eventually married Arthur Fowler; Bernard Tower, who went on to become headmaster at Lancing; and George Coulton, who was to write the first biography of Henry Fowler.

Despite being the son of a clergyman, Fowler had been an atheist for quite some time, though he rarely spoke of his beliefs in public. He had the chance of becoming a housemaster at Sedbergh on three occasions. The third offer was accompanied by a long discussion with the headmaster, Henry Hart, about the religious requirements for the post, which included preparing the boys for confirmation in the Church of England. This was against Fowler's principles, and when it became clear that no compromise on this matter was possible, he resigned.

=== London ===
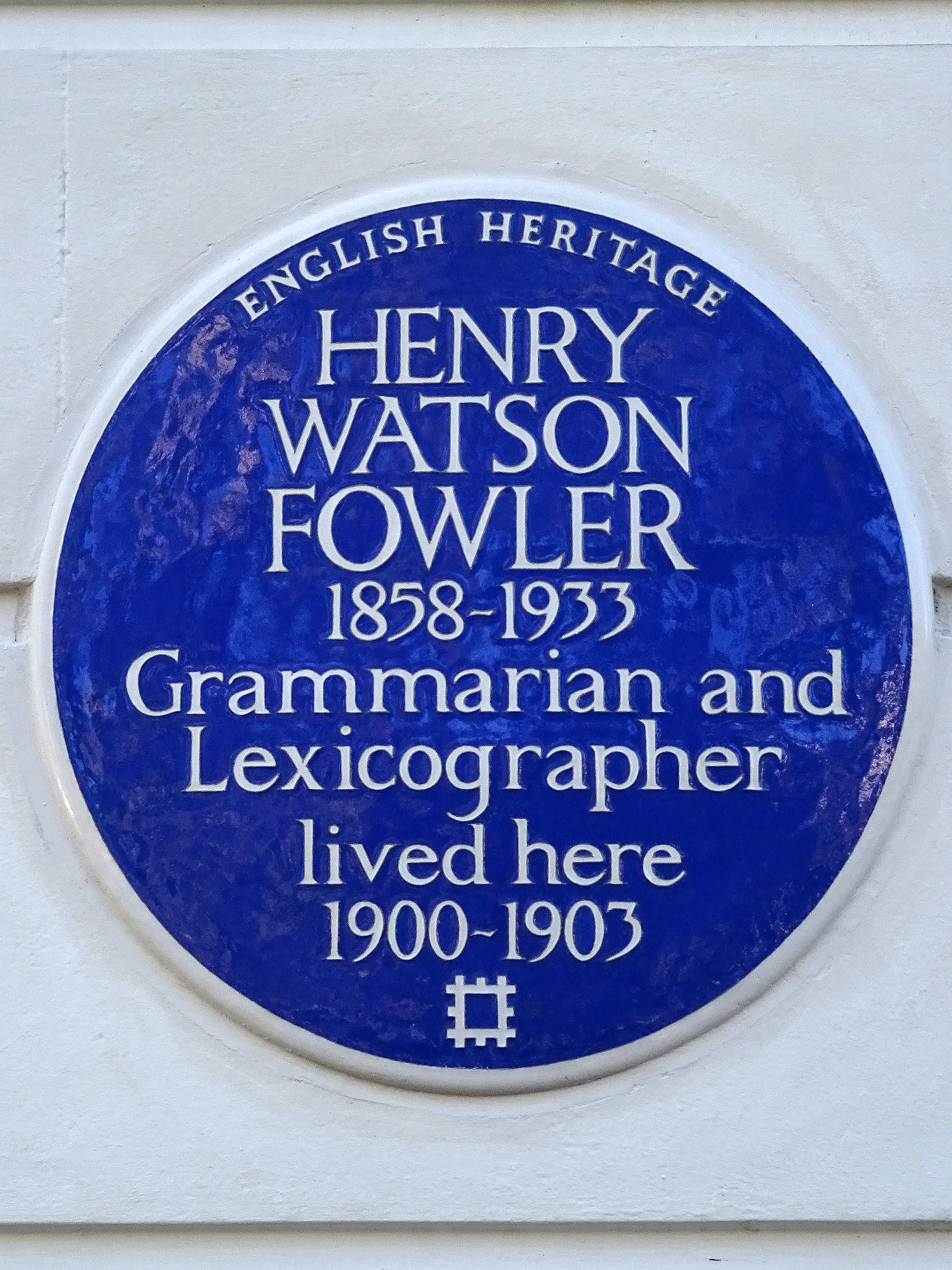
Blue plaque, 14 Paultons Square, Chelsea, London SW3

In the summer of 1899 Fowler moved to a house at 14 Paultons Square, Chelsea, London (where there is now a blue plaque in his honour), and sought work as a freelance writer and journalist, surviving on his meagre writer's earnings and a small inheritance from his father. In his first published article, "Books We Think We Have Read" (1900), he first discusses the habit among Englishmen of pretending a familiarity with certain books—such as the works of Shakespeare or books considered "juvenile"—then proceeds to recommend that the savouring of these books should be "no tossing off of ardent spirits, but the connoisseur's deliberate rolling in the mouth of some old vintage". In "Outdoor London", published a year later in the short-lived Anglo-Saxon Review, Fowler describes the sights and sounds of his new home, praising its plants, its Cockney inhabitants, and its magical night scenes.

=== Writing partnership ===
In 1903, he moved to the island of Guernsey, where he worked with his brother Francis George Fowler. Their first joint project was a translation of the works of Lucian of Samosata. The translation, described by The Times as of "remarkable quality", was taken up by the Oxford University Press and published in four volumes in 1905. Their next work was The King's English (1906), a book meant to encourage writers to be stylistically simple and direct and not to misuse words. This book "took the world by storm".

Fowler collected some of his journalistic articles into volumes and published them pseudonymously, including More Popular Fallacies (1904) by "Quillet", and Si mihi —! (1907) by "Egomet". In 1908, on his fiftieth birthday, he married Jessie Marian Wills (1862–1930). It was an exceptionally happy, but childless, marriage.

The Oxford University Press commissioned from the Fowler brothers a single-volume abridgement of the Oxford English Dictionary (OED), which was published as the Concise Oxford Dictionary in 1911. The Concise Oxford has remained in print ever since, being regularly revised.

The next commission for the brothers was a much smaller, pocket-sized abridgement of the OED at the same time they were working on Modern English Usage; work on both began in 1911, with Henry Fowler concentrating on Modern English Usage and Francis on the pocket dictionary. Neither work was complete at the start of World War I.

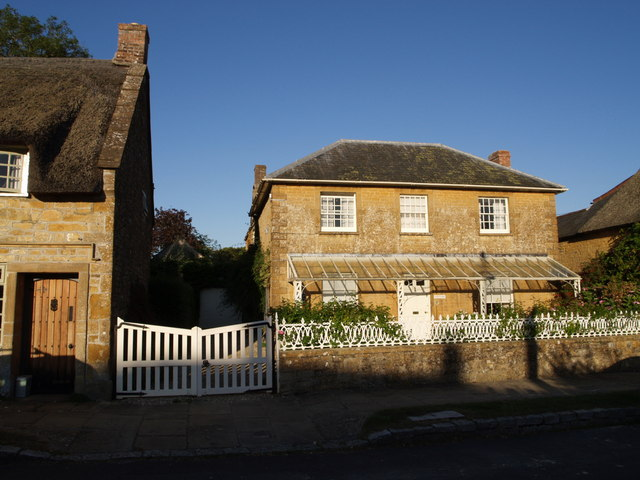
Fowler's house in Hinton St George

In 1914, Fowler and his younger brother volunteered for service in the British army. To gain acceptance, the 56-year-old Henry lied about his age. Both he and Francis were invalided out of the army in 1916 and resumed work on Modern English Usage. In 1918, Francis died aged 47 of tuberculosis, contracted during service with the BEF. After his brother's death, Henry Fowler and his wife moved to Hinton St George in Somerset, where he worked on the Pocket Oxford Dictionary and Modern English Usage, which he dedicated to his brother.

=== Later years ===
A Dictionary of Modern English Usage, published in 1926, considered by many to be the definitive style guide to the English language, "made the name of Fowler a household word in all English-speaking countries". The Times described it as a "fascinating, formidable book". Winston Churchill directed his officials to read it. The success of the book was such that the publishers had to reprint it three times in the first year of publication, and there were twelve further reprints before a second edition was finally commissioned in the 1960s.

On the death of its original editor in 1922, Fowler helped complete the first edition of the Shorter Oxford English Dictionary, under the editorship of C.T. Onions.

In 1929 Fowler republished Si mihi—! under his own name as If Wishes were Horses, and another volume of old journalistic articles under the title Some Comparative Values.

On 26 December 1933, Fowler died at his home, "Sunnyside", Hinton St George, England, aged 75.

== Legacy ==
Currently, The King's English and Modern English Usage remain in print. The latter was updated by Sir Ernest Gowers for the second edition (1965) and largely rewritten by Robert Burchfield for the third (1996). A Pocket edition (ISBN 0-19-860947-7) edited by Robert Allen, based on Burchfield's edition, is available online to subscribers of the Oxford Reference On-line Premium collection.

A biography of Fowler was published in 2001 called The Warden of English. The author was Jenny McMorris (1946–2002), archivist to the Oxford English Dictionary at the Oxford University Press. The Times described the book as "an acclaimed and meticulously researched biography". The Word Man, a play about Fowler's life and career by the writer Chris Harrald, was broadcast on BBC Radio 4's Afternoon Play on 17 January 2008.

== Published works ==
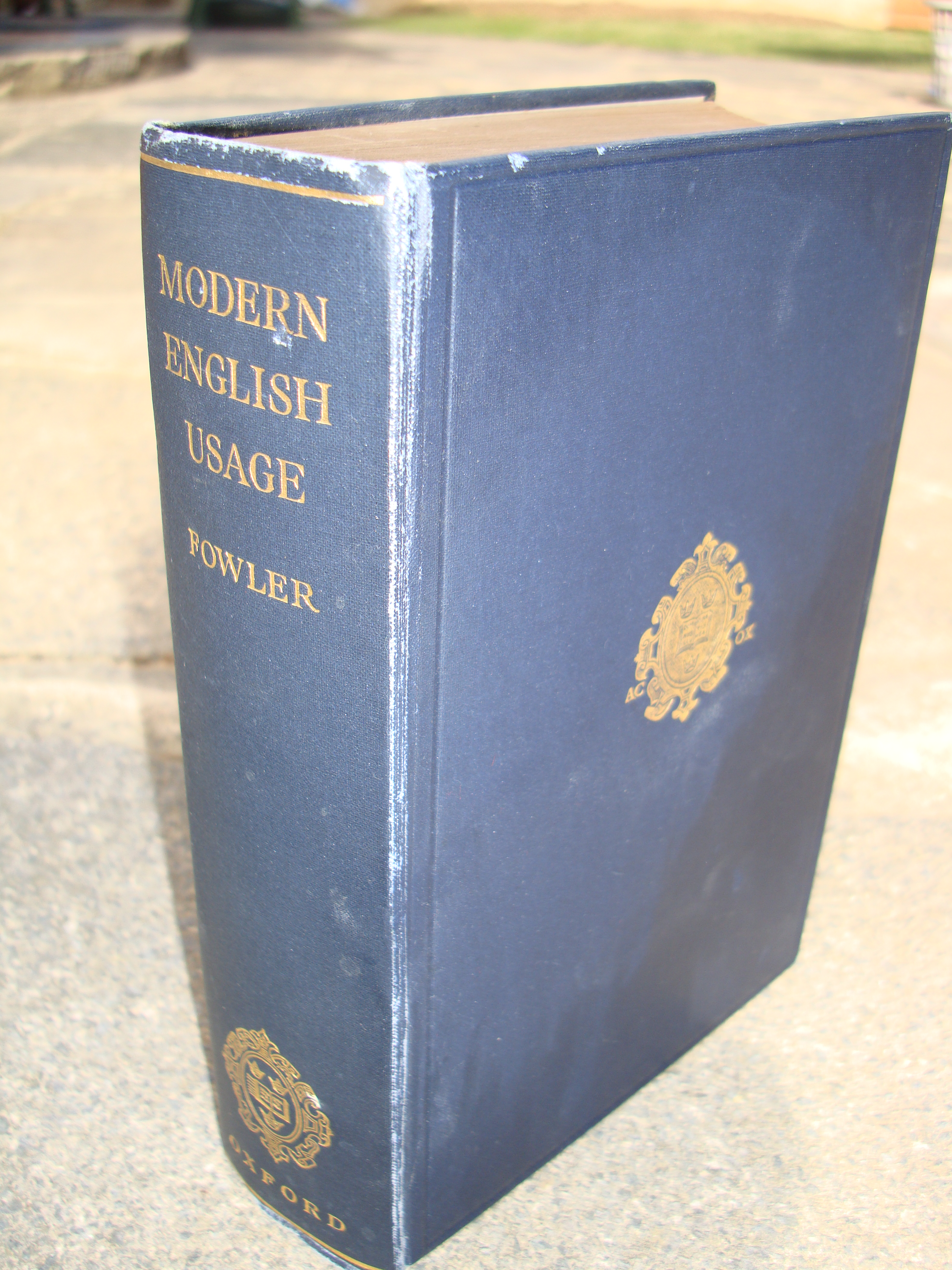
A Dictionary of Modern English Usage (1926).

=== Books ===
- More Popular Fallacies. London: Elliot Stock, 1904.
- The Works of Lucian of Samosata. Complete with exceptions specified in the preface. Vol. I. Translated by Fowler, H. W.; Fowler, F. G. Oxford: Clarendon Press. 1905.; volume II; volume III; volume IV
- The King's English. Oxford: Clarendon Press, 1906.
- Sentence Analysis. Oxford: Clarendon Press, 1906.
- Si Mihi! London: Brown, Langham, 1907.
  - reissued as If Wishes Were Horses. London: George Allen & Unwin, 1929.
- Between Boy and Man. London: Watts, 1908.
- with F. G. Fowler. The King's English, abridged edition. Oxford: Clarendon Press, 1908.
- with F. G. Fowler. Concise Oxford Dictionary. Oxford: Clarendon Press, 1911 [2nd edition, 1929].
- with F. G. Fowler. Pocket Oxford Dictionary. Oxford: Clarendon Press, 1924.
- A Dictionary of Modern English Usage. Oxford: Clarendon Press, 1926. [Wordsworth Edition reprint, 1994, ISBN 1-85326-318-4.]
- Some Comparative Values. Oxford: Blackwell, 1929.
- Rhymes of Darby to Joan. London: J. M. Dent & Sons, 1931.
- with W. Little and J. Coulson. Shorter Oxford English Dictionary. Oxford: Clarendon Press, 1933.

=== Articles ===
- "Books We Think We Have Read". Spectator, 20 January 1900.
- "Outdoor London". Anglo-Saxon Review, June 1901.
- "Irony and Some Synonyms". Gentleman's Magazine, October 1901, 378.
- "Quotation". Longman's Magazine, January 1901, 241.
- "On Hyphens, 'Shall' & 'Will', 'Should' 'Would' in the Newspapers of Today". Society for Pure English, Tract 6. Oxford: Clarendon Press, 1921.
- "Note on 'as to'". Society for Pure English Tract 8. Oxford: Clarendon Press, 1922.
- "Grammatical Inversions". Society for Pure English Tract 10. Oxford: Clarendon Press, 1923.
- "Preposition at End". Society for Pure English Tract 14. Oxford: Clarendon Press, 1923.
- "Split Infinitive, &c." Society for Pure English Tract 15. Oxford: Clarendon Press, 1923.
- "Subjunctives". Society for Pure English Tract 18. Oxford: Clarendon Press, 1924.
- "Notes on fasci, fascisti, broadcast(ed)". Society for Pure English Tract 19. Oxford: Clarendon Press, 1925.
- "Italic, Fused Participles, &c." Society for Pure English Tract 22. Oxford: Clarendon Press, 1925.
- "Ing". Society for Pure English Tract 26. Oxford: Clarendon Press, 1927.
- "Comprise". Society for Pure English Tract 36. Oxford: Clarendon Press, 1925.

== See also ==
- Popular Fallacies, Charles Lamb

== Sources ==
- Burchfield, Robert, 3rd ed. Modern English Usage, Oxford University Press, 1996, ISBN 0-19-869126-2
- Coulton, G. C. H. W. Fowler. The Society for Pure English, Tract no. 43, 1935, a memoir by his friend and former colleague at Sedbergh School
- Gowers, Sir Ernest., 2nd ed. Modern English Usage, Oxford University Press, 1965
- McMorris, Jenny, The Warden of English: The Life of H.W. Fowler, Oxford University Press, 2001. ISBN 0-19-866254-8
- Onions, C. T. (ed). Shorter Oxford Dictionary, first edition, Oxford University Press, 1933
- Sheidlower, Jesse. "Elegant Variation and All That". Review of The New Fowler's Modern English Usage, by H. W. Fowler and ed. R. W. Burchfield. Atlantic Monthly, December 1996: 112–118, https://www.theatlantic.com/issues/96dec/fowler/fowler.htm.
