= List of contributors to the Oxford English Dictionary =

The following writers contributed to the Oxford English Dictionary.

== Chief editors ==
Chief editors of the OED
Name	Dates of chief editorship	Notes
Herbert Coleridge	1858–61	Preliminary work. Died in office.
Frederick J. Furnivall	1861–70	Preliminary work. Resigned.
James Murray	1879–1915	1st edition. Died in office.
Henry Bradley	1915–23	1st edition. Joined 1887. Died in office.
William Craigie	1923–33	1st edition and 1st Supplement, jointly with Onions. Joined 1901.
Charles Talbut Onions	1923–33	1st edition and 1st Supplement, jointly with Craigie. Joined 1914.
Robert Burchfield	1957–86	2nd Supplement
Edmund Weiner	1985–89	2nd edition jointly with Simpson; also worked on 3rd edition. Joined 1977.
John Simpson	1985–2013	2nd edition jointly with Weiner; 3rd edition chief editor from 1993. Joined 1976.
Michael Proffitt	2013–	3rd edition. Joined 1989.

== Other contributors ==
- Hucks Gibbs, 1st Baron Aldenham
- Sir William Anson, 3rd Baronet
- George Latimer Apperson
- Edward Arber
- Henry Spencer Ashbee
- John Christopher Atkinson
- Clarence Barnhart
- George Fielding Blandford
- Katherine Harris Bradley
- James Britten
- Elizabeth Brown
- Thomas Nadauld Brushfield
- Ingram Bywater
- Robert William Chapman
- Albert Huntington Chester
- Andrew Clark (priest)
- Edith Emma Cooper
- Edward Dowden
- Thomas Messinger Drown
- Robert Druitt
- Jonathan Eastwood
- Alexander John Ellis
- Robinson Ellis
- Frederick Thomas Elworthy
- Daniel Silvan Evans
- Wendell Phillips Garrison
- Peter Gilliver
- Alexander Balloch Grosart
- Fitzedward Hall
- Beatrice Harraden
- Joyce Hawkins
- William Carew Hazlitt
- Richard Oliver Heslop
- William Ballantyne Hodgson
- Clement Mansfield Ingleby
- Benjamin Daydon Jackson
- Benjamin Jowett
- Thomas Hewitt Key
- Friedrich Kluge
- Marghanita Laski
- John Knox Laughton
- John Wickham Legg
- Henry Liddell
- Augustus Edward Hough Love
- Falconer Madan
- Frederic William Maitland
- Francis March
- David Samuel Margoliouth
- George Perkins Marsh
- Eleanor Marx
- Paul Meyer
- William Chester Minor
- William Morfill
- Anna Morpurgo Davies
- Edward Ellis Morris
- Richard Morris
- Horatio Mosley Moule
- Max Müller
- H. J. R. Murray
- Margaret Murray
- Eadweard Muybridge
- Arthur Napier
- Alfred Newton
- Edward Nicholson
- Edward Peacock
- Flinders Petrie
- John Thompson Platts
- Sir Frederick Pollock, 3rd Baronet
- Frederick York Powell
- L. F. Powell
- Hereward Thimbleby Price
- Richard Bissell Prosser
- June Purvis
- Philip Pye-Smith
- John Rhys
- John Richardson
- Charles Pierre Henri Rieu
- Henry Roscoe
- William Michael Rossetti
- Jesse Sheidlower
- Walter William Skeat
- William Barclay Squire
- John Stainer
- W. H. Stevenson
- William Stubbs
- Edward Sugden
- Charles William Sutton
- Henry Sweet
- Joseph Robson Tanner
- William Turner Thiselton-Dyer
- J. R. R. Tolkien
- Beatrix Lucia Catherine Tollemache
- Lucy Toulmin Smith
- Paget Toynbee
- Richard Chenevix Trench
- Henry Frederic Turle
- Edward Burnett Tylor
- Herbert Warren
- Hensleigh Wedgwood
- Richard Francis Weymouth
- Richard Grant White
- William Dwight Whitney
- R. J. Whitwell
- Joseph Wright
- Charlotte Mary Yonge
- Henry Yule
- Ghil'ad Zuckermann

== See also ==
- The Dictionary People
- The Meaning of Everything
- The Surgeon of Crowthorne
