= The Dictionary People =

2023 non-fiction book by Sarah Ogilvie

- Author: Sarah Ogilvie
- Language: English
- Subject: Volunteer contributors to the Oxford English Dictionary
- Publisher: Chatto & Windus
- Publication date: 2023
- Pages: 368 pp.
- ISBN: 978-0-593-53640-7
- Dewey Decimal: 423.0922
- LC Class: PE1617.O94

The Dictionary People: The Unsung Heroes Who Created the Oxford English Dictionary is a 2023 book by Sarah Ogilvie. The book examines the volunteer contributors who responded to public appeals by the Oxford English Dictionary for words. After finding address books that had belonged to editor James Murray in the basement archive of the Oxford University Press, Ogilvie conducted research into the identities of the contributors. Murray's address books, combined with those of Frederick Furnivall, included the names of some 3000 volunteers alongside the words they had submitted quotations for and which books they had used.

The Dictionary People is structured as an abecedary, with each chapter focusing on a particular type of contributor, such as "C for Cannibal", "H for Hopeless", and "P for Pornographer".

== Background ==
The Oxford English Dictionary (OED) was conceived in 1857 but was not finished until 1928. Frederick Furnivall spent 20 years as its editor before James Murray took over in 1879. The dictionary published appeals in journals and newspapers for readers to contribute to the work, requesting that volunteers send in etymologies of "every word that strikes you as rare, obsolete, old-fashioned, new, peculiar, or used in a peculiar way". By 1880, the project had collected 2.5 million slips.

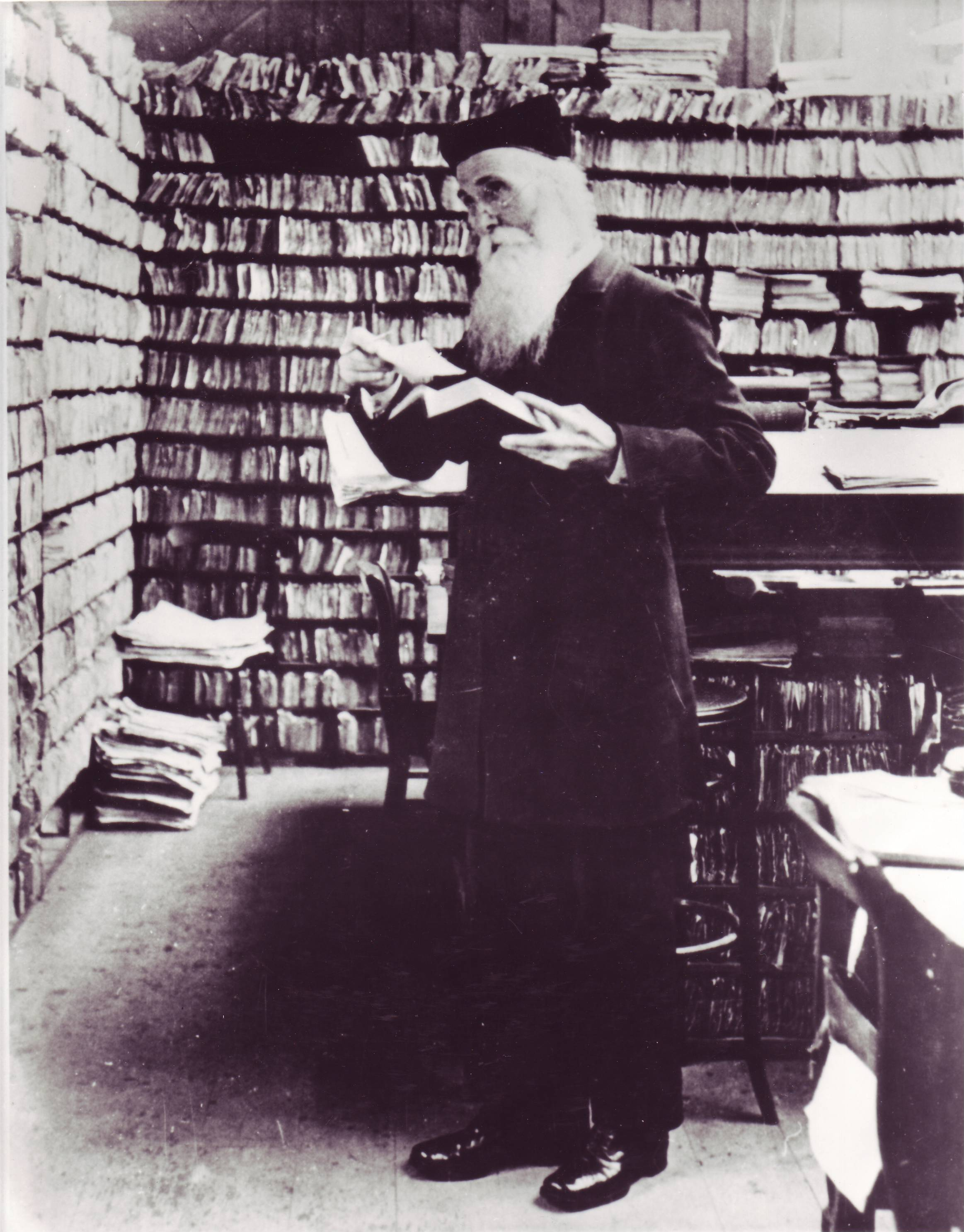
OED editor James Murray in his Scriptorium

Lexicographer Sarah Ogilvie worked as an editor on the third edition of the OED. Towards the end of 2014, nearing the end of her employment with the OED, she found three of James Murray's handwritten address books in the basement archive of the Oxford University Press. Murray recorded the names and addresses of the readers who had sent in slips. While the address books had been catalogued by the archivists, they had apparently gone unexamined by researchers. In the summer of 2015, Ogilvie found three additional address books that had belonged to OED editor Frederick Furnivall in the Bodleian Library. Between the six address books, the names of some 3000 volunteer contributors were identified.

The address books contained the names of the volunteer contributors, which words they had provided quotations for, and which books they had used. Murray would update the entries in the address books and mark them with various notations, including designations such as "Hopeless", "Impostor" and "No Good". Ogilvie conducted research into the identities of the volunteer correspondents which culminated in the publishing of The Dictionary People by Chatto & Windus in 2023.

== Overview ==
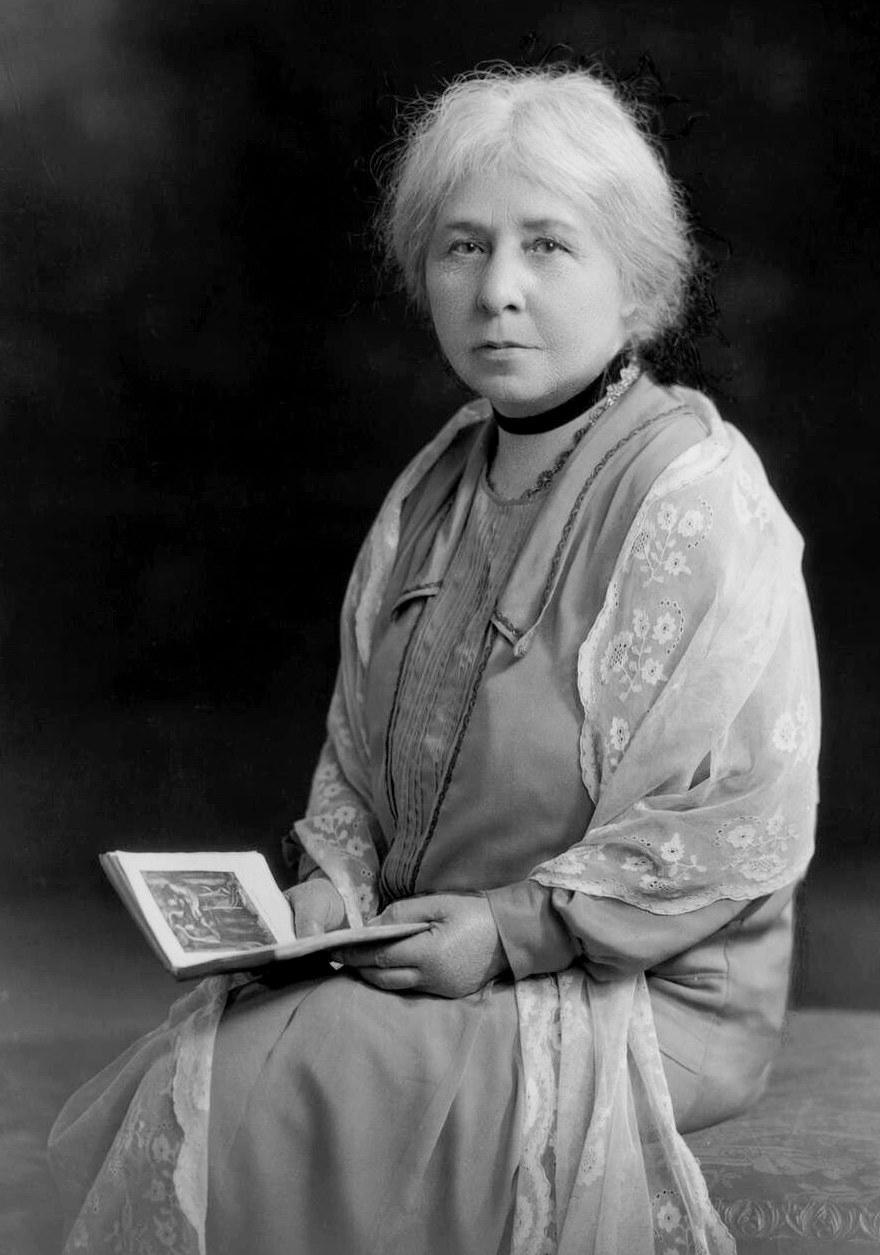
Contributor Margaret Murray, subject of the chapter "A for Archaeologist"

The Dictionary People is arranged as an abecedary, with each chapter focusing on a particular type of contributor, starting with "A for Archaeologist", "B for Best Contributor", and "C for Cannibal". Volunteer readers for the OED included the academic elite as well as amateurs. While some of the contributors included in the book are well-known figures, many were autodidacts and outside of academia. As a crowdsourced project, Ogilvie describes the OED as "the Wikipedia of the nineteenth century."

Ogilvie highlights a subset of the contributors, focusing on the most eccentric, including a cannibal, three murderers and "several institutionalised lunatics" and a "cocaine addict found dead in a railway station lavatory". The chapter "P for Pornographer" discusses the contributions of prolific erotica collector Henry Spencer Ashbee, who was "an enthusiastic supplier of scatological vocabulary".

In the chapter "B for Best Contributors", Ogilvie identifies the most prolific contributors to the OED. The volunteers who submitted the most words were Thomas Austin Jnr (165,061), William Douglas (151,982), Thomas Nadauld Brushfield (70,277), and William Chester Minor (62,720). All four of them spent time in a mental institution at some point in their lives. Minor, who was committed to a psychiatric hospital after shooting a man, was with Murray the subject of Simon Winchester's 1998 book The Surgeon of Crowthorne, which was adapted into the 1999 film The Professor and the Madman.

Ogilvie determined that one out of every six of the volunteer contributors was a woman, a rate of participation that was thought to be less. Women contributors included Eleanor Marx ("H for Hopeless"), the secretary of the Birmingham Women's Suffrage Society, and future Egyptologist Margaret Murray, who sent in 5,000 slips during her youth in India, including 3,800 citations sourced from the Douay Bible". Astronomer Elizabeth Brown and her sister Jemima contributed 16,000 slips to the OED. Incestuous aunt-niece duo Katherine Bradley and Edith Emma Cooper, who wrote poetry under the pseudonym Michael Field, were also volunteer contributors.

In the "I for Inventors" chapter, The Dictionary People discusses the many volunteer contributors who were also inventors. Among them are the inventors of the tennis-net adjuster, the sewage pipe, an electric tricycle, and "indelible green ink for printing money".

Ogilvie conducted a network analysis of the contributors and the clubs that they belonged to. Alexander John Ellis was identified as a "super-connector" among the various contributors, having both a high-scoring eigenvector centrality and betweenness centrality. The analysis also determined that the Early English Text Society, founded by Frederick Furnivall, was the most influential society among the contributors.

In The Dictionary People, Ogilvie highlights the contributions of contemporary OED volunteer Chris Collier, an Australian who has submitted over 100,000 entries.

== Reception ==
A review in The New York Times found The Dictionary People to be "sprightly" as well as "lively and entertaining". The review noted that "The real joy of The Dictionary People is to be reminded that any group of people pinned at its intersection will still burst forth every which way, a tapestry of contradictions, noble and ignoble, wild and banal. In the lives of these uneminent Victorians, Ogilvie has shown us that humanity, even for word nerds, is always—as Jane Austen might put it—sprawly, fragmented and irrepressible.” A review in The Economist concluded that "The Dictionary People will appeal to logophiles". A warm review in the Guardian ends, 'We like to think that language is our creation; the truth is that it created us, and we are its babbling mouthpiece.'. The Sunday Times described the book as 'astonishing.'

== Notable OED contributors ==
- Henry Spencer Ashbee
- George Fielding Blandford
- Elizabeth Brown
- Thomas Nadauld Brushfield
- Alexander John Ellis
- William Chester Minor
- Eleanor Marx
- Margaret Murray
- Eadweard Muybridge
- Flinders Petrie
- John Thompson Platts
- John Richardson
- Charles William Sutton
- Joseph Wright

== See also ==
- The Meaning of Everything
