= Francis March =

American classical philologist (1825–1911)

Francis Andrew March LL.D, D.H.L, D.C.L., Litt.D
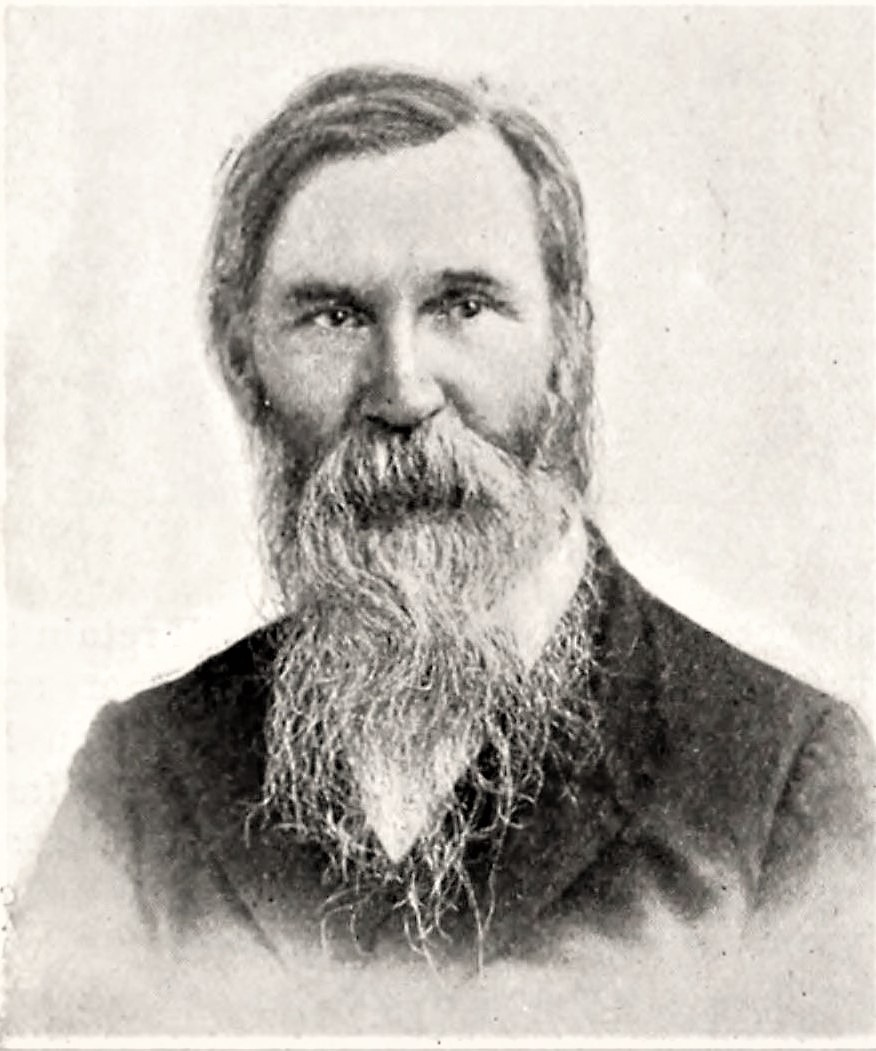
- An 1895 illustration of March
- Born: October 25, 1825; Millbury, Massachusetts, U.S.
- Died: September 9, 1911 (aged 85); Easton, Pennsylvania, U.S.
- Occupations: Professor, Lafayette College
- Known for: Founder of modern comparative linguistics First professor of English in a University setting
- Board member of: President of the American Philological Association (1873–1874; 1895–1896); President of the Modern Language Association (1891–1893)
- Spouse: Margaret Mildred Stone Conway (m. 1860)
- Children: 9, including Peyton C. March

Academic background
- Education: Amherst College

Academic work
- Discipline: Philology

Francis Andrew March (October 25, 1825 – September 9, 1911) was an American polymath, academic, philologist, and lexicographer. He is considered the principal founder of modern comparative linguistics in Old English.

Also known as the "Grand Old Man of Lafayette", March was the first individual to hold the title "Professor of English Language and Literature" anywhere in the United States or Europe. March is predominantly recognized for performing his duties as "Professor of the English Language and Comparative Philology" at Lafayette College, where he taught for 56 years.

== Early life and education ==
March was born on October 25, 1825, in Sutton, Massachusetts, in present-day Millbury, Massachusetts. Three years later, his family relocated to Worcester, Massachusetts. As a child, he was educated in the Worcester public school system. March recalled being grateful for the education he received in the district, explaining his kindergarten teacher "made the children understand many things before the usual time." This prepared him for high school, where March became a clever and active participant in his classes and activities. He became a writer, read on a wide range of subjects, performed in school plays, and even wrote plays himself.

At the age of 15, March was ready for college, but his father experienced business troubles which hindered March's ability to afford tuition. The Honorable Alfred D. Foster of Worcester, however, offered to fund a portion of his education at Amherst College. During his time in college, March maintained prominence in scholarship as well and athletics. He graduated in 1845 as valedictorian and as a member of Phi Beta Kappa. He also received an M.A. degree from Amherst in 1848, with an oration on "Relation of the Study of Jurisprudence to the Baconian Philosophy." During his time at Amherst, his attention to the study of Anglo-Saxon was inspired by Noah Webster.

== Career ==
=== Teaching ===
Immediately following his graduation from Amherst, March began teaching at an academy in Swanzey, New Hampshire. He then taught for two years at Leicester Academy in Leicester, Massachusetts, where he began formulating his plan to teach English and literature. From 1847 to 1848, he was a tutor at his alma mater.

March also expressed an interest in law. In 1849, he entered as a law student for the office of Barney and Butler. A year later, March was admitted to the New York bar. He began practicing the profession with partner Gordon L. Ford Esq. However, in 1852, March experienced severe health issues. He suffered a hemorrhage of the lungs and was rushed to Cuba, where it was hoped that Cuba's gentler climate would alleviate the problem, which it did. He resumed work the following year, securing a position teaching law at a private academy in Fredericksburg, Virginia, for three years.

=== Lafayette College ===
After studying law and teaching, March became an English tutor at Lafayette College in Easton, Pennsylvania, in 1856, appointed by the college's new president George Wilson McPhail. He worked for one year as a tutor and then became a professor of English Language and Comparative Philology from 1857 to 1907. Lafayette was the first college in the world to have the philology of the English language studied – a course all American colleges soon thereafter incorporated into their own curricula. March was the first to hold the title of "Professor of English Language and Literature" anywhere in the United States or Europe. He also occupied the chair of English Language and Comparative Philology, and served as the first librarian of the college.

March had a significant career at Lafayette College and remained loyal to the school, often turning down offers from larger universities as his published work and teaching style became more well-known. March helped improve Lafayette by using his wisdom and insight to bring the college to a new stage. He was devoted to both increasing the analysis of English literature in higher institutions, as well as in growing the college's academics. In addition to English, March also taught French, German, Greek, Latin, botany, "mental philosophy", political economy, critical examination of the US Constitution, public law and Roman law.

March brought a new outlook to teaching English by introducing a detailed examination of linguistic and rhetorical pieces. By applying the methods of studying Latin and Greek classics towards the study of English literature, he led the way for the first scientific study of the English language. March is also said to be the first person to include one of Shakespeare's plays on his course syllabus. March had a pedagogical philosophy and unique approach to the systematic study of the English language. His outlook was "the greatest pioneering step ever made in the realm of scholarship by Lafayette College." One of his most distinct analytical contributions was his philology-across-the-curriculum approach in which "professors train the students in each department to write on subjects connected with it in the words and phrases current among experts."

March had a son who also became an English professor at Lafayette and they worked alongside each other.

=== Academic focus ===
==== Philology ====
Outside of teaching, Francis A. March contributed to many advancements in philology. He contributed to over 200 periodical publications in philology, the historical study of grammar, the teaching of literature, and pedagogy. In addition, he published four volumes of Latin and Greek classics. In 1869, he published what is considered to be his masterpiece, "A Comparative Grammar of the Anglo-Saxon Language." This work gained him recognition as a distinguished scholar in the philological world. From 1873 to 1874, and again from 1895 to 1896, he served as the president of the American Philological Association. Later, in 1903 he published "A Thesaurus Dictionary of the English Language."

==== Spelling reform ====
March was one of the chief reformers in the spelling of English words. He believed in simpler spellings. In his writings, he often spelled words phonetically to emphasize his passion for spelling reform. In 1876, he became the permanent President of the Spelling Reform Association. He remained president until 1906.

==== Lexicography ====
March also pursued an interest in Lexicography. This may have stemmed from his connection with Noah Webster. March initially heard Webster speak while he was a student at Amherst College. He also studied under Webster's son-in-law, William Chauncey Fowler. Webster's Dictionary also had a strong impact on March. March aligned with the premise that spelling, grammar, and usage should be based on the spoken word. March was the first American superintendent over the volunteer reading program of the Oxford English Dictionary, thus providing valuable support to James Murray in the compilation of this monumental work. He also served as the consulting editor of Funk and Wagnalls' Standard Dictionary from 1879 to 1892.

=== Personal life ===
March married Margaret Mildred Stone Conway (1837–1911) on August 12, 1860. Together they had nine children: historian Francis Andrew March Jr., Peyton C. March, Thomas Stone March, Alden March, Moncure March, John Lewis March, Mildred March, Margaret D. March, and General Peyton C. March. Francis A. March Jr. later worked at Lafayette College as a professor and became the namesake for Lafayette College's March Field. General Peyton C. March was chief of staff of the United States Army during the First World War. Meanwhile, Thomas Stone March became a superintendent of schools in Greensburg, Pennsylvania; Alden March became a Sunday editor of The New York Times;and John Lewis March became a professor of modern languages at Union College in Schenectady, New York.

=== Death ===
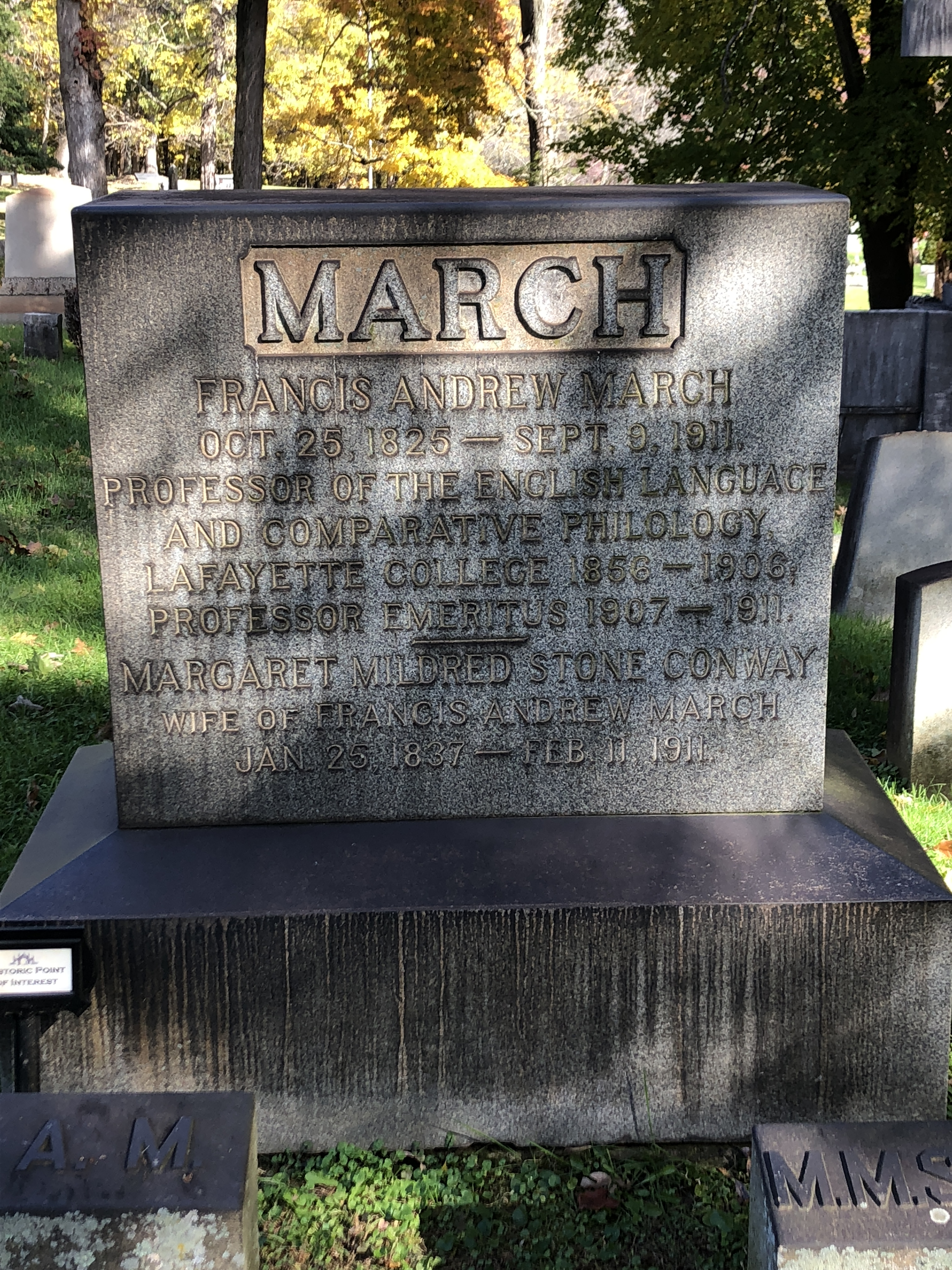
March's burial site in Easton, Pennsylvania

Francis A. March died on September 9, 1911, at the age of 85 in his home on Lafayette College's campus. He is buried in Easton Cemetery in Northampton County, Pennsylvania. On December 30, 1913, in Cambridge, Massachusetts, March's colleague, Professor James Bright, delivered a commemoration in his honor at the Joint Session of the American Philological Association and the Modern Language Association.

== Legacy ==
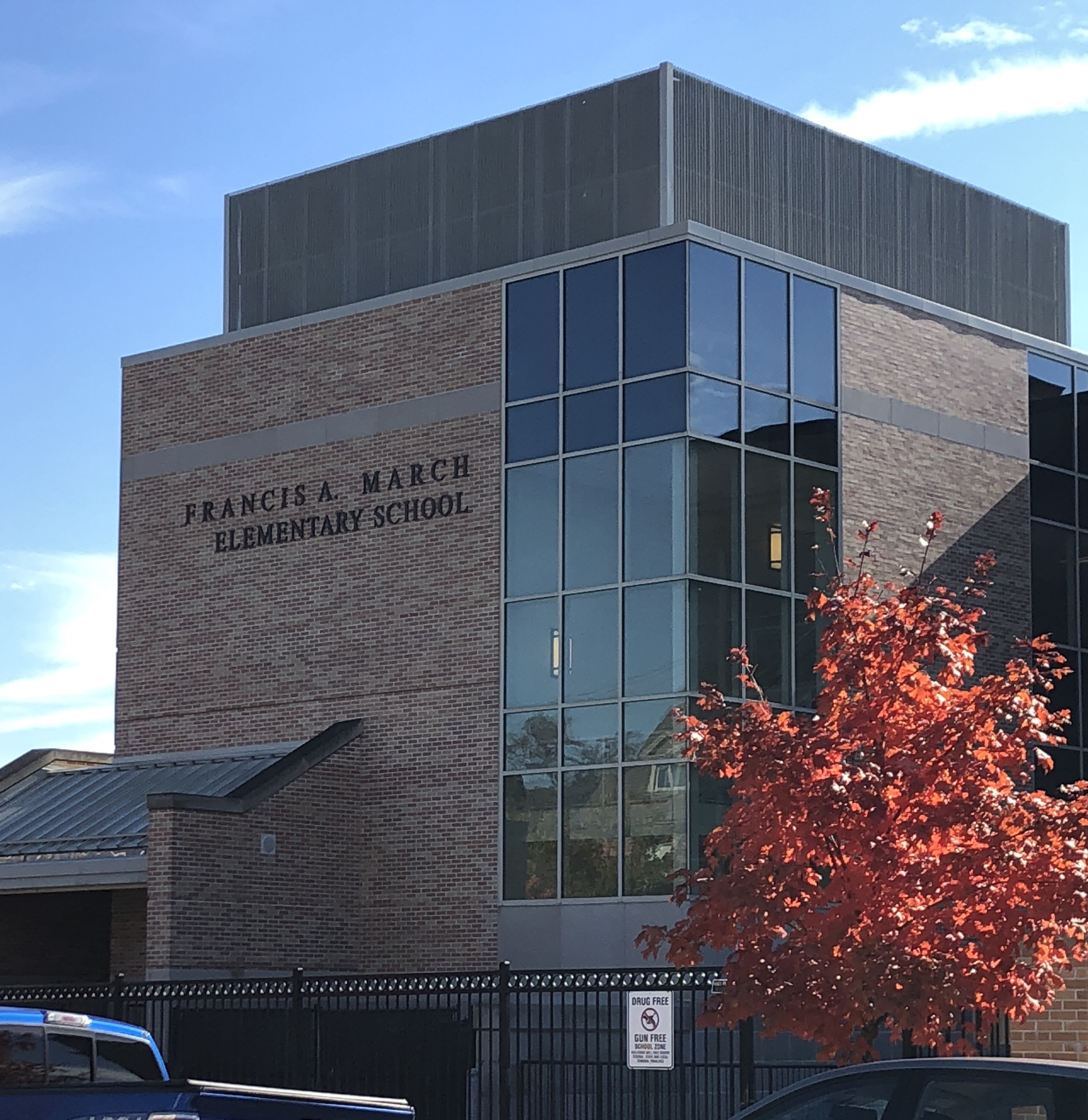
Francis A. March Elementary School, named in March's honor, in the Easton Area School District

March worked at Lafayette College for more than fifty years, passing up opportunities at other institutions in order to continue to study, teach, and publish at the small liberal arts school.

While praised for his hard work, March is also remembered for being the first academic in the country to study and teach English texts in the same manner professors taught Greek and Latin classics. His examination of the English language led Lafayette College to set up the first chair at any college in the United States for the study of English texts from a modern viewpoint. Lafayette College maintains a chaired professorship in March's honor. Lafayette College also has a Francis A. March Fellowship that is awarded to a senior who has excelled in the English department and has been accepted into a graduate school approved by the college's English department. Beyond his professional impact, colleague James A. Bright, also commented on how March personally shaped the Lafayette College community. Bright spoke highly of the way in which March built relationships with faculty and served as a mentor to students.

March's lasting legacy can also be seen in the wider Easton, Pennsylvania, community, where an elementary school is named in his honor. Francis A. March Elementary School in the College Hill Residential Historic District is part of the Easton Area School District, which serves Northampton County.

The wider academic community has also recognized the value of March's contributions and work. Each year, the Modern Language Association gives two distinguished scholar-teachers awards named after Francis A. March. The Association of Departments of English has established the Francis Andrew March Award to recognize and honor scholars who have made paramount contributions to the study of English.

== Achievements and honorary degrees ==
Francis A. March's monumental works have been highly recognized in academia. March was the first to hold the title of "Professor of English Language and Literature" in both the United States and Europe. This appointment was "the greatest pioneering step ever made in the realm of scholarship by Lafayette College," as described in the Skillman biography of the college.

He was elected president of the Modern Language Association from 1891 to 1893, president of the American Philological Association from 1873 to 1893 and 1895 to 1896, president of the Spelling Reform Association of 1876 to 1905, and was the vice president of London's New Shakspere Society, deliberately spelled with an archaic spelling of Shakespeare's name.

March was also the first American member of London's Philosophical Society and Paris's L’Association Fonetique de Professeurs de Langues Vivants. In 1878, March was elected as a member to the American Philosophical Society.

On October 21, 1881, March was elected into the American Antiquarian Society. Members are elected by their colleagues for their tremendous contributions and discoveries within academia.

During his 56-year career at Lafayette College, March received several honorary degrees from world-renowned academic institutions. In 1870, Princeton University awarded March with the degree of Legum Doctor (LL.D). In 1887, Columbia University commemorated March with the degree of Doctor of Humane Letters (D.H.L.).

In 1896, he was awarded both the degree of Doctor of Civil Law (D.C.L.) from the University of Oxford, as well as the degree of Doctor of Letters (Litt.D) from the University of Cambridge. At this time, March was one of only six people to ever be honored with such prestigious accolades by these universities.

== Bibliography ==
- Method of Philological Study of the English Language (1865)
- A Parser and Analyzer for Beginners (1869)
- A Comparative Grammar of the Anglo-Saxon Language (1870) (reprinted, 1977). Based on ten years of intensive research, the work examines the relationship of Anglo-Saxon to Sanskrit, Greek, Latin, and five Germanic languages.
- Introduction to Anglo-Saxon: An Anglo-Saxon Reader (1870)
- Latin Hymns with English Notes (1874)
- The Spelling Reform (1893), a contribution to the reform of English orthography.

=== Edited works ===
- March served as editor of the Douglass Series of Christian Greek and Latin Writers, to which he contributed Latin Hymns.
- With his son Francis Andrew March (1863–1928), he edited A Thesaurus Dictionary of the English Language (1903; 2nd ed., 1980).

== Sources ==
- Beach, Chandler B., ed. (1914). "March, Francis Andrew" . The New Student's Reference Work . Chicago: F. E. Compton and Co.
- Chisholm, Hugh, ed. (1911). "March, Francis Andrew" . Encyclopædia Britannica. Vol. 17 (11th ed.). Cambridge University Press. p. 688.
- Chisholm, Hugh, ed. (1922). "March, Francis Andrew" . Encyclopædia Britannica. Vol. 31 (12th ed.). London & New York: The Encyclopædia Britannica Company. p. 843.
- March, Francis A. (2005). Schlueter, Paul; Schlueter, June (eds.). Francis A. March: Selected Writings of the First Professor of English. Easton, PA: Lafayette College. ISBN 978-0-9765162-0-0.
- Simon Winchester, The Meaning of Everything (Oxford: Oxford University Press, 2003).
