= Hilda Murray (philologist) =

English philologist and literary scholar (1875–1951)

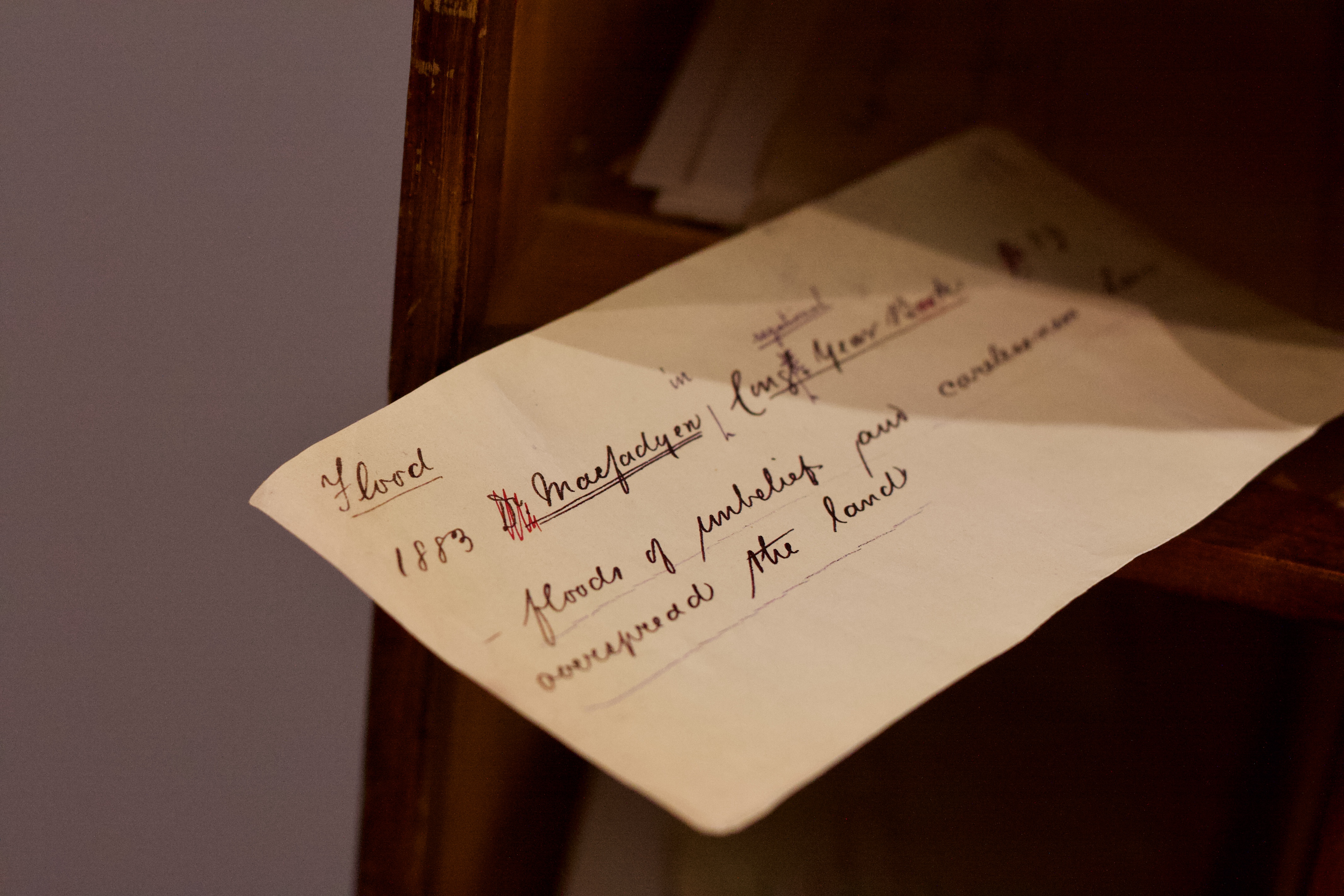
Hilda and her siblings created word cards for the Oxford English Dictionary as children.

Hilda Mary Emily Ada Ruthven Murray (1875–1951) was an English philologist and literary scholar.

== Early life and education ==
She was born 17 November 1875 in Mill Hill, London, daughter of the lexicographer Sir James Murray and his wife Ada, née Ruthven. She and her five siblings grew up writing out cards for her father's Oxford English Dictionary in return for pocket money. She was educated at Oxford High School and achieved a First Class in English Language and Literature from Oxford University in 1899, also taking a Cambridge degree in 1926.

== Academic career ==
From 1899 to 1915 she was lecturer in Germanic Philology at Royal Holloway. Afterwards she became director of studies and lecturer in medieval and modern languages, and subsequently in historical and comparative philology, at Girton College, Cambridge, where she was vice-mistress from 1924 to 1936.

== Publications ==
During her Oxford degree, Hilda continued her work on the Oxford English Dictionary, researching etymologies and providing statistical analysis for the introductory material.

In 1911, she published an edition and analysis of the Middle English poem Erthe upon Erthe with the Early English Text Society, collecting 25 versions of the poem from the fourteenth to the seventeenth centuries.

She published an edition of Robert Henryson’s fifteenth-century Selected Fables in 1930.

She died in Chichester, Sussex, on 23 August 1951.
