= The Professor and the Madman (film) =

2019 biographical film

- Theatrical release poster
- Directed by: P. B. Shemran
- Screenplay by: Todd Komarnicki; P. B. Shemran
- Based on: The Surgeon of Crowthorne by Simon Winchester
- Produced by: Nicolas Chartier; Gastón Pavlovich
- Starring: Mel Gibson; Sean Penn; Natalie Dormer; Eddie Marsan; Jennifer Ehle; Laurence Fox; Jeremy Irvine; David O'Hara; Ioan Gruffudd; Stephen Dillane; Steve Coogan
- Cinematography: Kasper Tuxen
- Edited by: Dino Jonsater
- Music by: Bear McCreary
- Production companies: Voltage Pictures; Fábrica de Cine; Definition Films; 22h22; Zik Zak Filmworks; Caviar Antwerp NV
- Distributed by: Vertical Entertainment
- Release date: May 10, 2019 (United States)
- Running time: 124 minutes
- Countries: United States; France; Iceland; Ireland
- Language: English
- Budget: $25 million
- Box office: $5.1 million

The Professor and the Madman is a 2019 biographical drama film directed by Farhad Safinia (under the pseudonym P. B. Shemran), from a screenplay by Safinia and Todd Komarnicki based on the 1998 book The Surgeon of Crowthorne (published in North America as The Professor and the Madman) by Simon Winchester. It stars Mel Gibson, Sean Penn, Natalie Dormer, Eddie Marsan, Jennifer Ehle, Jeremy Irvine, Lawrence Fox, David O'Hara, Ioan Gruffudd, Stephen Dillane, and Steve Coogan.

The film is about professor James Murray, who in 1879 became director of an Oxford University Press project, The New English Dictionary on Historical Principles (now known as the Oxford English Dictionary) and the man who became his friend and colleague, W. C. Minor, a doctor who submitted more than 10,000 entries while he was confined at Broadmoor Criminal Lunatic Asylum at Crowthorne after being found not guilty of murder due to insanity.

Shot in Dublin in 2016, the film became part of a legal battle between Gibson and Safinia against Voltage Pictures, delaying its release until 2019 and resulting in the pair disowning the final product.

== Plot ==
In 1872 London, retired United States Army surgeon William Chester Minor has hallucinations in which he sees himself being persecuted by a soldier he had to brand for desertion. During one of these visions, he mistakenly chases and kills innocent stranger George Merrett: for this crime, he is deemed insane and sent to Broadmoor. Meanwhile, Professor James Murray is admitted by Oxford University Press to the commission responsible for drafting what will be the Oxford English Dictionary, an impressive dictionary capable of listing every term of the English language and explaining its etymology and variations of meaning, with literary citations to support. The work began twenty years earlier, but completing it is difficult given the amount of work and the speed with which the English language changes. Murray thus has the idea of launching an appeal to the English people: he asks anyone who wishes to send the commission a postcard bearing a word reference. This earns Murray the post of commission director.

In Broadmoor, Minor alternates between moments of madness and lucidity; in one such episode, he saves the life of a guard by amputating his leg in an exemplary manner. For this reason, asylum director Richard Brayne decides to experiment with new techniques of psychological support: he allows Minor to keep a small library and to be able to paint. Minor also asks to donate his army pension to Eliza, the widow of the man he killed, but she initially refuses due to the hatred she harbors for him. Minor learns of Murray's initiative and begins to send him several hundreds of entries, complete with quotes and examples.

Minor's contributions salvage the work of the commission and Murray, but progress is still judged to be too slow by the patrons. Murray goes to meet Minor and discovers his condition, and a strong friendship is immediately established between them. Murray decides to keep Minor's condition secret from his Oxford colleagues and his wife Ada. Meanwhile, Eliza desperately accepts Minor's offer and goes to Broadmoor to face her husband's killer. However, Eliza finds herself pitying him and begins to visit him often, bringing him books as gifts; Minor reciprocates by teaching her to read so that she can pass it on to her children and allow them to have a better future. Brayne decides to let this relationship evolve as part of the healing experiment.

The first volume of the Oxford Dictionary is released, but some colleagues of the commission contest Murray that the work is not precise and lacks many commonly used words. Behind this protest is Henry Bradley, who wishes to discredit Murray and take his position as project manager. Meanwhile, the relationship between Minor and Eliza becomes increasingly close: Eliza introduces Minor to her children, but her eldest daughter slaps him, aware that she is facing her father's murderer. Shortly after, Eliza kisses Minor, asking him what he would do if the feeling she feels is really love. Minor's psyche is destabilized, and he has hallucinations of Eliza's husband; in a crisis, he proclaims he has "killed" him twice and severs his own penis. Brayne considers the experimental therapy a failure and revokes Minor's privileges, subjecting him to more violent methods.

A crisis is reached when a journalist commissioned by the Oxford Press to investigate Minor discovers the truth about him. However, moved with compassion, the journalist discusses the article with Murray, who thus comes to know what is going on. Bradley takes the opportunity as a pretext for Murray's ouster from the dictionary project, also ensuring that Minor's name is removed from the list of collaborators. Ada, initially shocked by the omissions, soon realizes how much she cares about her husband's friend and the dictionary, so she intercedes on his behalf before the commission. Murray arranges a meeting between Eliza and a catatonic Minor, who benefits from knowing that he has been forgiven and slowly improves. Murray, with the help of his patron Freddie Furnivall, manages to obtain a review of the trial in the hope of removing Minor from the asylum. Although Eliza intercedes on his behalf, the jury cannot withdraw the insanity diagnosis. Murray and Furnivall thus appeal to home secretary Winston Churchill. Hearing how passionately Murray defends Minor, Churchill decides to deport Minor to America as an unwanted alien. Minor and Murray say their final farewell before he leaves. Meanwhile, Furnivall obtains Murray's reinstatement as director of the commission for the Oxford Dictionary and the reinstatement of Minor's name among the collaborators in the drafting of the first volume.

Murray dies of pleurisy in 1915 after being knighted, while Minor dies of pneumonia in 1920. The Oxford English Dictionary is completed in 1928, 70 years after its conception, consisting of twelve volumes instead of the initially planned four and composed of more than 400,000 words accompanied by over a million citations.

== Cast ==
- Mel Gibson as James Murray
- Sean Penn as William Chester Minor
- Natalie Dormer as Eliza Merrett
- Eddie Marsan as Muncie, a guard at Broadmoor
- Jennifer Ehle as Ada Murray, Murray's second wife, mother of their 11 children
- Jeremy Irvine as Charles Hall
- David O'Hara as Church
- Anthony Andrews as Benjamin Jowett
- Ioan Gruffudd as Henry Bradley
- Stephen Dillane as Richard Brayne, alienist in charge at Broadmoor
- Steve Coogan as Frederick James Furnivall
- Laurence Fox as Philip Lyttelton Gell
- Lars Brygmann as Max Müller
- Brendan Patricks as Winston Churchill, Home Secretary
- Aidan McArdle as Edward Clarkem, a lawyer
- Adam Fergus as Alfred Minor
- Anthony Brophy as Sergeant Steggles
- Olivia McKevitt as Clare Merrett, Eliza's daughter
- Shane Noone as George Merrett, Eliza's husband

== Production ==
French director Luc Besson handed Mel Gibson the project, saying, "It isn't my first language. Maybe you can do something with this". Gibson, who originally intended to direct, hired his Apocalypto co-screenwriter Farhad Safinia to replace him, while he remained in the role of James Murray. Sean Penn entered early talks to join the film as William Chester Minor in August 2016. In August, Natalie Dormer signed on for a role. In September, Ioan Gruffudd joined the cast.

Filming commenced in Dublin in September 2016.

== Legal issues ==
In July 2017, Gibson and his production company Icon Productions sued the production company Voltage Pictures over their desire to control certain aspects of the production. Among other things, it was alleged that Voltage Pictures refused to schedule a "critical" five days of filming in Oxford and that the director was denied final cut privileges.

On June 19, 2018, Judge Ruth Kwan of the Los Angeles County Superior Court denied Gibson's motion for summary adjudication. The multiple lawsuits were the subject of a confidential settlement in April 2019. Gibson and Safinia issued statements distancing themselves from the project and calling the version released by Voltage "a bitter disappointment". They did not participate in the promotion of the film. Safinia was not recognized for directing or co-writing the film, being credited instead under a pseudonym, "P. B. Shemran".

== Release ==
Theatrical release in markets outside the U.S. began in March and April 2019. In January 2019, Vertical Entertainment acquired U.S. distribution rights to the film. The U.S. release date was May 10, 2019, with simultaneous limited theatrical release and video on demand.

=== Home media ===
The film was released in the United States through Vertical Entertainment on digital download on May 10, 2019, and DVD on August 13, 2019, by Lionsgate Films. It was released through the movie rental company Redbox on Blu-ray Disc. It was widely released on DVD in the United States on the same date.

== Critical reception ==
On the review aggregator website Rotten Tomatoes, the film holds an approval rating of 41%, based on 34 reviews, with an average rating of 5.5/10. On Metacritic, the film has a weighted average score of 27 out of 100, based on five critics, indicating "generally unfavorable reviews".

Nick Allen of RogerEbert.com gave the film one and a half out of four stars, calling it "the latest fiasco in bad movie history... the presence of Gibson and his co-star Sean Penn give the project a stuffy sanctimoniousness." Likewise, Jay Weissberg, reviewing for Variety, was more critical and stated: "For those that have been anticipating this curious, much-delayed oddity, the good news is that Gibson is fine; it's everything else that doesn't work."

In contrast, Tara McNamara, writing for Common Sense Media, said that: "Despite the fact that both the star/producer and the director have disavowed it, this isn't a bad film; it's beautifully shot and sensationally acted, and it tells a fascinating real-life story."
