= Korea: A Walk Through the Land of Miracles =

First edition (publ. Grafton Books)

Korea, A Walk Through the Land of Miracles (ISBN 0-06-075044-8) is a book by Simon Winchester. He recounts his experience walking across South Korea, from Jeju in the south to the DMZ in the north, roughly following a route originally taken by a group of Dutch sailors, reportedly the first Europeans to visit Korea. The book makes general observations about Korean society and culture along with recounting the most memorable encounters on the trip. He originally wrote the book in the mid-late 1980s, publishing it in 1988, during the final years of the military dictatorship that ruled the South Korea during the Fifth Republic. Winchester visited Gwangju only a few years after the Gwangju massacre, an event which marked dissatisfaction with the government.

== See also ==
- Contemporary culture of South Korea
- History of Korea
- Korean studies
