= Land (book) =

2021 book by Simon Winchester

Land: How the Hunger for Ownership Shaped the Modern World
- Author: Simon Winchester
- Language: English
- Publisher: Harper
- Publication date: January 19, 2021
- Pages: 464
- ISBN: 978-0-06-293833-6

Land: How the Hunger for Ownership Shaped the Modern World is a 2021 book by Simon Winchester.

== Content ==
The book details different conceptions of land ownership and the history of land ownership. It also discusses conflicts stemming from disagreements over land.

== Reception ==
=== Critical reception ===
Francisco Cantú's review in The New Yorker was mixed, praising Winchester's prose. However, Cantú noted a nostalgic tone that at times undercut the depictions of land appropriation and violence. Writing for the New York Times, Aaron Retica attests the book to be well-researched, but criticizes its lack of an identifiable thesis. In the Financial Times Delphine Strauss did identify a thesis to the book: that most disputes are fundamentally about land.
