= William Smith (geologist) =

English geologist (1769–1839)

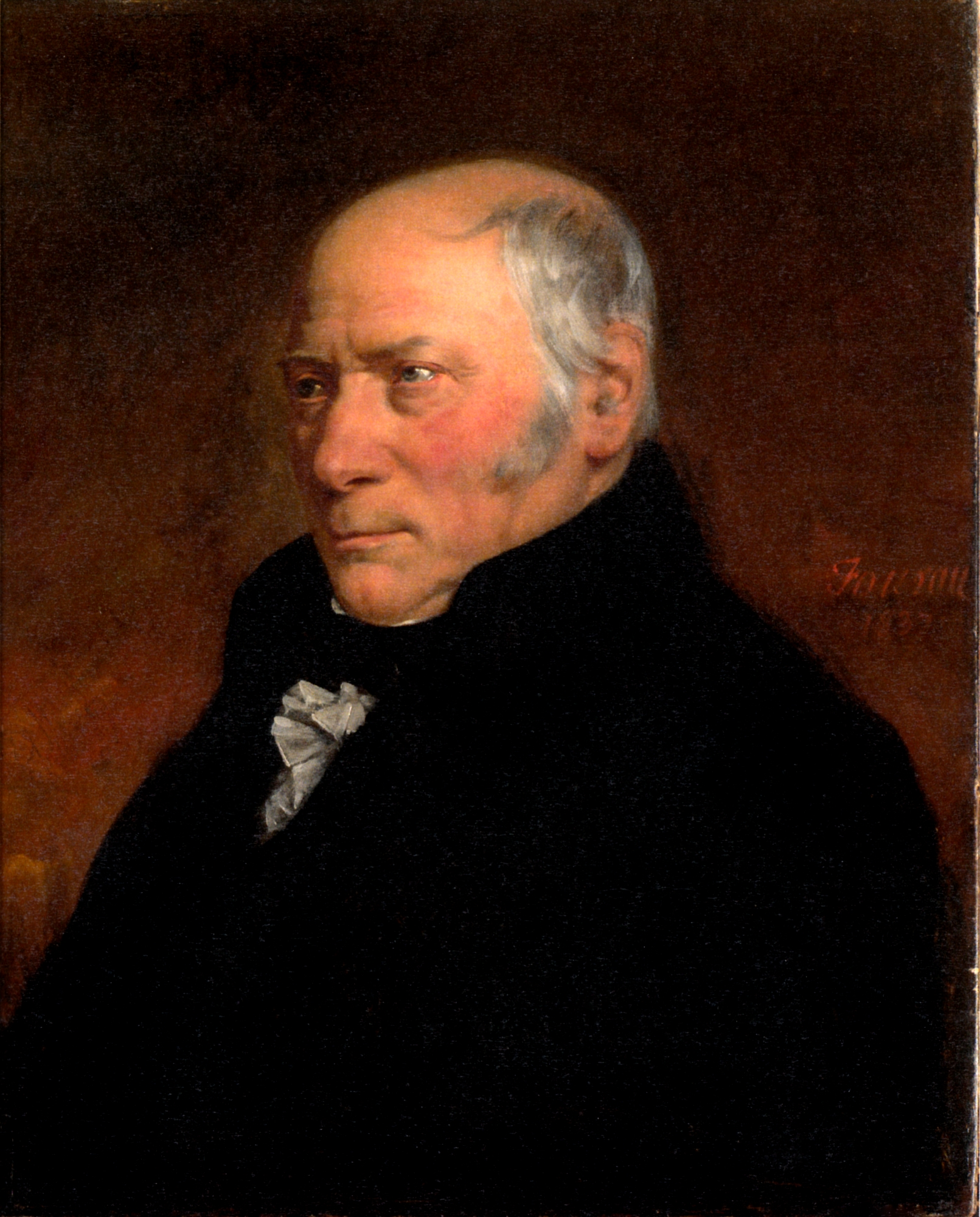
- 1837 portrait of Smith
- Born: 23 March 1769; Churchill, Oxfordshire, England
- Died: 28 August 1839 (aged 70); Northampton, England
- Known for: Geological map of England and Wales; Stratigraphy; Smith's laws
- Parents: John Smith (father); Ann, née Smith (mother)
- Awards: Wollaston Medal (1831)
- Scientific career
- Fields: Geology

William 'Strata' Smith (23 March 1769 – 28 August 1839) was an English geologist, credited with creating the first detailed, nationwide geological map of any country. At the time his map was first published he was overlooked by the scientific community; his relatively humble education and family connections prevented him from mixing easily in learned society. Financially ruined, Smith spent time in debtors' prison. It was only late in his life that Smith received recognition for his accomplishments, and became known as the "father of English geology".

== Early life ==
Smith was born on 23 March 1769, in Churchill, Oxfordshire, the son of John Smith (1735–1777), the village blacksmith, and his wife Ann (née Smith; 1745–1807). His father died when Smith was eight years old, and he and his siblings were raised by his uncle, a farmer also named William Smith. Largely self-educated, Smith was intelligent and observant, read widely from an early age, and showed an aptitude for mathematics and drawing. In 1787, he met and found work as an assistant for Edward Webb of Stow-on-the-Wold, Gloucestershire, a surveyor. He was quick to learn and soon became proficient at the trade.

In 1791, Smith travelled to Somerset to make a valuation survey of the Sutton Court estate, and building on earlier work in the same area by John Strachey. He stayed in the area for the next eight years, working first for Webb and later for the Somersetshire Coal Canal Company, living at Rugborne Farm in High Littleton. During this period, Smith inspected coal mines in the area, where he first observed and recorded the various layers of rock and coal exposed by the mining. Smith's coal mine studies, combined with his subsequent observations of the strata exposed by canal excavations, proved crucial to the formation of his theories of stratigraphy.

== Life's work ==
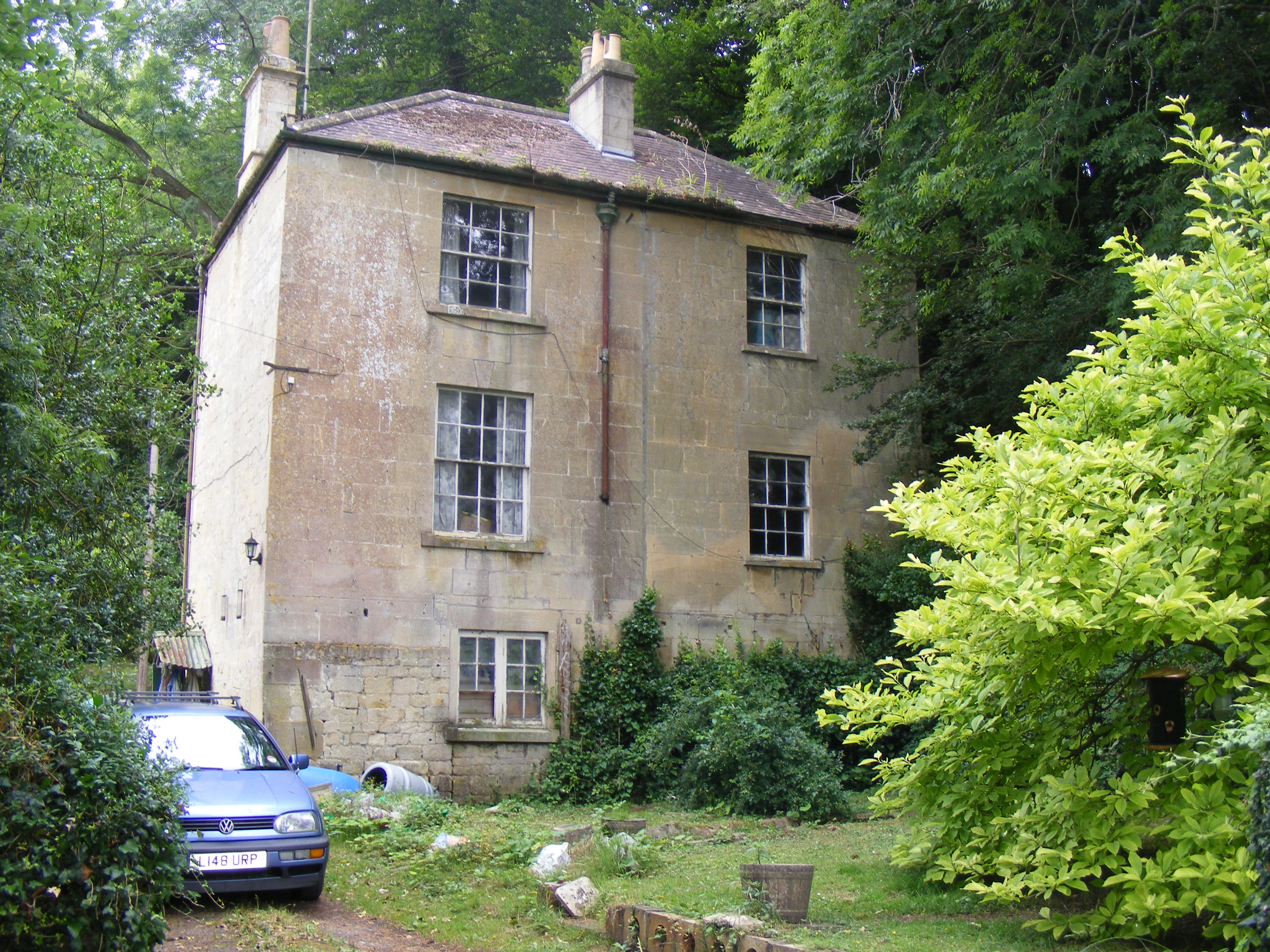
Tucking Mill House, near Monkton Combe, Somerset. A plaque on the house next door to Tucking Mill House states incorrectly that it was the home of William Smith.

Smith worked at one of the estate's older mines, the Mearns Pit at High Littleton, part of the Somerset coalfield and the Somerset Coal Canal. As he observed the rock layers (or strata) at the pit, he realised that they were arranged in a predictable pattern and that the various strata could always be found in the same relative positions. Additionally, each particular stratum could be identified by the fossils it contained, and the same succession of fossil groups from older to younger rocks could be found in many parts of England. Furthermore, he noticed an easterly dip of the beds of rock—low near the surface (about three degrees), then higher after the Triassic rocks. This gave Smith a testable hypothesis, which he termed the principle of faunal succession, and he began his search to determine if the relationships between the strata and their characteristics were consistent throughout the country. During subsequent travels, first as a surveyor (appointed by noted engineer John Rennie) for the canal company until 1799 when he was dismissed, and later, he was continually taking samples and mapping the locations of the various strata, and displaying the vertical extent of the strata, and drawing cross-sections and tables of what he saw. This would earn him the name "Strata Smith". As a natural consequence, Smith amassed a large and valuable collection of fossils of the strata he had examined himself from exposures in canals, road and railway cuttings, quarries and escarpments across the country. He also developed methods for the identification of deposits of Fuller's earth to the south of Bath, Somerset.

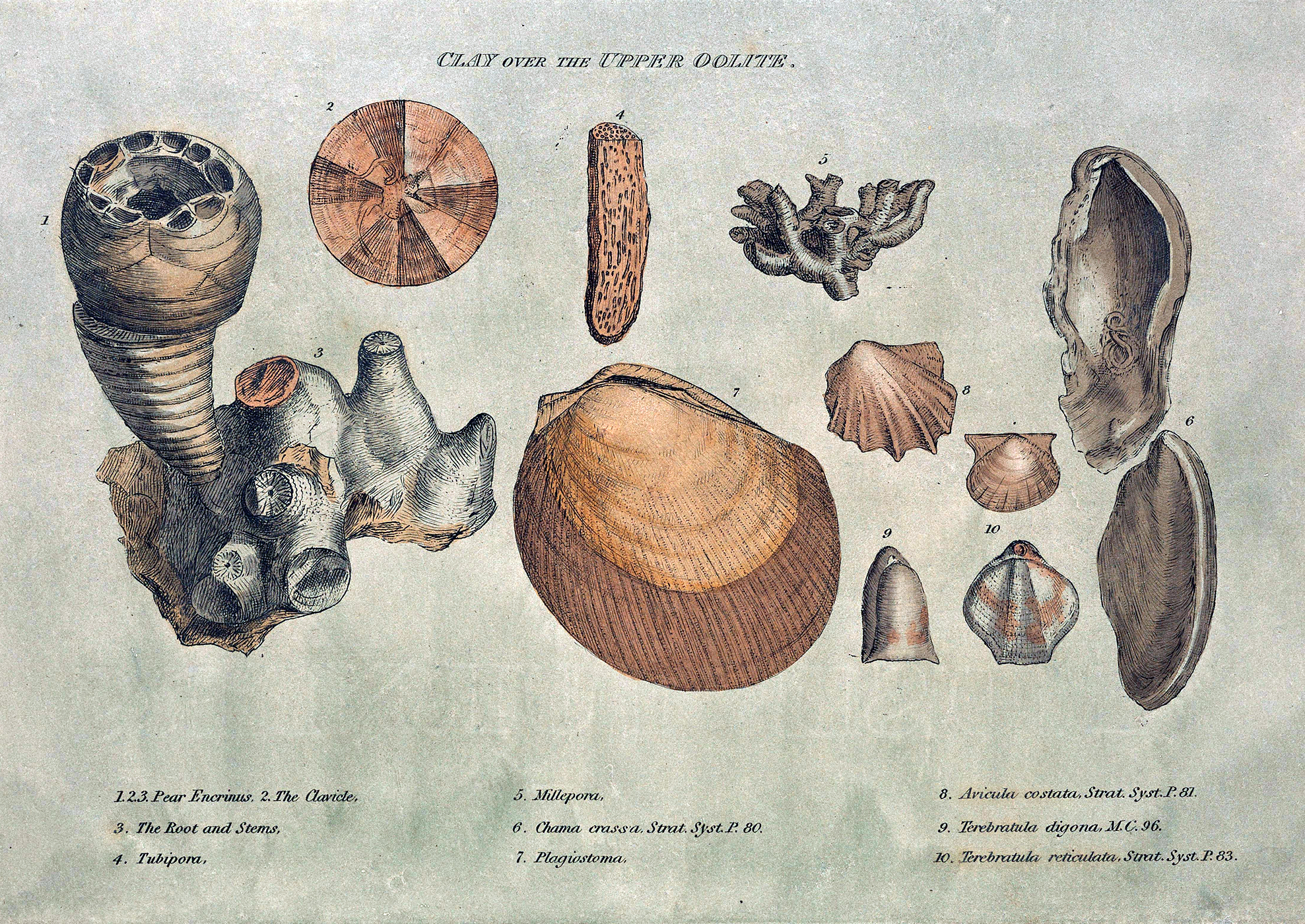
Engraving from William Smith's 1815 monograph on identifying strata by fossils showing an Encrinus

He published his findings with many pictures from his fossil collection, enabling others to investigate their distribution and test his theories. His collection is especially good on Jurassic fossils he collected from the Cornbrash, Kimmeridge Clay, Oxford Clay, Oolitic limestone and other horizons in the sequence. They included many types of brachiopods, ammonites and molluscs characteristic of the shallow seas in which they were deposited. Some of the names he coined (like Cornbrash) are still used today for this formation.

It could be seen from Smith's findings that the deeper – and therefore older – the strata were, the more the fossilised species within them differed from living organisms. This gave great support and impetus to the hypothesis of biological evolution (which pre-dated the work of Charles Darwin).

== Publication and disappointment ==
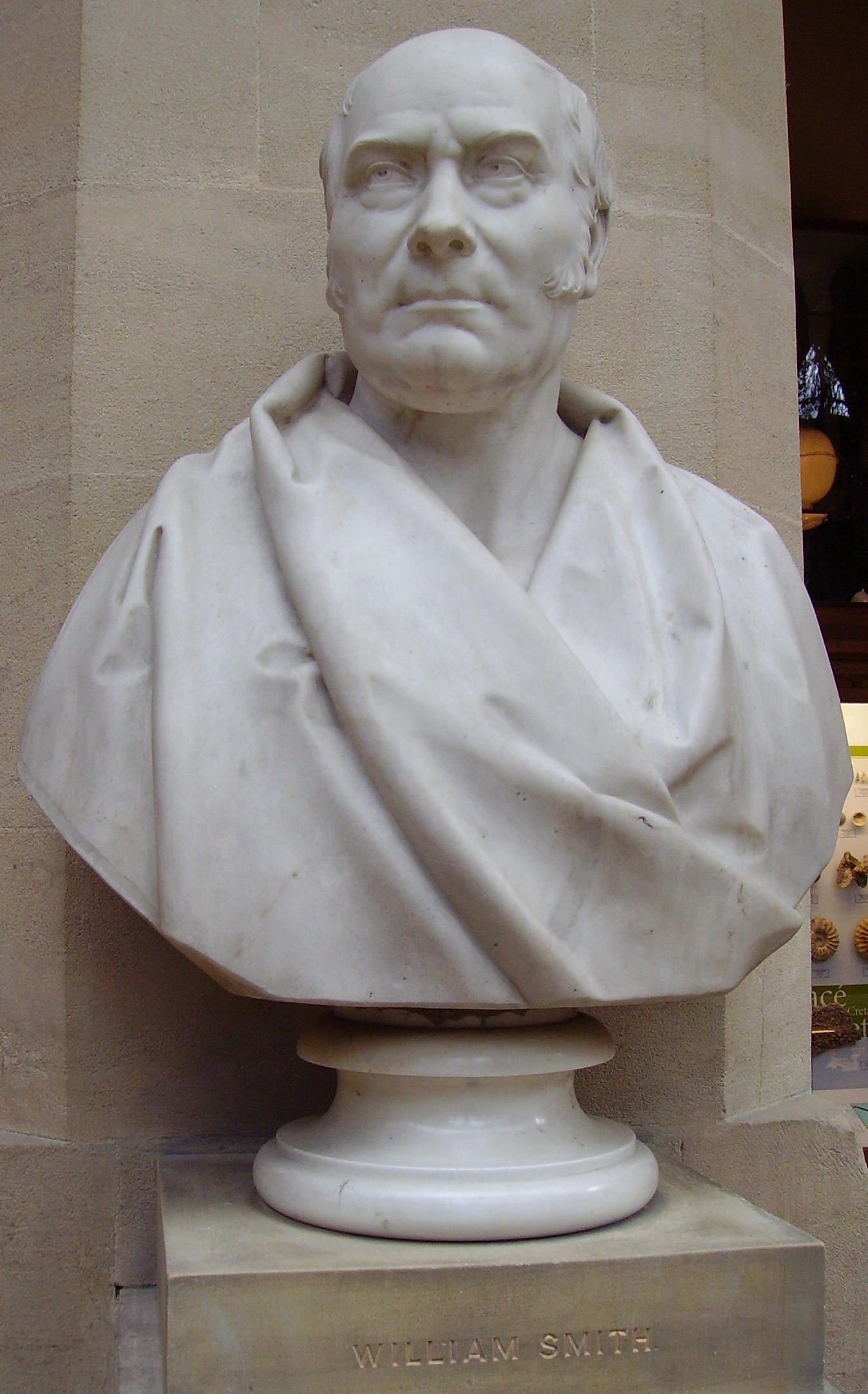
Bust of Smith, in the Oxford University Museum of Natural History

In 1799, Smith produced the first large-scale geological map of the area around Bath. Previously, he only knew how to draw the vertical extent of the rocks, but not how to display them horizontally. However, in the Somerset County Agricultural Society, he found a map showing the types of soils and vegetation around Bath and their geographical extent. Importantly, the differing types were coloured. Using this technique, Smith could draw a geological map from his observations showing the outcrops of the rocks. He took a few rock types, each with its own colour. Then he estimated the boundaries of each of the outcrops of rock, filled them in with colour and ended up with a crude geological map.

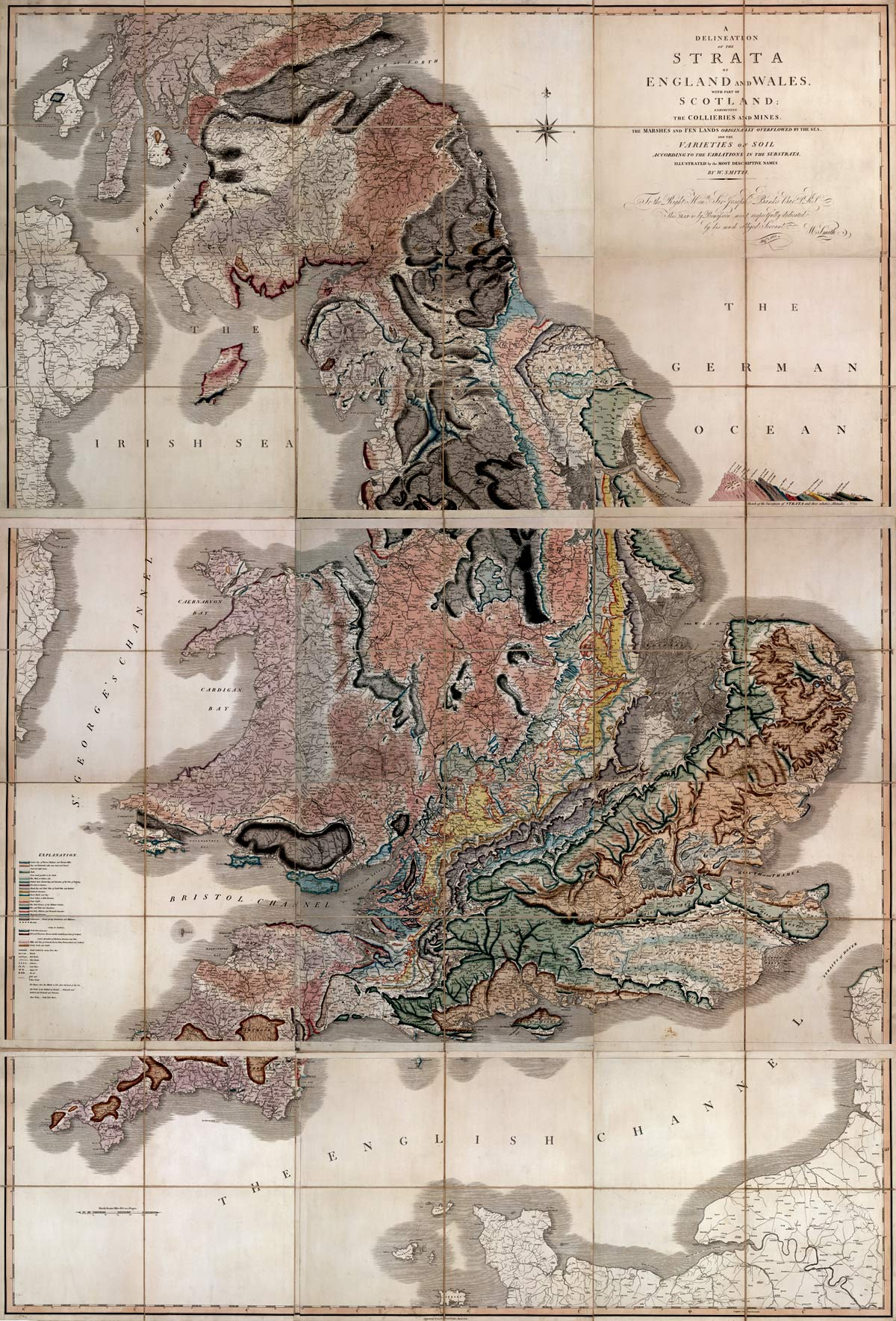
William Smith's 1815 map 'A delineation of the Strata of England and Wales, with part of Scotland.'

In 1801, he drew a rough sketch of what would become the first geological map of most of Great Britain. In the same year he claimed that a book he proposed to publish would provide geological information to enable the canal engineer to "choose his stratum, find the most appropriate materials, avoid slippery ground, or remedy the evil". The book was never published however. Smith travelled extensively across Great Britain working as a mineral surveyor allowing him to meet prominent people such as Thomas Coke, 1st Earl of Leicester, and the Duke of Bedford.

In 1815, Smith published his geological map, coloured on an especially prepared base map by John Cary at a scale of 5 miles to the inch and titled 'A delineation of the Strata of England and Wales, with part of Scotland.' While this was not the world's first geological map (a map of the United States by William Maclure was published six years earlier), Smith's was the first geological map covering such a large area in detail, and is one of the first stratigraphical analyses to utilize palaeontological indices. Conventional symbols were used to mark canals, tunnels, tramways and roads, collieries, lead, copper and tin mines, together with salt and alum works. The various geological strata were indicated by different colours, applied to the map by hand. Smith used a graded colouring method applying a bolder colour to the edge representing the base of each stratum, thus depicting its stratigraphical relations. The map is similar to modern geological maps of England (albeit today's maps use flat-colouring) reflecting its general accuracy in the eastern and south eastern regions of the country. However Smith's geology of western part of England and Wales was much less detailed and accurate. Smith included a 'Sketch of the succession of STRATA and their relative Altitudes' on the map, showing the disposition of strata from London to the mountains of Snowdonia. This was not a new technique in itself, but its appearance on a map, with the clear intention of illustrating the relationship between relief and rocks and their structure, was novel.

In his book Strata Identified by Organized Fossils (London 1816–1819), Smith recognised that strata contained distinct fossil assemblages which could be used to match rocks across regions. In 1817, he drew a remarkable geological section from Snowdon to London, a development of the ‘sketch' on his map, illustrating the three-dimensional relationship between geology and landscape via a perspective sketch of the landscape showing the topography. Effectively this was the first block diagram, now routinely used in geography textbooks and animations.

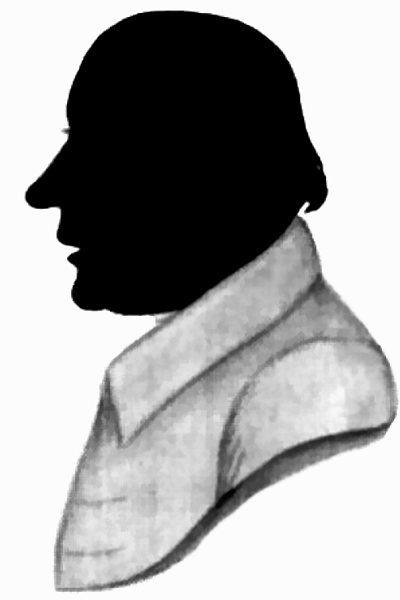
Silhouette of Smith, 1833

A common narrative in some recent accounts of Smith's life and his map asserts that rivalry built up between Smith and the first President of the Geological Society, George Bellas Greenough, who was also engaged in producing a geological map of England and Wales. However original sources point to this narrative not being the case and indicate Smith was used by John Farey Sr., another 'practical man' (i.e. mineral surveyor), to prosecute Farey's own grievances against the Geological Society in an article in The Philosophical Magazine by which he both started and fuelled the story that Smith was disrespected and there was ill-feeling towards him by the Geological Society men and Greenough in particular. In the following issue Greenough replied, publicly declaring his view as being non-antagonistic by stating:

Your correspondent considers me, in common with many other persons, actuated by feelings of hostility towards Mr. Smith. Now my feelings towards that gentleman are directly the reverse. I respect him for the important services he has rendered to geology, and I esteem him for the example of dignity, meekness, modesty, and candour, which he continually, though ineffectually, exhibits to his self-appointed champion.

Another common but misleading narrative in some recent accounts of Smith's map has Greenough's 1820 map undercutting the price and sales of Smith's map, thereby citing Greenough as a primary cause of landing Smith in debtor's prison. However, Greenough's map could not have contributed to the debts for which Smith was consigned to prison as the Greenough map, although dated 1819 on the map, was not published until May 1820, after Smith's incarceration. In fact Smith's maps retailed at 5 guineas, which was the same price as that privileged to Geological Society members for purchase of the Greenough 1820 map. However the Greenough map retailed to public at 6 guineas, thereby being a more expensive purchase than Smith's map. Also, although neither map sold well, the number of sales of Smith's map appears to have topped those of Greenough's map (only 196 copies recorded as sold) and there are only 15 names in common between Smith's subscribers' list and the list of those who bought the Geological Society's map.

Smith's various projects, starting with a mortgage taken to purchase his estate at Tucking Mill in Somerset in 1798, accrued financial commitments that ran into a series of difficulties which he managed to withstand by borrowing money from sympathetic creditors and mortgagors and funding repayments by taking on a relentless schedule of work commissions between 1801 and 1819. However a project to quarry Bath Stone near his property, for sale to the London property development market, failed to return the significant investment it had required due to poor quality stone and Smith found himself in default to co-investor Charles Conolly. Smith had used his Bath estate as security against Conolly's loan but there was excess to pay. In attempting to stave off his debt Smith sold his 'fossil collection' to the British Museum for £700, but this proved insufficient and funds fell short of the sum owed to Conolly by £300 and as a consequence Smith was sent to debtors' prison in 1819. Through all this financial turmoil, Smith managed to publish his map and subsequent associated publications but in 1817 he remarked "My income is as yet not anywise improved by what has been done, the profits being required to liquidate the debt incurred by publication."

On 31 August 1819, Smith was released from King's Bench Prison in London, a debtor's prison. He returned to 15 Buckingham Street, his home since 1804, to find a bailiff at the door and his home and property seized. Smith then worked as an itinerant surveyor for many years until one of his employers, Sir John Johnstone, recognised his work and talent and took steps to gain for him the respect he deserved, appointing Smith as Land Steward to his estate in Hackness near Scarborough. Between 1824 and 1834, Smith lived and was based in Hackness, then moving to Scarborough where he was responsible for the design of the Rotunda, a geological museum devoted to the Yorkshire coast, creating the cylindrical layout and arrangement of fossil display on sloping shelves.

== Later recognition ==
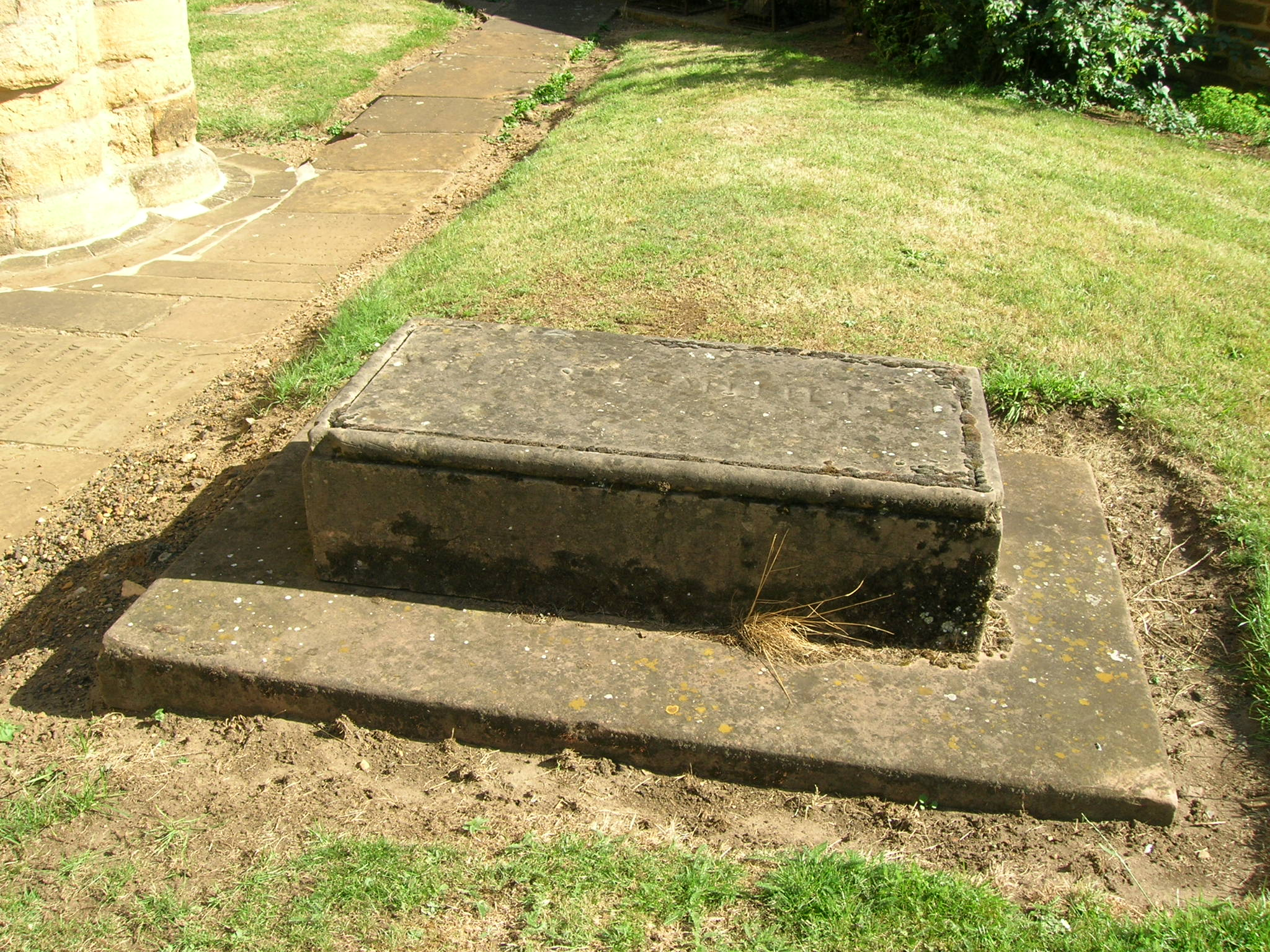
William Smith's grave adjoining St Peter's Church, Northampton

It was not until February 1831 that the Geological Society of London conferred on Smith the first Wollaston Medal in recognition of his achievement. It was on this occasion that the President, Adam Sedgwick, referred to Smith as "the Father of English Geology". That year Smith was awarded a pension of £100 a year by King William IV. In 1835 Smith travelled to Dublin for the meeting of the British Association, and there unexpectedly received an honorary Doctorate of Laws (LL.D.) from Trinity College.

In 1838, Smith was appointed as one of the commissioners to select building-stone for the new Palace of Westminster. He died in Northampton on 28 August 1839, aged 70, and is buried a few feet from the west tower of St Peter's Church, Northampton, now a redundant church. The inscription on the grave is badly worn but the name "William Smith" can just be seen. Inside St Peter's Church is an impressive bust and inscription.

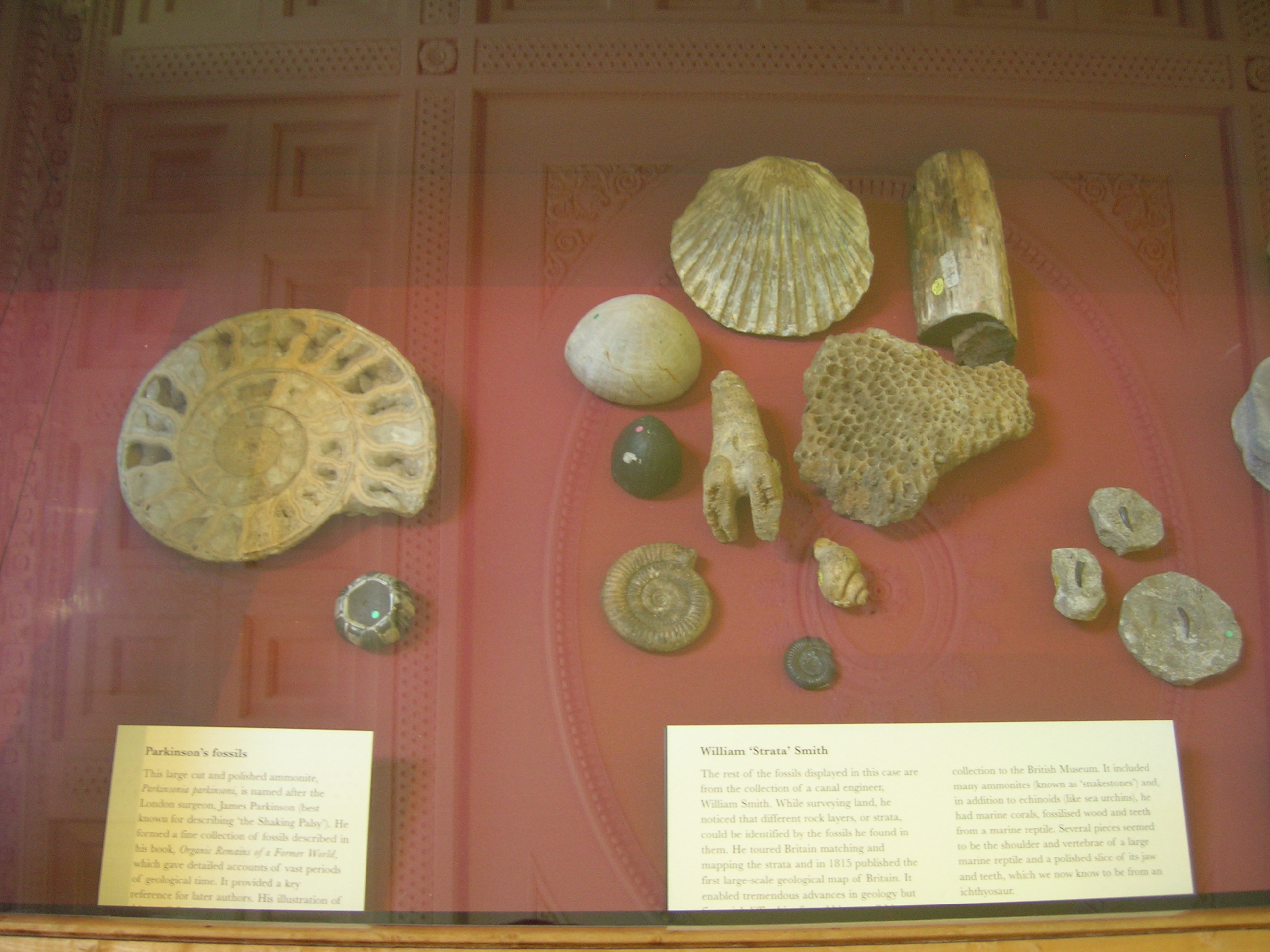
William Smith's fossil collection (right) that helped him produce the first geological map, on display in the British Museum

Subsequent modern geological maps have been based on Smith's original work, of which several copies have survived including one which has been put on display (alongside the Greenough map) at the Geological Society of London which can be visited by the public, free and without an appointment.

By 1841, the Institution of Civil Engineers had begun to promote the use of geological models in the design of civil engineering projects, with Smith's work and status as "Father of Geology" referenced by Thomas Sopwith in an address to the Institution that year.

== See also ==
- The Map that Changed the World, a biography of Smith by Simon Winchester
- Geology of Great Britain
- Succession (geology)

== Other sources ==
- John Diemer (editor), Special Issue from the William Smith Map Bicentenary Meeting sponsored by the History of Geology Group and held at the Geological Society London, 23–24 April 2015. Earth Sciences History, Volume 25, No. 1. Online ISSN 1944-6187
- John L. Morton, Strata (New Edition, 2004), Horsham: Brocken Spectre Publishing. ISBN 0-9546829-1-2
- Simon Winchester, The Map That Changed the World: William Smith and the Birth of Modern Geology, (2001), New York: HarperCollins, ISBN 0-14-028039-1
- John Phillips, Memoirs of William Smith (1844, republished with additional material by Hugh Torrens, 2003 ISBN 0-9544941-0-5).
- Hugh Torrens, "In Commemoration of the 150th anniversary of the death of William Smith (1769–1839)"
- William Smith's Private Papers, Oxford University
