= Outposts: Journeys to the Surviving Relics of the British Empire =

1985 book by Simon Winchester

Outposts: Journeys to the surviving relics of the British Empire
- First edition
- Author: Simon Winchester
- Language: English
- Genre: Travel literature
- Publisher: Hodder & Stoughton (UK)
- Publication date: 1985
- Publication place: England
- Media type: Print
- Pages: 362 pp (second edition, paperback)
- ISBN: 0141011890
- OCLC: 56458990

Outposts: Journeys to the surviving relics of the British Empire is a book by Simon Winchester. It details his travels to each of the remaining dependencies of the British Empire and was first published in 1985 in Britain by Hodder and Stoughton under the title Outposts and in the United States by Prentice Hall as The Sun Never Sets: Travels to the Remaining Outposts of the British Empire. It was reprinted in 2003 with a new foreword written to address the changing political climate and attitudes in relation to the British Empire, most importantly concerning the handover of Hong Kong to China and, more generally, the rise of globalism.

== Publication history ==
- Outposts: Journeys to the Surviving Relics of the British Empire (1985), Hodder & Stoughton
- The Sun Never Sets: Travels to the Remaining Outposts of the British Empire (1985), Prentice Hall
- Outposts: Journeys to the Surviving Relics of the British Empire revised ed. (2003), Penguin
