= The Map that Changed the World =

2001 book by Simon Winchester

- First edition
- Author: Simon Winchester
- Language: English
- Subject: William Smith
- Genre: Non-fiction
- Publisher: Penguin/Viking
- Publication date: 2001

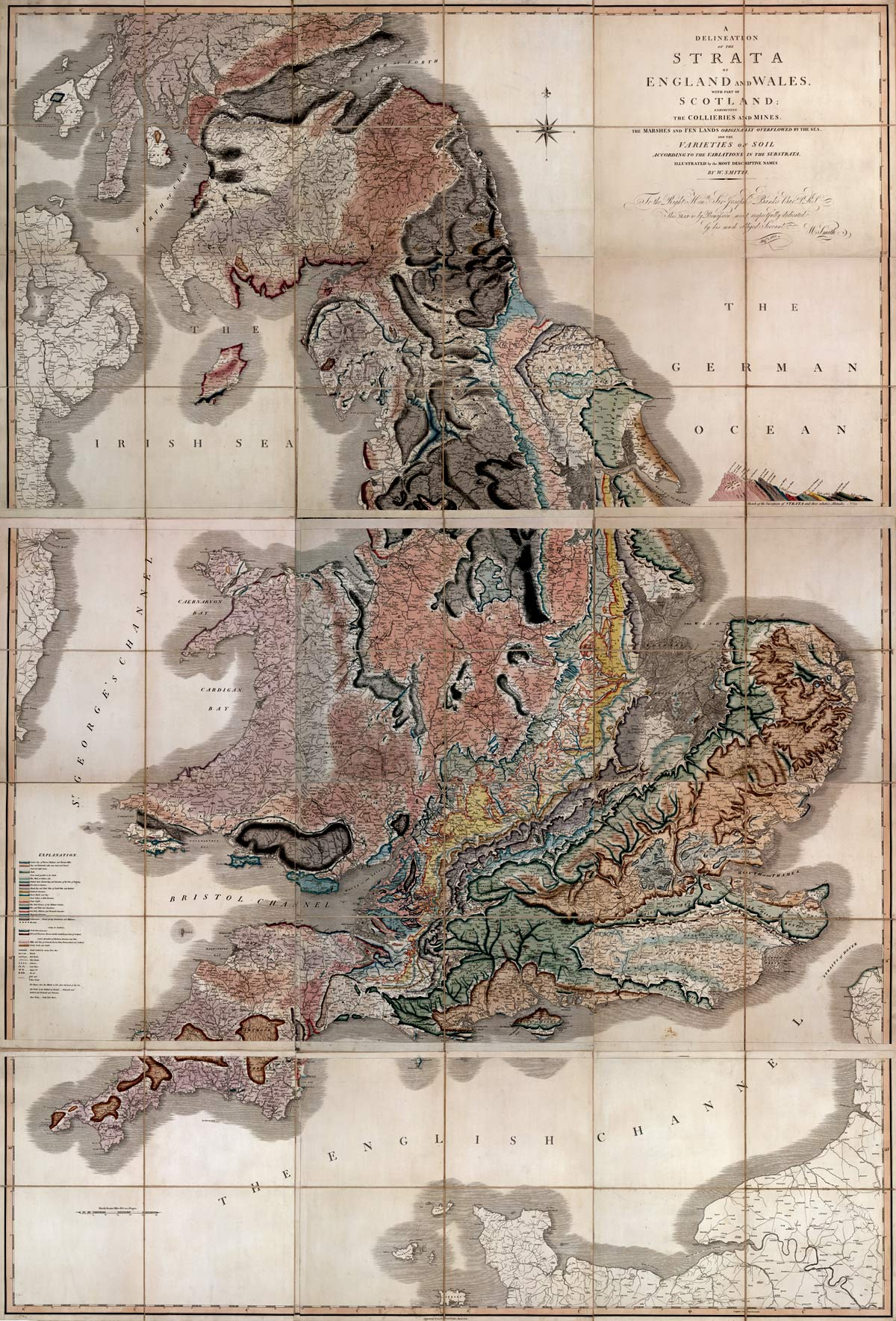
Smith's 1815 geological map of part of Great Britain

The Map that Changed the World is a 2001 book by Simon Winchester about English geologist William Smith and his creation in 1815 of the first geological map of England, Wales and southern Scotland, by far the most accurate of its time.

== Contents ==
The book narrates the intellectual context of the period, the development of Smith's ideas and how they contributed to the theory of evolution and more generally to a realisation of the true age of the Earth. It describes the social, economic and industrial context for Smith's insights and work, including the importance of coal mining and the transport of coal by means of canals.

Smith's pivotal insights were that each local sequence of rock strata was a subsequence of a single universal sequence of strata and that these rock strata could be distinguished and traced for great distances by means of embedded fossilised organisms.

Related topics, such as the founding of the Geological Society of London, are included. Smith's map was published by John Cary, a leading map publisher. Winchester describes the practice of publishing at the time as well as the system of debtor's prisons through his account of the sojourn of Smith in the King's Bench Prison.
