= The River at the Center of the World =

1996 book by Simon Winchester

- Author: Simon Winchester
- Language: English
- Genre: Travel literature
- Publisher: Henry Holt
- Publication date: 1996
- Publication place: England
- Media type: Print
- Pages: 410 pp (first edition, hardcover)
- ISBN: 0-8050-3888-4
- OCLC: 34411014
- Dewey Decimal: 915.1/20459 20
- LC Class: DS793.Y3 W56 1996

The River at the Center of the World: A Journey Up the Yangtze, and Back in Chinese Time is a book by Simon Winchester. It details his travels up the Yangtze river in China and was first published in 1996.

Viewing an ancient Chinese painting scroll drawn by Wang Hui gives the author the inspiration on how to structure his book. He starts his journey in Shanghai, at the Yangtze river's delta, and makes his way upriver to the headwaters. Meanwhile, his narration also takes a journey to the past, writing about contemporary times in Shanghai and Nanjing, and discussing events that date back increasingly further in cities upriver.

He makes the travel with a companion — a Chinese woman who is referred to in the book only as Lily to protect her identity. The chapter titled A New Great Wall is devoted to the Three Gorges Dam, then under construction and fully operational as of 2012.
