= Michael Proffitt =

Scottish/English lexicographer

Michael Proffitt is the eighth chief editor for the Oxford English Dictionary. Brought up in Edinburgh, Proffitt attended the University of Oxford, where he studied English language and literature. After graduation, Proffitt took a job with the O.E.D. in 1989. While at the O.E.D, he managed the new words program for a decade, and between 2003 and 2005 worked on the "Pasadena project" as part of a team that developed a new editing system for the project. Prior to his appointment as chief editor, he worked as project director, managing a large editorial team and prioritizing work.
