= William Chester Minor =

American surgeon and lexicographer (1834–1920)

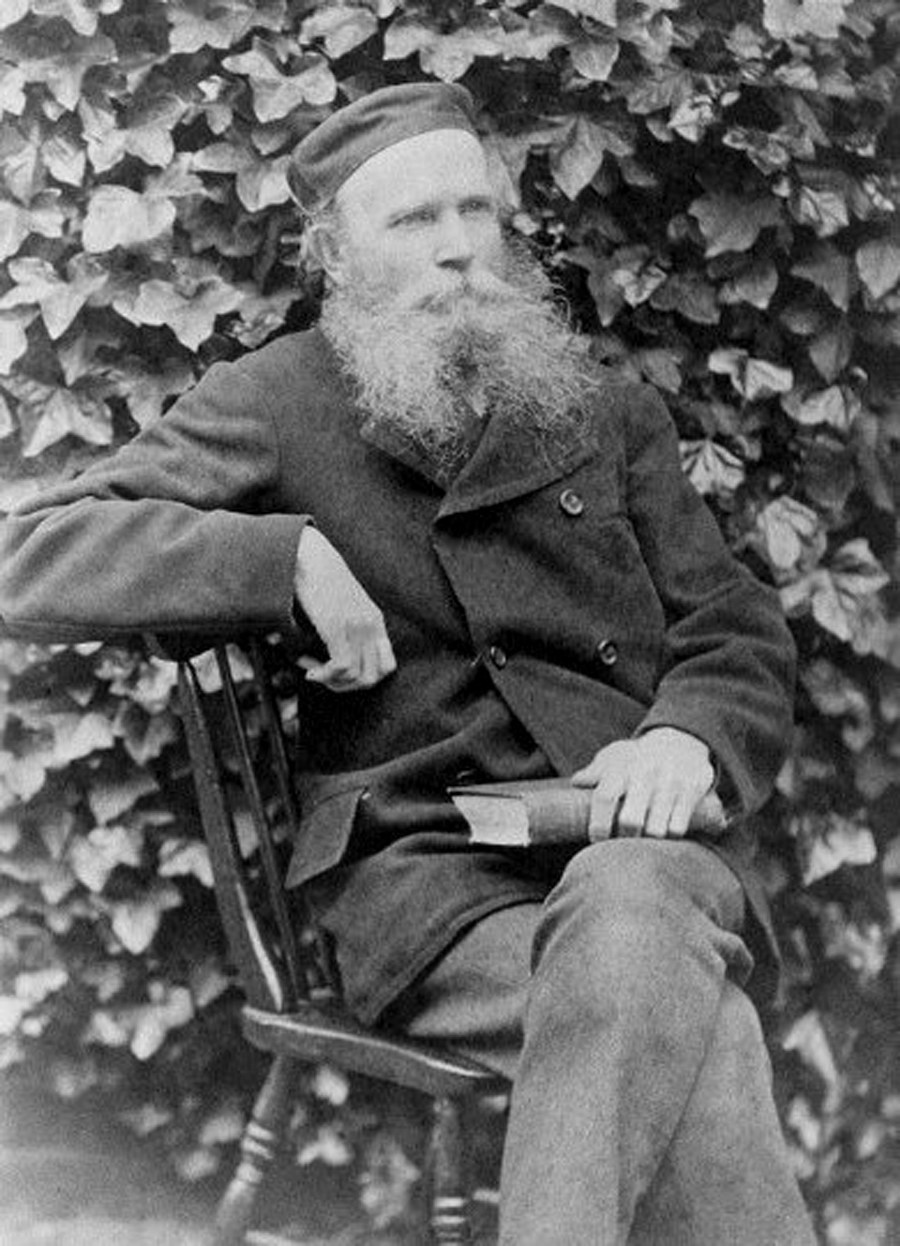
- Minor c. 1900
- Born: June 22, 1834; Ceylon
- Died: March 26, 1920 (aged 85); Hartford, Connecticut, US
- Education: Yale University
- Known for: Contributions to the Oxford English Dictionary
- Relatives: Thomas T. Minor (half-brother)
- Military career
- Allegiance: Union (United States)
- Branch: Union Army
- Service years: 1863/1864 to 1871
- Rank: Commissioned officer (surgeon)
- Conflicts: Battle of the Wilderness

William Chester Minor (22 June 1834 – 26 March 1920) was an American army surgeon, psychiatric hospital patient, and lexicographical researcher.

After serving in the Union Army during the American Civil War, Minor moved to England. Affected by delusions, he shot a man who he believed had broken into his room, and was consequently committed from 1872 to 1910 to a secure British psychiatric hospital.

While incarcerated, Minor became an important contributor to the Oxford English Dictionary. He was one of the project's most effective volunteers, reading through his large personal library of antiquarian books and compiling quotations that illustrated how particular words were used.

In 1910, responding to protests about Minor's treatment, Winston Churchill, then British home secretary, ordered Minor deported to the United States. Minor was hospitalized in Connecticut, where he died in 1920.

== Early life ==
Minor was born in Ceylon (now Sri Lanka), the son of Eastman Strong Minor and his first wife, Lucy Bailey. His parents were Congregational church missionaries from New England. He had numerous half-siblings, among them Thomas T. Minor, mayor of Seattle, Washington. At age 14, he was sent to the United States, where he lived with relatives in New Haven while attending Hopkins Grammar School. He subsequently enrolled at the Yale School of Medicine, supporting himself during his years as a medical student with part-time employment as an instructor at the Russell Academy and as an assistant on the 1864 revision of Webster's Dictionary, then in preparation at Yale under the supervision of Noah Porter. Minor graduated in 1863 with a medical degree and a specialization in comparative anatomy. After a brief stint at Knight General Hospital in New Haven he joined the Union Army.

== Military career ==
He was accepted by the Union Army as a surgeon and may have served at the Battle of the Wilderness in May 1864, which was notable for the terrible casualties suffered by both sides. There is an unverified story of Minor also being given the task of punishing an Irish soldier in the Union Army by branding him on the face with a D for "deserter" and that this incident later played a role in Minor's delusions. Historians disagree as to whether the Union Army used branding as a punishment for desertion, which means that the story may be fabricated. Moreover, it is unlikely Minor was present at the Battle of the Wilderness, which took place May 5–7, 1864, since his military records place him at Knight USA Hospital in New Haven at that time and do not show him arriving at 2 Division Hospital USA at Alexandria, Virginia, until May 17.

After the end of the Civil War, Minor saw duty in New York City. He was strongly attracted to the red-light district of the city and devoted much of his off-duty time to consorting with prostitutes. By 1867, his behavior had come to the attention of the army and he was transferred to a remote post in the Florida Panhandle. By 1868, his condition had progressed to the point that he was admitted to St. Elizabeths Hospital, a lunatic asylum (as mental health hospitals were then called) in Washington, D.C. After 18 months he showed no improvement.

== Move to England and the killing of Merrett ==
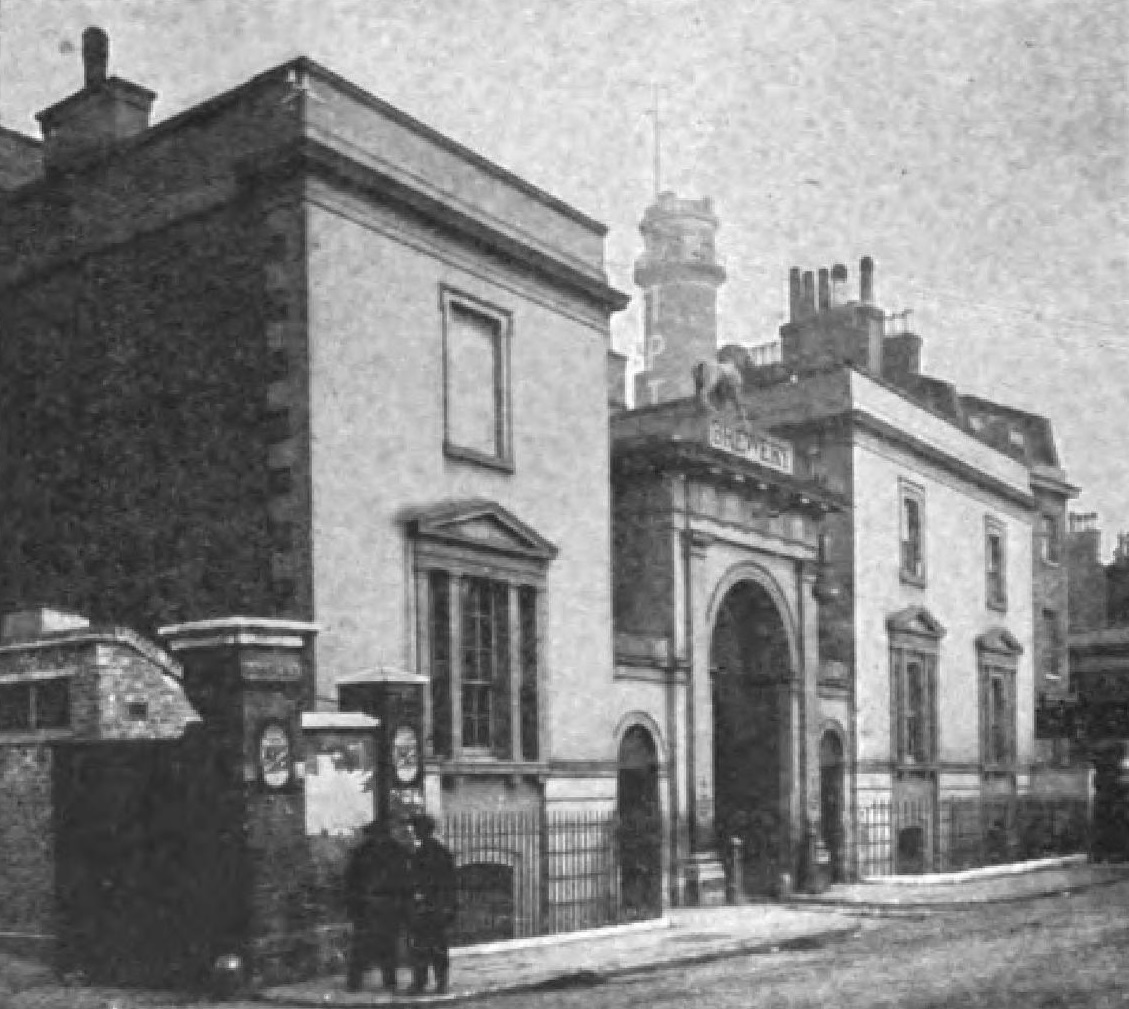
The "Lion Brewery" where Minor shot George Merrett

In 1871, Minor went to London for a change of pace to help his mental condition. In 1872, he was living in Tenison Street, Lambeth, where once again he took up a dissolute life. On February 17, 1872, haunted by his paranoia, he fatally shot George Merrett, whom Minor wrongly believed to have broken into his room. Merrett had been on his way to work to support his family: six children and his pregnant wife, Eliza.

After a pre-trial period spent in London's Horsemonger Lane Gaol, Minor was found not guilty by reason of insanity and incarcerated at the asylum in Broadmoor in the village of Crowthorne, Berkshire. As he had his US Army pension and was judged not dangerous, he was given rather comfortable quarters and was able to buy and read books.

== Contributor to the Oxford English Dictionary ==
It was probably through his correspondence with the London booksellers that he heard of the call for volunteers for what was to become the Oxford English Dictionary (OED). He devoted most of the remainder of his life to that work. He became one of the project's most effective volunteers, reading through his large personal library of antiquarian books and compiling quotations that illustrated the way particular words were used. He was often visited by the widow of the man he had killed, and she provided him with further books. The compilers of the dictionary published lists of words for which they wanted examples of usage. Minor provided these with increasing ease as the lists grew. It was many years before the OED's editor, James Murray, learned of Minor's history and visited him in January 1891 (as well as many times thereafter). In 1899, Murray paid compliment to Minor's enormous contributions to the dictionary, stating, "we could easily illustrate the last four centuries from his quotations alone".

== Self-mutilation, decline, and death ==
Minor's condition deteriorated. In 1902, he was suffering delusions that he was being abducted nightly from his rooms and conveyed to such distant places as Istanbul, where he was forced to commit sexual assaults on children. He cut off his own penis (autopenectomy) to prevent such actions. He used a knife he otherwise used in his work on the dictionary. His health continued to worsen and, after Murray campaigned on his behalf, Minor was released in 1910 on the orders of the then Home Secretary, 35 year-old Winston Churchill.

Minor was deported back to the United States and resided at St. Elizabeths Hospital. There, he was diagnosed with schizophrenia. In 1919, he was moved to the Retreat for the Elderly Insane (now called The Institute of Living) in Hartford, Connecticut, where he died in 1920.

== In popular culture ==
In July 1915, the Washington D.C. Sunday Star published a "sensationalized" story beginning with the line "American Murderer Helped Write Oxford Dictionary". The book The Surgeon of Crowthorne (published in America as The Professor and the Madman), by Simon Winchester, was published in 1998 and chronicles both Minor's later life and his contributions to the creation of the Oxford English Dictionary. A movie based on the book, called The Professor and the Madman, starring Mel Gibson as Murray and Sean Penn as Minor, was released in May 2019.

Minor's life was also detailed in an episode of Drunk History. He was portrayed by Bob Odenkirk.
