= Simon Winchester =

British and American journalist and author (1944–2026)

Simon Winchester OBE
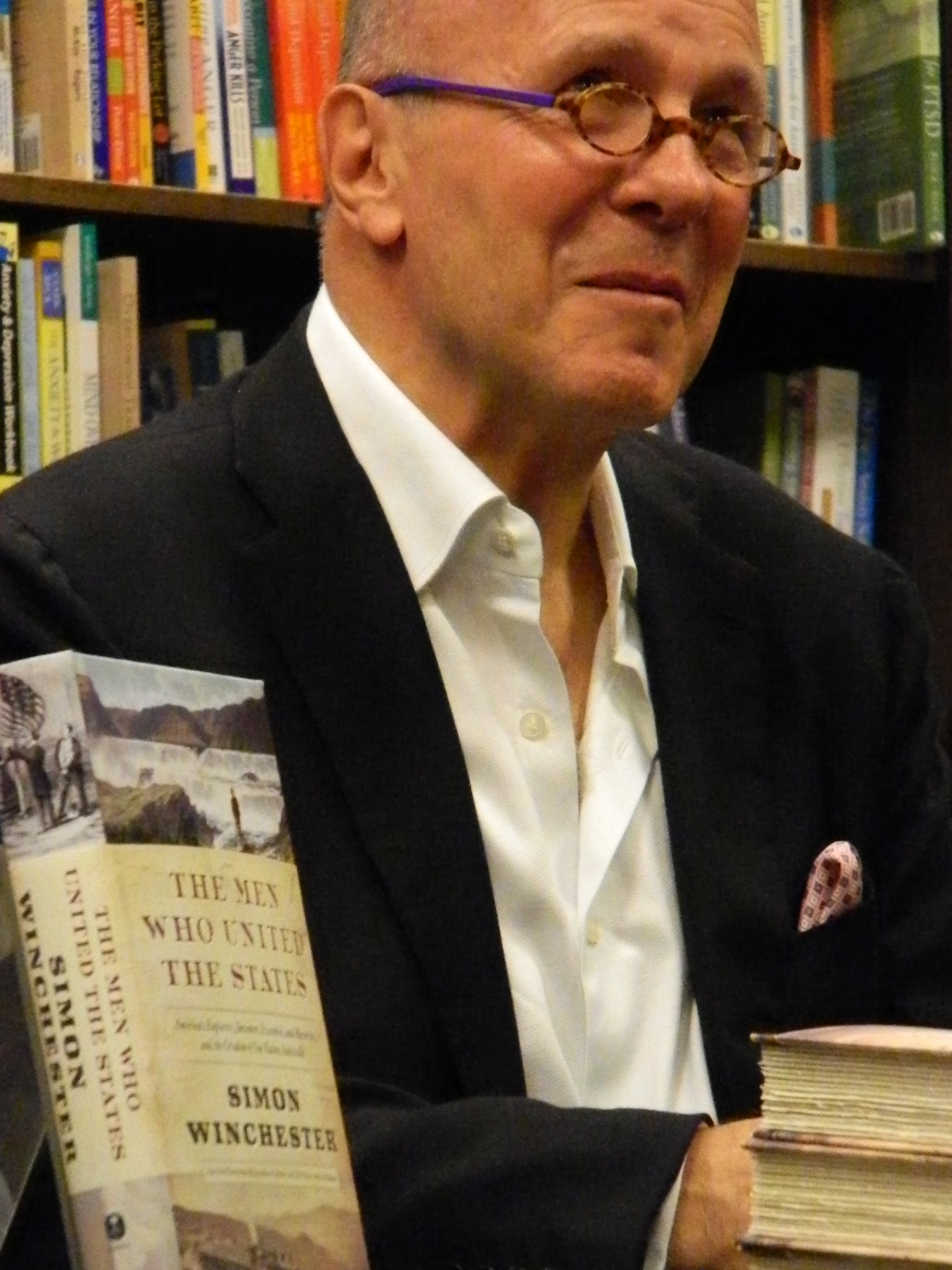
- Winchester in 2013
- Born: 28 September 1944; London, England
- Died: 3 November 2026 (aged 82); Sandisfield, Massachusetts, US
- Education: University of Oxford
- Occupations: Journalist; author
- Spouse(s): Catherine Evans (div.); Setsuko Winchester
- Website: simonwinchester.com

Simon Bernard Adrian Winchester (28 September 1944 – 3 November 2026) was a British and naturalised American author and journalist. During his career at The Guardian newspaper, Winchester covered numerous significant events, including Bloody Sunday and the Watergate Scandal. He wrote or contributed to over 30 best-selling nonfiction books, one novel, and several magazines, among them Condé Nast Traveler, Smithsonian Magazine, and National Geographic. His breakthrough book was The Surgeon of Crowthorne (1998), published in North America as The Professor and the Madman.

== Early life and education ==
Born in London to Bernard and Andrée (de Wael) Winchester, Simon attended several boarding schools in Dorset, including Hardye's School. He spent a year hitchhiking around the United States, then in 1963 went up to St Catherine's College, Oxford, to study geology. He graduated in 1966, and found work with Falconbridge Nickel Mines, a Canadian mining company. His first assignment was to work as a field geologist searching for copper deposits in Uganda.

== Career ==
While on assignment in Uganda, Winchester happened upon a copy of James Morris's Coronation Everest, an account of the 1953 expedition that led to the first successful ascent of Mount Everest. The book instilled in Winchester the desire to be a writer, so he wrote to Morris seeking career advice. Morris urged Winchester to give up geology the same day he received the letter and get a job as a writer on a newspaper.

In 1969, Winchester joined The Guardian, first as a regional correspondent based in Newcastle upon Tyne and later as its Northern Ireland correspondent. Winchester's time in Northern Ireland placed him around several events of The Troubles, including the events of Bloody Sunday and the Belfast "Hour of Terror". In 1971, Winchester became involved in a controversy over the British press's coverage of Northern Ireland when Bernadette Devlin described, on the floor of the House of Commons, his role in reporting the shooting to death by British soldiers of Barney Watt on Hooker Street on the morning of 6 February 1971.

After leaving Northern Ireland in 1972, Winchester was briefly assigned to Calcutta before becoming a correspondent for The Guardian in Washington, DC, where he covered news ranging from the end of Richard Nixon's administration to the start of Jimmy Carter's presidency.

In 1982, while working as chief foreign feature writer for The Sunday Times, Winchester was on location for the invasion of the Falkland Islands by Argentine forces. Suspected of being a spy, Winchester was held for three months as a prisoner in Ushuaia, Tierra del Fuego. He wrote about this event in his book Prison Diary (1983) and also in Outposts: Journeys to the Surviving Relics of the British Empire (1985) as well as Atlantic: A Vast Ocean of a Million Stories (2010), in which he tells of meeting up with one of his jailers many years later. In 1985, he shifted to working as a freelance writer and travelled to Hong Kong. When Condé Nast re-branded Signature magazine as Condé Nast Traveler, Winchester was appointed its Asia-Pacific editor. Over the following 15 years he contributed to a number of travel publications including theTraveler, National Geographic and Smithsonian magazines.

Winchester's first book, In Holy Terror, was published by Faber and Faber in 1975. The book drew heavily on his experiences of the turmoil in Northern Ireland. In 1976 he published his second book, American Heartbeat, which deals with his travels through the American heartland. Winchester's first major popular success was The Surgeon of Crowthorne (1998) which became a New York Times best seller under its North American title The Professor and the Madman.

Though he still wrote travel books, Winchester used the narrative non-fiction form he adopted for The Professor and the Madman several more times, resulting in multiple best-selling books. The Map that Changed the World (2001) focuses on the geologist William Smith and was Winchester's second New York Times best seller. The year 2003 saw the publication of The Meaning of Everything, which returns to the topic of the creation of the Oxford English Dictionary, and of the best-selling Krakatoa: The Day the World Exploded (Viking Press]). Winchester then published A Crack in the Edge of the World, a book about San Francisco's 1906 earthquake. The Man Who Loved China (2008) retells the life of the scholar Joseph Needham. The Alice Behind Wonderland, an exploration of the life and work of Charles Lutwidge Dodgson (Lewis Carroll), and his relationship with Alice Liddell, was published in 2011.

Winchester's book on the Pacific Ocean, Pacific: Silicon Chips and Surfboards, Coral Reefs and Atom Bombs, Brutal Dictators, Fading Empires, and the Coming Collision of the World's Superpowers, was published in 2015. It was his second book about the Pacific region, his first, Pacific Rising: The Emergence of a New World Culture having been published in 1991. Before this, in the mid-1980s, Winchester managed to set foot on the secretive island of Diego Garcia (which is the largest island of the Chagos Archipelago in the British Indian Ocean Territory). Winchester pretended that his boat had run into trouble next to the island, and remained in the bay for about two days. He managed to step on shore briefly before being escorted away, and was told by British authorities: "Go away and don't come back."

== Personal life and death ==
On 4 July 2011, Winchester was naturalized as an American citizen in a ceremony aboard the USS Constitution. With his wife Setsuko, he had three children. Winchester lived in Berkshire County, Massachusetts. He was the founder, editor and reporter of the Sandisfield Times, a hyper-local newspaper focused on issues in the small Berkshires town.

Simon Winchester died from a heart attack at his farm in Sandisfield, Massachusetts, on 3 November 2026, aged 82.

== Books ==
Title	Year	ISBN	Publisher	Subject matter	Interviews and presentations	Comments
In Holy Terror: Reporting the Ulster Troubles	1974	ISBN 9780571106288	Faber & Faber	The Troubles		
American Heartbeat: Notes From a Midwest Journey	1976	ISBN 9780571108787	Faber & Faber	Midwestern United States		
Their Noble Lordships: Class and Power in Modern Britain	1982	ISBN 9780394524184	Random House	Social class in the United Kingdom, British nobility		
Stones of Empire: The Buildings of the Raj	1983	ISBN 9780192114495	Oxford University Press	British colonial architecture in India		Text by Jan Morris; photographs by Winchester
Prison Diary: Argentina	1983	ISBN 9780701127534	Chatto & Windus			
Outposts: Journeys to the Surviving Relics of the British Empire	1985	ISBN 9780060598617	Hodder & Stoughton	British Overseas Territories		Also published under the title The Sun Never Sets.
Korea: A Walk Through the Land of Miracles	1988	ISBN 9780246133632	HarperCollins	South Korea		
Pacific Rising: The Emergence of a New World Culture	1991	ISBN 9780138077938	Simon & Schuster			
Hong Kong: Here Be Dragons	1992	ISBN 9781556702495	Stewart Tabori & Chang	Hong Kong		By Rich Browne, James Marshall and Simon Winchester.
Pacific Nightmare: How Japan Starts World War III : A Future History	1992	ISBN 9781559721363	Birch Lane Press			Fiction
Small World: A Global Photographic Project, 1987–94	1995	ISBN 9781899235056	Dewi Lewis Publishing			Written with Martin Parr.
The River at the Center of the World: A Journey Up the Yangtze, and Back in Chinese Time	1996	ISBN 9780274882915	Picador	Yangtze River		
The Surgeon of Crowthorne: A Tale of Murder, Madness and the Love of Words	1998	ISBN 9780140271287	Viking Press	William Chester Minor, Sir James Murray, Oxford English Dictionary	Booknotes interview with Winchester on The Professor and the Madman, 8 November 1998, C-SPAN	Published in the United States as The Professor and the Madman
The Fracture Zone: A Return to the Balkans	1999	ISBN 9780060195748	HarperCollins	Breakup of Yugoslavia, Yugoslav Wars	Presentation by Winchester on The Fracture Zone, 31 October 1999, C-SPAN	
The Map That Changed the World: William Smith and the Birth of Modern Geology	2001	ISBN 9780060193614	HarperCollins	William Smith	Presentation by Winchester on The Map That Changed the World, 7 September 2001, C-SPAN; Interview about The Map That Changed the World by Powell's Books, 10 October 2006	
The Meaning of Everything: The Story of the Oxford English Dictionary	2003	ISBN 9780198607021	Oxford University Press	Oxford English Dictionary	Presentation by Winchester on The Meaning of Everything, 20 November 2003, C-SPAN	
Krakatoa: The Day the World Exploded	2003	ISBN 9780060838591	HarperCollins	1883 eruption of Krakatoa	Presentation by Winchester on Krakatoa, 10 April 2003, C-SPAN	
Simon Winchester's Calcutta	2004	ISBN 9781740595872	Lonely Planet	Calcutta, India		A collection of writings about the Indian city, edited with his son Rupert Winchester.
A Crack in the Edge of the World: America and the Great California Earthquake of 1906	2005	ISBN 9780060572006	HarperCollins	1906 San Francisco earthquake	Presentation by Winchester on A Crack in the Edge of the World, 21 October 2005, C-SPAN; The Bat Segundo Show interview with Winchester on A Crack in the Edge of the World, 28 December 2006	
The Man Who Loved China: The Fantastic Story of the Eccentric Scientist Who Unlocked the Mysteries of the Middle Kingdom	2008	ISBN 9780060884611	HarperCollins	Joseph Needham	Presentation by Winchester on The Man Who Loved China, 20 May 2008, C-SPAN; Interview about Bomb, Book & Compass – The Life of Joseph Needham (transcript) by Ramona Koval, The Book Show, ABC Radio National, 3 October 2008	Title of the UK edition: Bomb, Book & Compass.
Atlantic: A Vast Ocean of a Million Stories	2010	ISBN 9780007341375	HarperCollins	History of the Atlantic Ocean	Presentation by Winchester on Atlantic, 4 November 2010, C-SPAN; Presentation by Winchester on Atlantic, 21 November 2010, C-SPAN; Interview about The Atlantic by Claudia Cragg, KGNU radio, 2 December 2010; Q&A interview with Winchester on Atlantic, 27 November 2011, C-SPAN	Also published under the title Atlantic: The Biography of an Ocean.
The Alice Behind Wonderland	2011	ISBN 9780190614546	Oxford University Press	Alice Liddell		
The Men Who United the States: America's Explorers, Inventors, Eccentrics and Mavericks, and the Creation of One Nation, Indivisible	2013	ISBN 9780062079619	HarperCollins		Presentation by Winchester on The Men Who United the States, 18 October 2013, C-SPAN; The Bat Segundo Show interview with Winchester on The Men Who United the States, 26 November 2013	
The Man with the Electrified Brain	2013	ISBN 9781614520832	Byliner			
When the Earth Shakes: Earthquakes, Volcanoes, and Tsunamis	2015	ISBN 9780670785360	Viking Books for Young Readers	Earthquakes, Volcanoes, and Tsunamis		
Pacific: Silicon Chips and Surfboards, Coral Reefs and Atom Bombs, Brutal Dictators, Fading Empires, and the Coming Collision of the World's Superpowers	2015	ISBN 9780062315410	HarperCollins	History of the Pacific Ocean	Presentation by Winchester on Pacific, 29 October 2015, C-SPAN	
The Perfectionists: How Precision Engineers Created the Modern World	2018	ISBN 9780062652553	HarperCollins	Precision engineering	Interview with Winchester on The Perfectionists, 17 November 2018, C-SPAN	Also published as Exactly: How Precision Engineers Created the Modern World.
Land: How the Hunger for Ownership Shaped the Modern World	2021	ISBN 9780062938336	HarperCollins	Land tenure	Interview with Winchester on Land, 17 February 2021, C-SPAN	
Knowing What We Know: The Transmission of Knowledge From Ancient Wisdom to Modern Magic	2023	ISBN 9780063142886	HarperCollins	Knowledge, Information Systems		
The Breath of the Gods: The History and Future of the Wind	2025	ISBN 9780063374454	HarperCollins	Wind		

== Honours ==
- Winchester was appointed an Officer of the Order of the British Empire for "services to journalism and literature" in Queen Elizabeth II's New Year Honours list of 2006.
- Winchester was named an honorary fellow of St Catherine's College, Oxford, in October 2009.
- Winchester received an honorary degree from Dalhousie University in Canada in October 2010.
- Winchester received the Lawrence J. Burpee Medal and was elected a fellow of the Royal Canadian Geographical Society in November 2016.
