= The Meaning of Everything =

2003 non-fiction history book by Simon Winchester

- Author: Simon Winchester
- Language: English
- Publisher: Oxford University Press
- Publication date: October 14, 2004
- Pages: 288
- ISBN: 978-0-19-517500-4

The Meaning of Everything: The Story of the Oxford English Dictionary is a 2003 book by Simon Winchester. It concerns the creation of the Oxford English Dictionary under the editorship of James Murray and others, one aspect of which Winchester had previously written about in 1998 in The Surgeon of Crowthorne: A Tale of Murder, Madness and the Love of Words.
