= The Surgeon of Crowthorne =

1998 history book by Simon Winchester

The Surgeon of Crowthorne: A Tale of Murder, Madness and the Love of Words
- First edition
- Author: Simon Winchester
- Language: English
- Genre: Non-fiction
- Publisher: Viking Press
- Publication date: 1998
- Publication place: United Kingdom

The Surgeon of Crowthorne: A Tale of Murder, Madness and the Love of Words is a non-fiction history book by British writer Simon Winchester, first published in the UK in 1998. It was retitled The Professor and the Madman: A Tale of Murder, Insanity, and the Making of the Oxford English Dictionary in the United States and Canada.

== Plot ==
The book tells the story of the making of the Oxford English Dictionary (OED) and one of its most prolific early contributors, William Chester Minor, a retired United States Army surgeon. Minor was, at the time, detained in the Broadmoor Criminal Lunatic Asylum, near the village of Crowthorne, in Berkshire, England.

The "professor" referred to in the North American title is Sir James Murray, the chief editor of the OED during most of the project. Murray was a talented linguist and had other scholarly interests, and had taught in schools and worked in banking. Faced with the enormous task of producing a comprehensive dictionary, with a quotation illustrating the uses of each meaning of each word, and with evidence for the earliest use of each, Murray enlisted the help of dozens of amateur philologists as volunteer researchers.

== History of creation ==
A journalist with three decades of experience, and the author of a dozen travel-inspired books, Winchester's initial proposal to write a book about an obscure lexicographer was originally met with rejection. Only when HarperCollins editor Larry Ashmead read the proposal and championed the book did Winchester pursue the necessary research in earnest. Of the project Ashmead said "we can make lexicography cool". It was Ashmead who persuaded Winchester to call the North American edition The Professor and the Madman (over Winchester's objection that Murray was not a professor), saying "No one here knows what the hell a Crowthorne is."

== Reception ==
The book was a major success. Winchester went on to write The Meaning of Everything: The Story of the Oxford English Dictionary (2003) about the broader history of the OED.

== Film adaptation ==
A film adaptation of the book, starring Mel Gibson as Murray and Sean Penn as Minor and directed by Farhad Safinia under the pseudonym P. B. Shemran, was released in 2019 with the title The Professor and the Madman. The movie rights for the book were bought by Gibson's Icon Productions in 1998. John Boorman wrote a script and was at one time tapped to direct, as was Luc Besson. Production began in 2016, but the release was delayed by legal disputes between parties in the film's production.

== Editions ==
- Winchester, Simon (1998). The Surgeon of Crowthorne: A Tale of Murder, Madness and the Love of Words (hardback ed.). UK: Viking. ISBN 0-670-87862-6.
- Winchester, Simon (1999). The Surgeon of Crowthorne: A Tale of Murder, Madness and the Oxford English Dictionary (paperback ed.). UK: Penguin. ISBN 0-14-027128-7.
- Winchester, Simon (1998). The Professor and the Madman: A Tale of Murder, Insanity, and the Making of the Oxford English Dictionary (hardback ed.). US: HarperCollins. ISBN 0-06-017596-6.
- Winchester, Simon (2000). Der Mann, der die Wörter liebte (in German). Goldmann. ISBN 978-3-442-72643-1.
- Winchester, Simon (2001). Le Fou et le Professeur (in French). Librairie générale française. ISBN 978-2-253-15082-4.
