= James Murray (lexicographer) =

Primary editor of the Oxford English Dictionary (1837–1915)

Sir James Murray
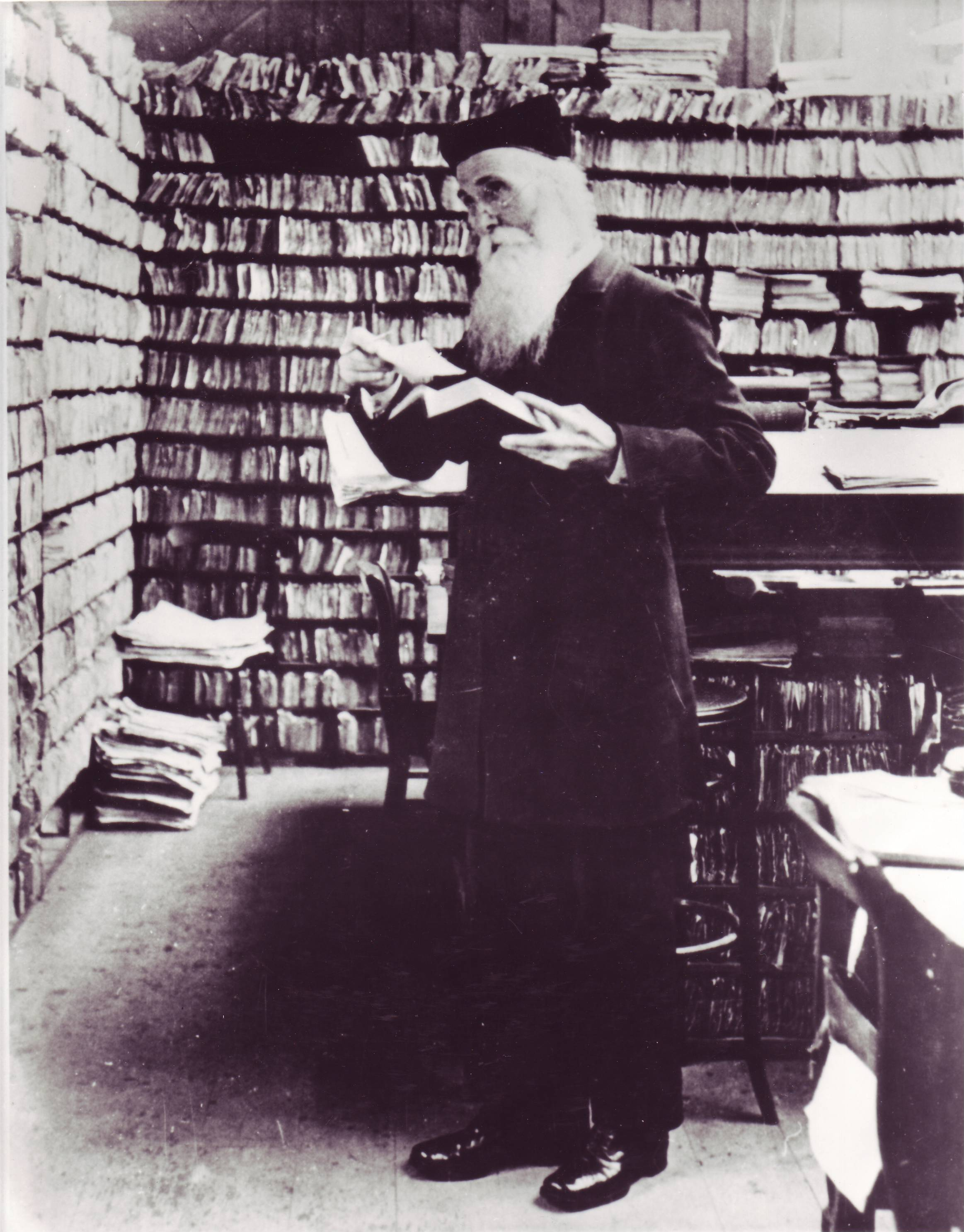
- Murray in the Scriptorium at Banbury Road, before 1910
- Born: James Murray; 7 February 1837; Denholm, Roxburghshire, Scotland
- Died: 26 July 1915 (aged 78); Oxford, England
- Occupations: Academic, lexicographer, philologist
- Spouses: Maggie Scott (m. 1862; died 1865); Ada Agnes Ruthven (m. 1867)
- Children: 11 (incl. Harold Murray, Oswyn Murray and Robert Murray)

Sir James Augustus Henry Murray, FBA (/ˈmʌri/; 7 February 1837 – 26 July 1915) was a British lexicographer and philologist. He was the primary editor of the Oxford English Dictionary (OED) from 1879 until his death.

== Life and learning ==
James Murray was born in the village of Denholm near Hawick in the Scottish Borders, the eldest son of a draper, Thomas Murray. His brothers included Charles Oliver Murray and A. D. Murray, later editor of the Newcastle Daily Journal. He was christened plain "James Murray", but in 1855 he assumed the extra names "Augustus Henry" in order to distinguish himself from other James Murrays in the Hawick area. A precocious child with a voracious appetite for learning, he left school at fourteen because his parents were not able to afford to pay the fees to continue his education. At seventeen he became a teacher at Hawick Grammar School (now Hawick High School) and three years later he was headmaster of the Subscription Academy there. In 1856, he was one of the founders of the Hawick Archaeological Society.

In 1861, Murray met a music teacher, Maggie Scott, whom he married the following year. Two years later, they had a daughter Anna, who soon died of tuberculosis, then known as consumption. Maggie, too, fell ill with the same disease, and on the advice of doctors, the couple moved to London to escape the Scottish winters. Once there, Murray took an administrative job with the Chartered Bank of India while continuing in his spare time to pursue his many and varied academic interests. Maggie died within a year of arrival in London. A year later Murray was engaged to Ada Agnes Ruthven and the following year he married her. Their best man was his friend Alexander Graham Bell, who had earlier received instruction from Murray in elementary electricity, and often referred to him as "the grandfather of the telephone".

By this time Murray was primarily interested in languages and etymology, the origin of words. Some idea of the depth and range of his linguistic erudition may be gained from a letter of application he wrote to Thomas Watts, Keeper of Printed Books at the British Museum, in which he claimed an "intimate acquaintance" with Italian, French, Catalan, Spanish, and Latin, and "to a lesser degree Portuguese, Vaudois, Provençal & various dialects". In addition, he was "tolerably familiar" with Dutch, German, and Danish. His studies of Anglo-Saxon and Mœso-Gothic had been "much closer", he knew "a little of the Celtic" and was at the time "engaged with the Slavonic, having obtained a useful knowledge of the Russian". He had "sufficient knowledge of Hebrew and Syriac to read and cite the Old Testament and Peshito" and to a lesser degree he knew Aramaic, Arabic, Coptic, and Phoenician. However, he did not get the job.

By 1869, Murray was on the council of the Philological Society, and by 1873 had given up his job at the bank and returned to teaching at Mill Hill School. He then published The Dialect of the Southern Counties of Scotland, which served to enhance his reputation in philological circles. In 1881, he was elected as a member of the American Philosophical Society.

Murray had eleven children with Ada (all having "Ruthven" in their name, by arrangement with his father-in-law, George Ruthven); the eldest, Harold James Ruthven Murray became a prominent chess historian, Sir Oswyn Murray was permanent secretary at the Admiralty (United Kingdom) from 1917 to 1936, Robert Murray was a Jesuit priest and specialist in Syriac, and Wilfrid George Ruthven Murray wrote an account of his father. All the eleven children survived to maturity (which was unusual at that time) and helped him in the compilation of the Oxford English Dictionary (OED).

He died of pleurisy on 26 July 1915 and requested to be buried in Oxford beside the grave of his best friend, James Legge.

== Murray and the OED ==
On 26 April 1878, Murray was invited to Oxford to meet the Delegates of the Oxford University Press, with a view to his taking on the job of editor of a new dictionary of the English language, to replace Johnson's Dictionary and to capture all the words then extant in the English speaking world in all their various shades of meaning.

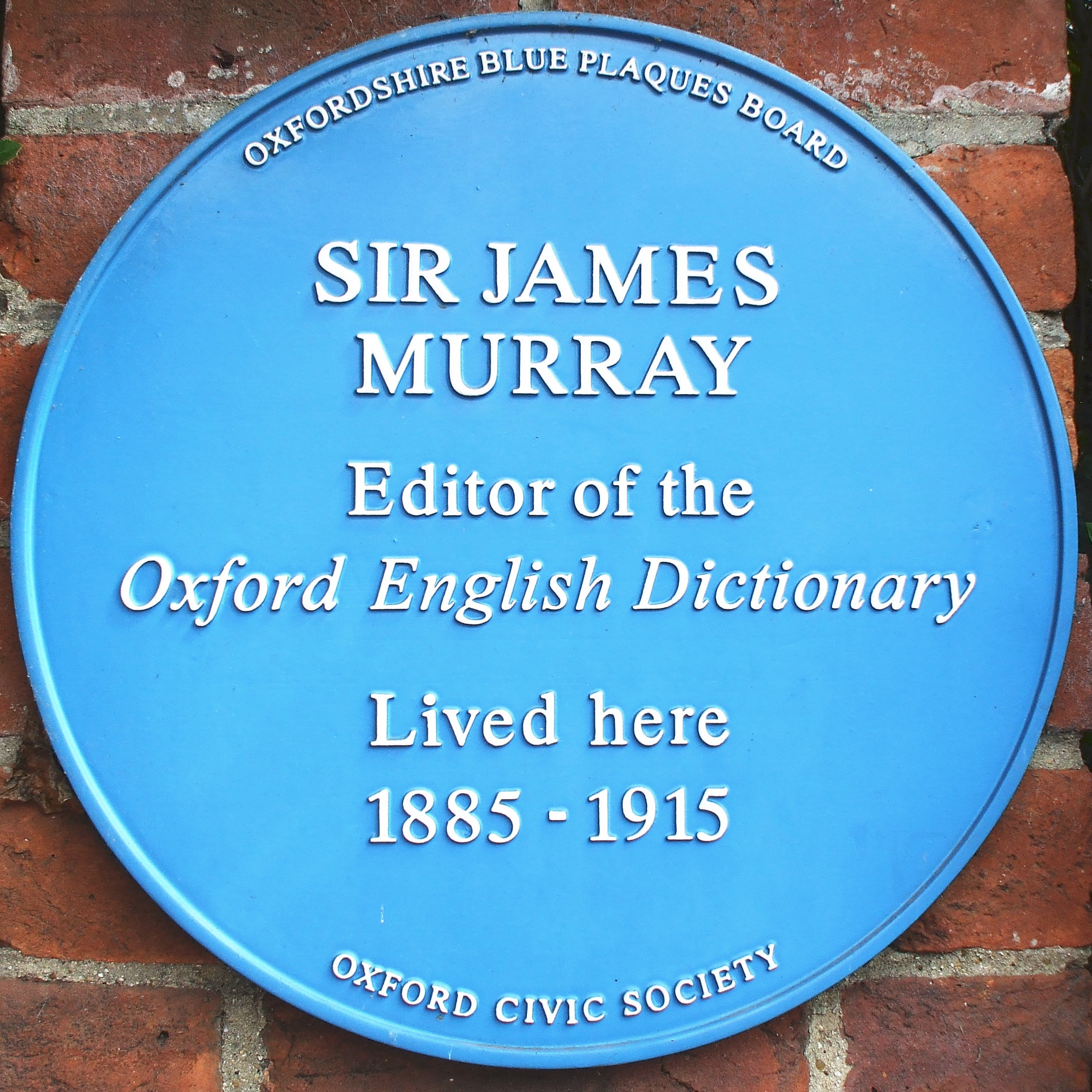
The blue plaque at 78 Banbury Road

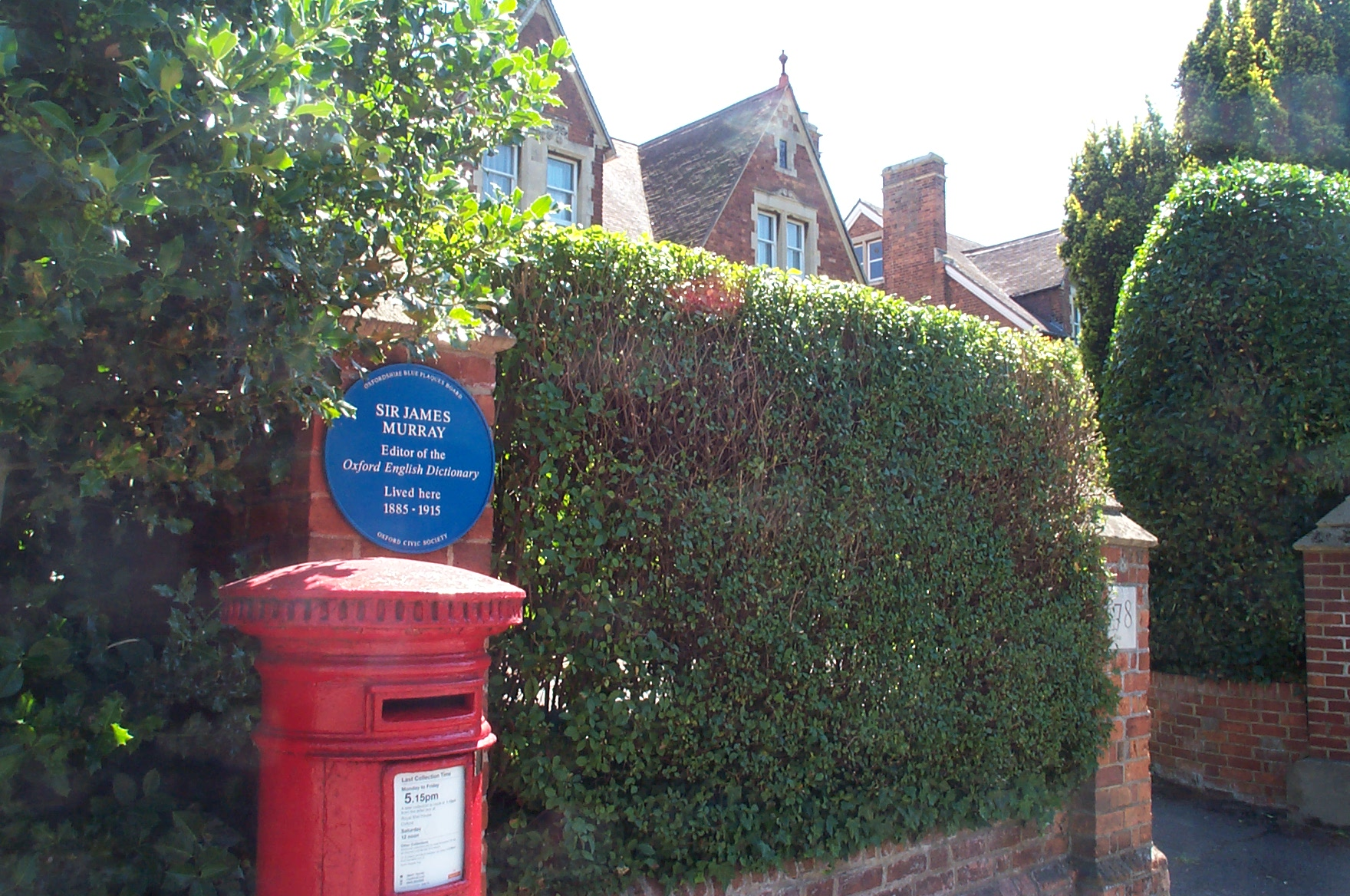
The erstwhile home of James Murray at 78 Banbury Road, Oxford: the blue plaque was installed in 2002.

On 1 March 1879, a formal agreement was put in place to the effect that Murray was to edit a new English Dictionary, which would eventually become the Oxford English Dictionary (OED). It was expected to take ten years to complete and be some 7,000 pages long, in four volumes. In fact, when the final results were published in 1928, it ran to twelve volumes, with 414,825 words defined and 1,827,306 citations employed to illustrate their meanings.

In preparation for the work ahead, Murray built a corrugated-iron shed in the grounds of Mill Hill School, called the Scriptorium, to house his small team of assistants as well as the flood of slips (bearing quotations illustrating the use of words to be defined in the dictionary) which started to flow in as a result of his appeal to the public for help with creating the dictionary. As work continued on the early part of the dictionary, Murray gave up his job as a teacher and became a full-time lexicographer.

In the summer of 1884, Murray and his family moved to a large house on the Banbury Road in north Oxford. Murray had a second Scriptorium built in its back garden, a larger building than the first, with more storage space for the ever-increasing number of slips being sent to Murray and his team. Anything addressed to "Mr Murray, Oxford" would always find its way to him, and such was the volume of post sent by Murray and his team that the Post Office erected a special post box outside Murray's house. Murray became president of the Oxford Philatelic Society, making use of the substantial collection of postage stamps he received from his many readers around the world.

Murray continued his work on the dictionary, age and failing health doing nothing to diminish his enthusiasm for the work to which he had devoted much of his life. Despite his devotion to the dictionary, which was recognised by his knighthood in 1908, Murray remained a relative outsider in Oxford, never fully taking part in university academic and Senior Common Room life. He was never made a Fellow of an Oxford college, and received an Oxford honorary doctorate only the year before his death.

William Chester Minor was a major contributor to the OED. He became one of the project's most effective volunteers and came to the attention of Murray, who visited him in January 1891. In 1899, Murray paid compliment to Minor's enormous contributions to the dictionary, stating, "we could easily illustrate the last four centuries from his quotations alone".

== In literature and film ==
The book The Surgeon of Crowthorne (published in America as The Professor and the Madman), by Simon Winchester, was published in 1998 and chronicles both Minor's later life and his contributions to the creation of the Oxford English Dictionary.

The movie rights for the book were bought by Mel Gibson's Icon Productions in 1998. Farhad Safinia directed the film adaptation, called The Professor and the Madman, starring Gibson as Murray and Sean Penn as Minor. The film was released in May 2019.

In 2003, Winchester published a broader history, The Meaning of Everything: The Story of the Oxford English Dictionary, which includes the origins of the Oxford English Dictionary and its completion nearly seventy years later.

The Dictionary of Lost Words (2020) is a best-selling novel by Australian author Pip Williams, much of which is set in the scriptorium where Murray and his team worked on the OED.

== Honorary degrees ==
He was awarded honorary doctoral degrees by nine universities, including:

- LL.D from the University of Glasgow in June 1901.
- D.Litt. from the University of Oxford in 1914.
