= Oxford dictionary =

Oxford dictionary may refer to any dictionary published by Oxford University Press, particularly:

== Historical dictionaries ==
- Oxford English Dictionary (OED)
- Shorter Oxford English Dictionary, an abridgement of the OED

== Single-volume dictionaries ==
- Oxford Dictionary of English (ODE)
- New Oxford American Dictionary (NOAD)
- Concise Oxford English Dictionary (COD)
- Compact Oxford English Dictionary of Current English
- Oxford Advanced Learner's Dictionary (OALD)
- Oxford Russian Dictionary (ORD)

== Other works ==
- Lexico, a defunct website which provided a collection of English and Spanish dictionaries produced by Oxford University Press
- Oxford Dictionary of National Biography (DNB)

== See also ==
- Oxford University Press § Series and titles
- Dictionary
- Category:Oxford dictionaries
