= Oxford American Dictionary =

Single-volume dictionary of American English

- Author: Eugene Ehrlich (editor); Stuart Berg Flexner (editor); Gorton Carruth (editor); Joyce M. Hawkins (editor)
- Subject: Dictionary of American English
- Publisher: Oxford University Press
- Publication date: first edition, 1980
- Media type: Print (Hardcover)
- Pages: 816
- ISBN: 0-19-502795-7

The Oxford American Dictionary (OAD) is a single-volume dictionary of American English. It was the first dictionary published by the Oxford University Press to be prepared by American lexicographers and editors.

The work was based on the Oxford Paperback Dictionary, published in 1979. It is no longer in print and has been superseded by the New Oxford American Dictionary. It was criticized by Antonin Scalia and Bryan A. Garner in their well-regarded treatise, Reading Law: The Interpretation of Legal Texts (2012), as "abridged, outdated [and] nonscholarly," a book known "in lexicographic circles ... to have been hastily put together by two editors on short notice, and very much on the cheap. ... Later editions of that dictionary, by contrast, are better works of scholarship"--referring to the New Oxford American Dictionary.

== See also ==
Other Oxford Dictionaries:

- New Oxford American Dictionary (NOAD)
- Oxford English Dictionary (OED)
- Shorter Oxford English Dictionary (SOED)
- Oxford Dictionary of English (ODE)
- Concise Oxford English Dictionary (COED)
- Australian Oxford Dictionary (AOD)
- Canadian Oxford Dictionary (CanOD)
- Oxford Advanced Learner's Dictionary (OALD)
