= New Oxford American Dictionary =

Collection of American English words and their meanings

- Author: Angus Stevenson (editor); Christine A. Lindberg (editor)
- Subject: Dictionary of American English
- Publisher: Oxford University Press
- Publication date: third edition, August 2010
- Media type: Print (Hardcover)
- Pages: 2096
- ISBN: 978-0-19-539288-3

The New Oxford American Dictionary (NOAD) is a single-volume dictionary of American English compiled by American editors at the Oxford University Press.

NOAD is based upon the New Oxford Dictionary of English (NODE), published in the United Kingdom in 1998, although with substantial editing, additional entries, and the inclusion of illustrations. It is based on a corpus linguistics analysis of Oxford's 200 million word database of contemporary American English.

NOAD includes a diacritical respelling scheme to convey pronunciations, as opposed to the Gimson phonemic IPA system that is used in NODE.

== Editions ==
=== First edition ===
Published in September 2001, the first edition was edited by Elizabeth J. Jewell and Frank Abate.

=== Second edition ===
Published in May 2005, the second edition was edited by Erin McKean. The edition added nearly 3,000 new words, senses, and phrases. It was in a large format, with 2096 pages, and was 8½" by 11" in size. It included a CD-ROM with the full text of the dictionary for Palm OS devices.

Since 2005 Apple Inc.'s Mac OS X operating system has come bundled with a dictionary application and widget which credits as its source "Oxford American Dictionaries", and contains the full text of NOAD2. The Amazon Kindle reading device also uses NOAD as its built-in dictionary, along with a choice for the Oxford Dictionary of English.

Oxford University Press published NOAD2 in electronic form in 2006 at the OxfordAmericanDictionary.com, and in 2010, along with the Oxford Dictionary of English, as part of Oxford Dictionaries Online.

=== Third edition ===
Published in August 2010, the third edition was edited by Angus Stevenson and Christine A. Lindberg. This edition includes over 2,000 new words, senses, and phrases, and over 1,000 illustrations; hundreds of new and revised explanatory notes, new "Word Trends" feature charts usage for rapidly changing words and phrases.

=== Abridged edition ===
Based on the NODE, the Concise Oxford American Dictionary was published in 2006.

== Fictitious entry ==
The dictionary includes an entry for the word "esquivalience", which it defines as meaning "the willful avoidance of one's official responsibilities". This is a fictitious entry, intended to protect the copyright of the publication. The entry was invented by Christine Lindberg, one of the editors of the NOAD.

With the publication of the second edition, a rumor circulated that the dictionary contained a fictitious entry in the letter 'e'. New Yorker contributing editor Henry Alford combed the section, and discussed several unusual entries he found with a group of American lexicographers. Most found "esquivalience" to be the most likely candidate, and when Alford approached NOAD editor in chief Erin McKean she confirmed it was a fake entry, which had been present since the first edition, in order to protect the copyright of the CD-ROM edition. Of the word, she said "its inherent fakeitude is fairly obvious".

The fake entry apparently ensnared Dictionary.com, which included an entry for it (that has since been removed) which it attributed to Webster's New Millennium Dictionary, both of which are owned by the private company Lexico. Possibly due to its licensing of Oxford dictionaries, Google Dictionary included the word, listing three meanings and giving usage examples.

== Other Oxford dictionaries ==
- Oxford American Dictionary (OAD)
- Oxford English Dictionary (OED)
- Shorter Oxford English Dictionary (SOED)
- Oxford Dictionary of English (ODE)
- Concise Oxford English Dictionary (COED)
- Australian Oxford Dictionary (AOD)
- Canadian Oxford Dictionary (CanOD)
- Oxford Advanced Learner's Dictionary (OALD)

== See also ==
- Dord
- Trap street

== Bibliography ==
- New Oxford American Dictionary, First Edition, Elizabeth J. Jewell and Frank R. Abate (editors), 2192 pages, September 2001, Oxford University Press, ISBN 0-19-511227-X.
- New Oxford American Dictionary, Second Edition, Erin McKean (editor), 2096 pages, May 2005, Oxford University Press, ISBN 0-19-517077-6.
- New Oxford American Dictionary, Third Edition, Angus Stevenson and Christine A. Lindberg (editors), 2096 pages, August 2010, Oxford University Press, ISBN 978-0-19-539288-3.
