= Lexico =

Dictionary website

- Website type: Dictionary
- Available in: English; Spanish
- Dissolved: 26 August 2022; 4 years ago
- Owner: Dictionary.com
- Creator: Oxford University Press
- Website: www.lexico.com (redirects to www.dictionary.com) formerly www.oxforddictionaries.com (2010–2019)
- Commercial: Yes
- Registration: None
- Current status: Offline

Lexico was a dictionary website that provided a collection of English and Spanish dictionaries produced by Oxford University Press (OUP), the publishing house of the University of Oxford. While the dictionary content on Lexico came from OUP, this website was operated by Dictionary.com, whose eponymous website hosts dictionaries by other publishers such as Random House. The website was closed and redirected to Dictionary.com on 26 August 2022.

Before the Lexico site was launched, the Oxford Dictionary of English and New Oxford American Dictionary were hosted by OUP's own website Oxford Dictionaries Online (ODO), later known as Oxford Living Dictionaries. The dictionaries' definitions have also appeared in Google definition search and the Dictionary application on macOS, among others, licensed through the Oxford Dictionaries API.

== History ==
In the 2000s, OUP allowed access to content of the Compact Oxford English Dictionary of Current English on a website called AskOxford.com. In 2010, Oxford Dictionaries Online was launched under oxforddictionaries.com, superseding the dictionary content of AskOxford.com. Buyers of the third edition of the Oxford Dictionary of English, also published in 2010, were granted a one-year subscription to the website's subscription content. The website's English dictionaries incorporated content of the Oxford Dictionary of English, New Oxford American Dictionary, Oxford Thesaurus of English, and Oxford American Writer's Thesaurus. It also provided a Spanish monolingual dictionary and bilingual dictionaries between English and several languages. As of June 2014, it was updated every three months.

In 2014, OUP launched Oxford Global Languages, an initiative to build lexical resources (bilingual dictionaries) of the world's languages, starting with Zulu and Northern Sotho online dictionaries released in 2015. In 2016, the free content of Oxford Dictionaries Online was rebranded as Oxford Living Dictionaries, and the subscription content as Oxford Dictionaries Premium.

In June 2019, the free-of-charge dictionaries of English and Spanish were moved to Lexico.com, a collaboration between OUP and Dictionary.com, though with the lexicographic content continuing to be written solely by OUP staff. While the offer of the US English dictionary on Oxford Living Dictionaries was terminated upon the migration to Lexico except for words which the UK dictionary did not have entries for, the US dictionary became fully available again on Lexico in early 2020. "Lexico" was itself part of the former name of the company Dictionary.com, Lexico Publishing Group, LLC.

In March 2020, the remaining Oxford Living Dictionaries websites, which hosted dictionaries made in the Global Languages programme, were closed. A statement from OUP said, "Rather than offering a dictionary website for every digitally under-resourced language, we will facilitate third parties to build products and services that best serve the needs of each individual language community. Our efforts will be focused on creating and providing the data that these third parties need." At the time of the closure, they hosted dictionaries of Zulu, Northern Sotho, Malay, Urdu, Tswana, Indonesian, Romanian, Latvian, Swahili, Hindi, Tamil, Gujarati, Tatar, Xhosa, Southern Quechua, Tajik, Tok Pisin, Turkmen, Telugu, and Greek.

On 26 August 2022, Lexico was closed and redirected to Dictionary.com. No reason was given for the closure. Oxford Dictionaries Premium was still available.

== Comparison with the Oxford English Dictionary ==
The Oxford English Dictionary (OED) is a subscription service, while Lexico used the Oxford Dictionaries API to offer more modern versions of the Oxford Dictionary of English and New Oxford American Dictionary to users for free. The OED described its difference from Oxford Dictionaries, the predecessor to Lexico, as follows:

The dictionary content in Oxford Dictionaries focuses on current English and includes modern meanings and uses of words. Where words have more than one meaning, the most important and common meanings in modern English are given first, and less common and more specialist or technical uses are listed below. The OED, on the other hand, is a historical dictionary and it forms a record of all the core words and meanings in English over more than 1,000 years, from Old English to the present day, and including many obsolete and historical terms. Meanings are ordered chronologically in the OED, according to when they were first recorded in English ...
