= Compact Oxford English Dictionary =

Compact Oxford English Dictionary may refer to:

- Compact Editions of the Oxford English Dictionary, the full text of the OED photographically reduced to fit in one or two volumes
- Compact Oxford English Dictionary of Current English, a single-volume general-purpose dictionary
