= Google Dictionary =

Online dictionary service by Google

- Logo of Google Search

- Screenshot Google Dictionary service on Google Search
- Website type: Online dictionary
- Available in: Multiple languages
- Owner: Google
- Creator: Google
- Website: www.google.com/search?q=Dictionary
- Launched: December 2009; 16 years ago

Google Dictionary is an online dictionary service of Google that is accessible in Google Translate, as a Google Chrome extension, and formerly with the "define" operator and other similar phrases (Note: Such as "meaning of [word]"; "spelling of [word]" etc. or simply "dictionary" for the English dictionary.) in Google Search. The dictionary content is licensed from Oxford University Press's Oxford Languages. It is available in different languages, such as English, Spanish and French. The service on Google Search also contained pronunciation audio, Google Translate, a word origin chart, Ngram Viewer, and word games, among other features for the English-language version. Originally available as a standalone service, it was integrated into Google Search, with the standalone service discontinued in August 2011. As of 2026, the Google Dictionary is no longer available on Google Search as it has been replaced with AI Overviews.

Microsoft's Bing provides a similar dictionary service that also licenses dictionary data from Oxford Languages. Apple also licenses dictionary data from Oxford for its iOS and macOS products.

== History ==
The service originated in Google Translate, and was launched as a standalone service (google.com/dictionary) in December 2009. Google displayed definitions from Collins COBUILD Advanced Learner's English Dictionary for English until August 2010, when it switched to the Oxford American College Dictionary.

After being integrated into Google Search, the dictionary was discontinued as a separate service on August 5, 2011, and was accessible with the "define" operator or by simply searching for a word. The dictionary service is also still available in Google Translate and can be accessed by selecting a single word. Google has also released the service as an extension for Chrome.

As of 2023, Google licenses dictionary data from Oxford Languages for multiple languages, including British/American English, Spanish, and German.

On Arabic Language Day (December 18) in 2015, Google added an Arabic-language dictionary, available globally, to the service that showed definitions, translations, and example usages of the word in a sentence.

In February 2017, online news website Daily Caller accused Google of changing the definition of the word "fascism" in Google Dictionary, which resulted in the definition being removed entirely. It was later found that the definition was exactly from an external source and was not written by Google. Definitions for other contentious terms like "rape" were also removed by 2018.

Google added a Hindi dictionary from Rajpal & Sons licensed via Oxford Dictionaries which also supported transliteration and translation to the service in April 2017.

In July 2017, the dictionary was made directly available by typing "dictionary" in Google Search and additional features such as a search box, autocomplete and search history were also added.

In January 2018, a "Similar-sounding words" feature was added to the English dictionary which highlights words that sound similar such as "aesthetic" and "ascetic", "pray" and "prey", "conscientious" and "conscious" etc. "Google Word Coach" vocabulary game was made available along with dictionary searches and as a separate game on mobile devices in February 2018. In August 2018, Google Search added an English and Hindi dictionary for mobile users in India with an option to switch to the English only dictionary.

A "learn to pronounce" option was added to the English dictionary in December 2018 which shows how a word is pronounced with its non-phonemic pronunciation respelling and audio in different accents (such as British and American) along with an option to slow the audio down, visemes for pronunciations were also added in April 2019.

In November 2025, Google began testing replacing the dictionary feature with AI Overviews on Google Search for certain users. In March 2026, Google started replacing the dictionary with AI Overviews for mobile users while the dictionary remained for desktop users. By June 2026, the dictionary feature was fully removed from Google Search and is no longer available.

== Languages ==
Google displays dictionaries for the following languages licensed from Oxford Dictionaries which provides data from its own and other published dictionaries.

Language	Dictionary	Publisher	Notes	Example search (Note: Google Search settings may need to be changed for some dictionaries to appear. Such as country change to a North American country for the American English dictionary or language change for French and Spanish dictionaries.) (Note: No longer works; replaced with AI overview)	Refs.
Arabic			Available worldwide Search operator: "ما معنى"	ما معنى أيان	
Chinese (Simplified)	现代汉语规范词典 [Xiandai Hanyu Guifan Cidian] (The Standard Dictionary of Contemporary Chinese)	Oxford University Press Foreign Language Teaching and Research Press	Available worldwide	define 船	(Note: Compare with the Chinese language dictionary included in Apple's OS' (which licenses dictionaries from Oxford as well): "现代汉语规范词典 / The Standard Dictionary of Contemporary Chinese. Copyright © 2010, 2013 Oxford University Press and Foreign Language Teaching and Research Publishing, Co., Ltd.")
English (UK)	Oxford Dictionary of English Oxford Thesaurus of English	Oxford University Press	Shown worldwide (except North America)	define apple	(Note: Compare with the British English dictionary included in Apple's OS' (which licenses dictionaries from Oxford as well): "Oxford Dictionary of English. Copyright © 2010, 2016 by Oxford University Press.")
English (US)	New Oxford American Dictionary Oxford Thesaurus of English Oxford American Writer's Thesaurus	Oxford University Press, Inc.	Shown in North America	define apple	(Note: Compare with the American English dictionary included in Apple's OS' (which licenses dictionaries from Oxford as well): "New Oxford American Dictionary. Copyright © 2010, 2016 by Oxford University Press, Inc.")
English-Indic (Hindi/Marathi/Tamil)	Oxford Wordpower Dictionary	Oxford University Press	Shown in India (only on mobile devices)	define apple	(Note: Compare Google definition for "apple" to Oxford Wordpower: "a hard, round fruit with a smooth green, red or yellow skin ")
French	Le Petit Robert Google Translate: Multidictionnaire de la langue française (Note: Compare Google definition for "dictionnaire" to Multi: "Recueil des mots d'une ou de plusieurs langues et des informations s'y rapportant, présentés selon un certain ordre (alphabétique, thématique, systématique, etc.).") (Note: Compare with the French language dictionary included in Apple's OS' (which licenses dictionaries from Oxford as well): "Multidictionnaire de la langue française. Copyright © 2012, 2014 Les Éditions Québec Amérique Inc., under licence to Oxford University Press.")	Dictionnaires Le Robert Google Translate: Les Éditions Québec Amérique Inc.	Available worldwide	define légende	(Note: Compare Google definition for "légende" to Petit Robert: "Récit populaire traditionnel, plus ou moins fabuleux")
German	Duden	Bibliographisches Institut GmbH	Available worldwide	define Kraus	(Note: Compare Google definition for "kraus" to Duden: "(von kürzerem Haar) sehr stark, in widerspenstig-spröder Weise gelockt, geringelt") (Note: Compare with the German language dictionary included in Apple's OS' (which licenses dictionaries from Oxford as well): "Wörterbuchsubstanz aus: Duden - Wissensnetz deutsche Sprache. Copyright © 2011, 2013 Bibliographisches Institut GmbH, under licence to Oxford University Press.")
Hindi	राजपाल हिन्दी शब्दकोश [Rajpal Hindi Shabdkosh] (Rajpal Hindi Dictionary)	Rajpal & Sons	Available worldwide Supports transliteration Search operator: "का अर्थ"	शब्द का अर्थ	(Note: Compare with the Hindi language dictionary included in Apple's OS' (which licenses dictionaries from Oxford as well): "राजपाल हिन्दी शब्दकोश / Rajpal Hindi Dictionary. Copyright © 2011 Rajpal & Sons, under licence to Oxford University Press.")
Italian	Il Devoto–Oli	Mondadori Education S.p.A.	Available worldwide	define attrezzo	(Note: Compare Google definition for "attrezzo" to Devoto–Oli: "Ciascuno degli utensili o strumenti occorrenti a una determinata attività") (Note: Compare with the Italian language dictionary included in Apple's OS' (which licenses dictionaries from Oxford as well): "Un dizionario italiano da un affiliato di Oxford University Press. Copyright © 2005, 2013 Mondadori Education S.p.A., under licence to Oxford University Press. ... DictionaryIdentifier: com.apple.dictionary.it.Devoto-Oli")
Japanese			Available worldwide	define こんにちは	
Korean	뉴에이스 국어사전 [Nyueiseu Gug-eosajeon] New Ace Korean Language Dictionary	DIOTEK	Available worldwide	define 한국어	(Note: Compare with the Korean language dictionary included in Apple's OS' (which licenses dictionaries from Oxford as well): 뉴에이스 국어사전 / New Ace Korean Language Dictionary. Copyright © 2012 DIOTEK, under licence to Oxford University Press.)
Portuguese (Brazil)	Houaiss Dictionary of the Portuguese Language	Editora Objetiva	Available worldwide	define alho	(Note: Compare Google definition for "alho" to Houaiss Dictionary: "erva de até 60 cm (Allium sativum), com folhas lineares, flores brancas ou avermelhadas e cápsulas loculicidas") (Note: Compare with the Portuguese language dictionary included in Apple's OS' (which licenses dictionaries from Oxford as well): Dicionário de Português licenciado para Oxford University Press. Copyright © 2012 Editora Objetiva, under licence to Oxford University Press.)
Russian	Dictionary of the Russian Language (Ozhegov)	"Universe and Education" Publishing House Ltd.	Available worldwide	define ресторан	(Note: Compare Google definition for "ресторан" to Explanatory Dictionary: "Род столовой (во 2 знач.) где подают кушанья, закуски, напитки, ви́на.") (Note: Compare with the Russian language dictionary included in Apple's OS' (which licenses dictionaries from Oxford as well): "С. И. Ожегов «Толковый словарь русского языка» / S.I. Ojegov: Explanatory Dictionary of the Russian Language. Copyright © 2012 "Universe and Education" Publishing House Ltd., under licence to Oxford University Press.")
Spanish	Diccionario General de la Lengua Española Vox	Larousse Editorial SL	Available worldwide	define trastienda	(Note: Compare with the Spanish language dictionary included in Apple's OS' (which licenses dictionaries from Oxford as well): "Diccionario General de la Lengua Española Vox. Copyright © 2012, 2013 Larousse Editorial, S.L., under licence to Oxford University Press.")
Thai	พจนานุกรมไทย ฉบับทันสมัยและสมบูรณ์ [Phcnanukrm Thiy Chbab Thansmay Laea Smburn] (Complete Thai Dictionary)	SE-Education Public Company Limited	Available worldwide	define ด	(Note: Compare with the Thai language dictionary included in Apple's OS' (which licenses dictionaries from Oxford as well): พจนานุกรมไทย ฉบับทันสมัยและสมบูรณ์ / Complete Thai Dictionary. Copyright © 2009 Se-Education PLC, under licence to Oxford University Press.)
Turkish	Arkadaş Türkçe Sözlük	Arkadaş Publishing Ltd	Available worldwide	define iltifat	(Note: Compare with the Turkish language dictionary included in Apple's OS' (which licenses dictionaries from Oxford as well): "Arkadaş Türkçe Sözlük. Copyright © 2012 Arkadaş Publishing LTD, under licence to Oxford University Press.")

See details for Oxford Dictionaries datasets licensing for other languages here.

== See also ==
- Google
- List of Google products
