= Iona and Peter Opie =

British husband-and-wife folklorists

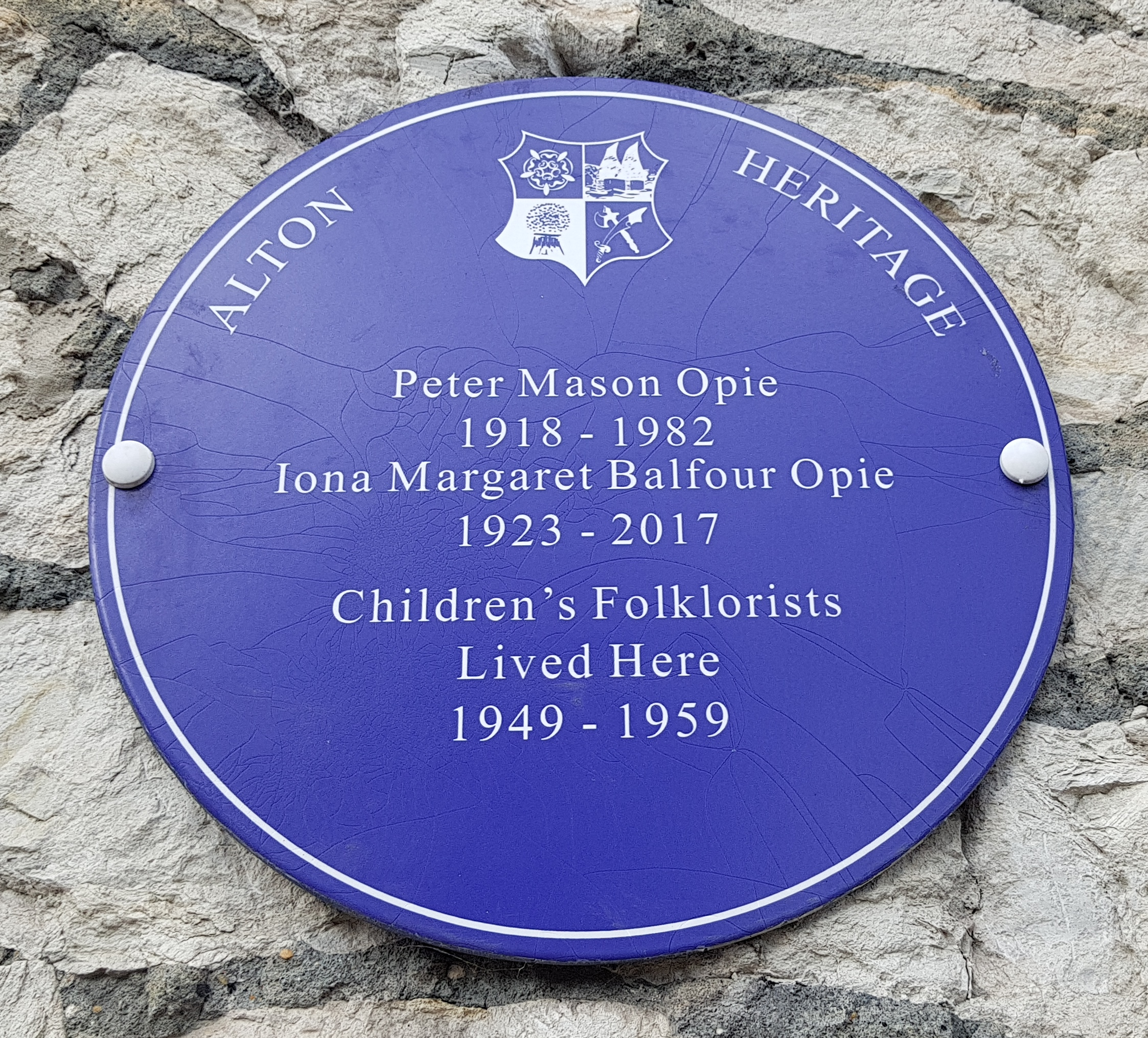
A blue plaque to the Opies

Iona Margaret Balfour Opie, CBE, FBA (13 October 1923 – 23 October 2017) and Peter Mason Opie (25 November 1918 – 5 February 1982) were an English married team of folklorists who applied modern techniques to understanding children's literature and play, in studies such as The Oxford Dictionary of Nursery Rhymes (1951) and The Lore and Language of Schoolchildren (1959). They were also noted anthologists, assembled large collections of children's literature, toys, and games and were regarded as world-famous authorities on children's lore and customs.

Their research had a considerable impact on a number of research fields, including folklore and childhood studies, and altered perceptions of children's street culture and notions of play by emphasising the agency of children.

Working outside of academia, the couple worked together closely, from their home (firstly near Farnham, Surrey, later in Alton, Hampshire) conducting primary fieldwork, library research, and interviews with thousands of children. In pursuing the folklore of contemporary childhood they directly recorded rhymes and games in real time as they were being sung, chanted, or played. They collaborated on several celebrated books and produced over 30 works.

== Early lives ==
Peter Opie was born in 1918 in Cairo in the war-time British Protectorate or Sultanate of Egypt and was educated at Eton College. At the outbreak of World War II, Opie joined the Royal Fusiliers, becoming a sub-lieutenant in the Royal Sussex Regiment. However, an accident whilst training ended his military career. He began a career as a writer and was joint winner of the £1,000 Chosen Books competition, with his autobiographical discursion The Case of Being a Young Man (published in paperback, 1946).

Iona Margaret Balfour Archibald was born in Colchester, Essex, England in 1923. She was educated at Sandecotes School, a boarding school for girls in Parkstone, Dorset. During World War II she joined the meteorological section of the Women's Auxiliary Air Force.

The couple met during World War II and married on 2 September 1943. The couple moved from London to rural England. Their interest in children's lore has been credited to the Opies recalling whilst out on a countryside walk, the "Ladybird, ladybird, fly away home" rhyme from their youth. They began researching into the origins of the rhyme, and as their interest grew they began to collect nursery rhyme books.

== Development of their research ==
The Lore and Language of Schoolchildren

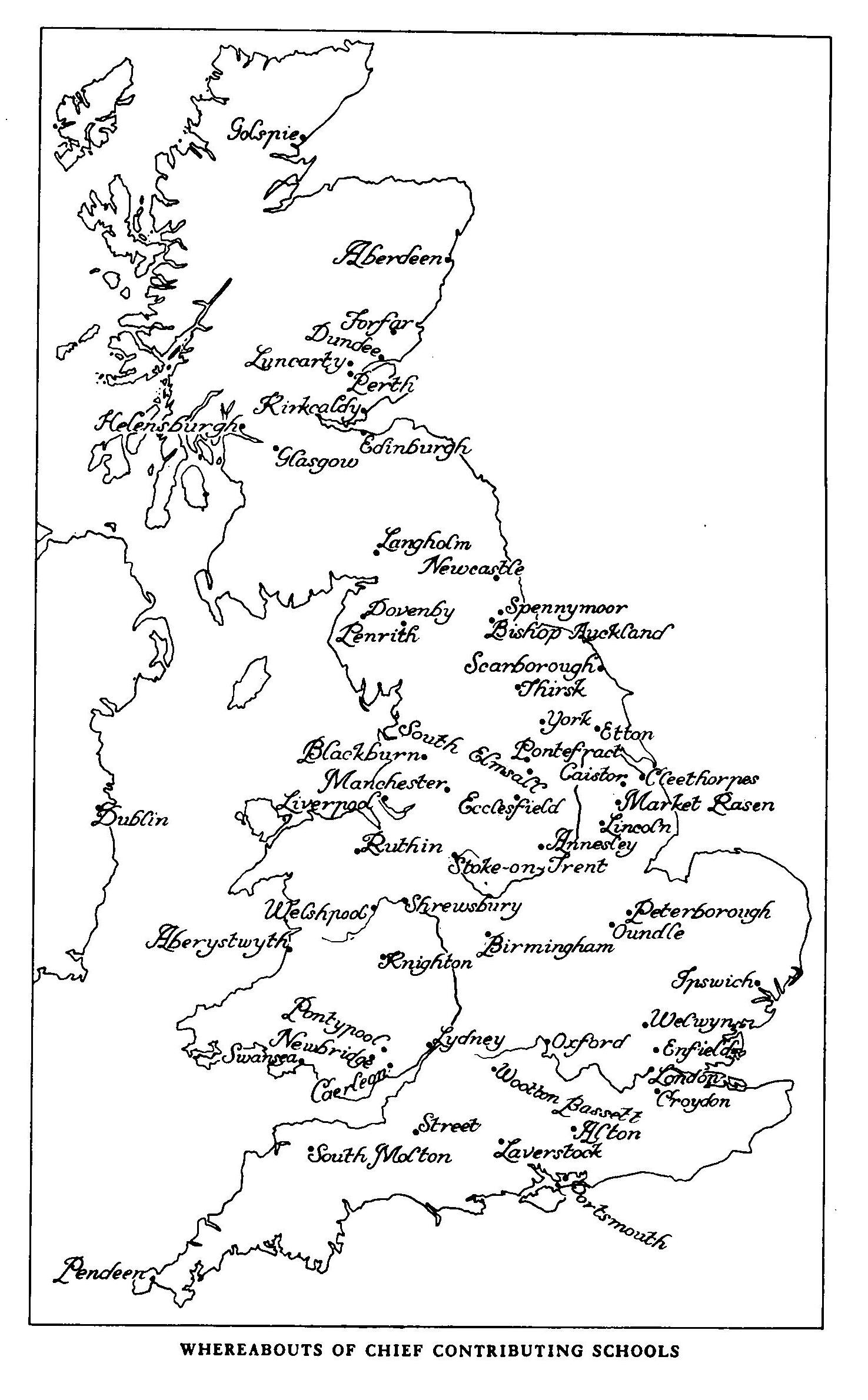
Map of contributing schools from The Lore and Language of Schoolchildren, 1959

Initially, the Opies based their research on printed material or previously collected oral sources. In 1951, they published The Oxford Book of Nursery Rhymes, still hailed as the standard work on the subject.

From the early 1950s, they increasingly drew on their own field research, carrying out interviews with school-age children via a network of school teachers. By the time of the publication of The Lore and Language of Schoolchildren (1959), they had received contributions from about five thousand children (at seventy state schools). Over the following decades, the number of contributors grew: Iona Opie believing the final total to be close to twenty thousand.

The Lore and Language of Schoolchildren was meant to counter the argument that mass media and the entertainment industry had ruined childhood traditions. The Opies' use of surveys as a research methodology has been compared to growth of social surveys (such as the Mass-Observation project) in Britain from the 1930s onwards. The book has also been seen as revitalising the study of Folklore in post-war Britain, the subject having fallen into relative decline.

Speaking in 2010, Iona spoke of working with her husband as being "like two of us in a very small boat and each had an oar and we were trying to row across the Atlantic" and that "[W]e would never discuss ideas verbally except very late at night".

== Later years ==
Peter Opie died on 5 February 1982 at home, Westerfield House, West Liss, Hampshire.

Iona Opie continued to research and publish. She completed two further volumes based on the Opies' joint research, The Singing Game (1985) and Children's Games with Things (1997). She also collaborated with Moira Tatem on A Dictionary of Superstitions (1989), and with Brian Alderson and her son, Robert Opie, on A Treasury of Childhood: Books, Toys, and Games from the Opie Collection (1989). Iona Opie revised the Oxford Dictionary of Nursery Rhymes (1997) and went onto produce a solo volume, The People in the Playground (1993), which differed by "focusing on the players, rather than the games and rhymes".

Iona Opie died on 23 October 2017.

== Recognition ==
In 1960, the Opies were jointly awarded the Coote Lake Medal, the highest honour of The Folklore Society, "for outstanding research and scholarship". Peter Opie also served as President of the Folklore Society in 1963 and 1964 and President of the Anthropology Section of the British Association in 1962 and 1963. In 1985, The Singing Game was awarded the Folklore Society's Katharine Briggs Award.

In 1962, the Opies were awarded honorary degrees from Oxford University. Further honorary degrees from the Universities of Southampton, Nottingham and Surrey, and the Open University followed.

In 1970, the Opies were awarded the Chicago Prize of the American Folklore Society for their book, Children's Games in Street and Playground. The American Folklore Society's biannual prize for the best book published on children's folklore is named in honour of the Opies.

Iona Opie was elected a Fellow of the British Academy (FBA) in 1998 and was made a Commander of the Order of the British Empire (CBE) in 1999.

== Opie collections ==
The Opies' collection of children's books and ephemera covers the 16th to the 20th centuries and is the richest library of children's literature. It was begun in 1944, amounting in the end to 20,000 pieces. During 1988, it was donated to the Bodleian Library at Oxford University, after a two-year public appeal raised the £500,000 cost. The collection is also available on microfiche.

The Archive of Iona and Peter Opie (the Opie 'Working Papers') is also held at the Bodleian Library. It contains the bulk of the Opie papers and includes "responses of an estimated 10,000 children from schools all over Britain to a series of surveys undertaken by the Opies in the period c.1950–1980". The collection also sheds light on the Opie's working methods, for instance, the nature of the questionnaires that the Opies sent to children (and once completed were sent back to them). The cataloguing of this archive was completed in 2018.

The Opie Collection of Children's Games and Songs is an archive of audiotapes donated to the British Library in 1998. It contains fieldwork recordings of children's play made by Iona Opie between 1969 and 1983, as research for The Singing Game about singing games.

The Opie Papers held by the Folklore Society, London, contain adult and child contributions relating to children's customs and belief, as well as Opie research materials, personal papers and Folklore Society papers. They can be consulted by prior appointment.

The Archive of Iona and Peter Opie, the Opie Collection of Children's Games and Songs and the Opie Papers held by the Folklore Society, are being catalogued, digitised and made freely available online as part of a collaboration between University of Sheffield, University College London, the Bodleian Libraries, the Folklore Society and the British Library. The collaboration is called Childhoods and Play: The Iona and Peter Opie Archive and is a British Academy Research Project.

== Selected works ==
They authored about 25 books including:

- Peter Opie, 1946, The Case of Being a Young Man, a discursion (Chosen Books, competition prize winner)
- Iona and Peter Opie, collectors and editors, 1947. I Saw Esau: Traditional Rhymes of Youth (Williams & Norgate Ltd)
- Iona and Peter Opie, editors, 1951. The Oxford Dictionary of Nursery Rhymes (Oxford University Press)
- Iona and Peter Opie, 1959, The Lore and Language of Schoolchildren (Oxford University Press)
- Iona and Peter Opie, 1963, The Puffin Book of Nursery Rhymes (Penguin/Puffin)
- Iona and Peter Opie, 1969, Children's Games in Street and Playground (Oxford University Press)
- Iona and Peter Opie, editors, 1974. The Classic Fairy Tales (Oxford University Press). Presents the texts of twenty-four familiar fairy tales as they were first published in English; summarises the history of each tale, especially from the textual point of view.
- Iona and Peter Opie, 1985. The Singing Game (Oxford University Press).
- Iona and Peter Opie, 1988. Tail Feathers of Mother Goose (Little Brown & Company).
- Iona Opie, 1993. The People in the Playground. (Oxford University Press).
- Iona and Peter Opie, 1997. Children's Games with Things (Oxford University Press).
- Opie, Iona, and Moira Tatem, eds. 1989, A Dictionary of Superstitions. Oxford: Oxford University Press,

== See also ==
- Children's street culture
- Roud Folk Song Index
