= Dictionary (software) =

Dictionary application for macOS developed by Apple

- Dictionary running on macOS Tahoe 26
- Developer: Apple
- Stable release: 2.3.0 / August 18, 2018; 7 years ago
- Operating system: macOS
- Type: Dictionary
- License: Proprietary
- Website: support.apple.com/ja-jp/guide/dictionary/welcome/mac

Dictionary is an application developed by Apple as a part of macOS. The application provides definitions and synonyms from various dictionaries, Wikipedia articles and a glossary of Apple-related terms.

Dictionary was introduced in OS X 10.4 with the New Oxford American Dictionary and Oxford American Writer's Thesaurus (as well as the Wikipedia and Apple Dictionary sections). 10.5 added Japanese dictionaries, 10.7 added the British Oxford Dictionary of English, and 10.8 added French, German, Spanish and Chinese.

== History ==
OS X's progenitor, OPENSTEP (and NEXTSTEP) provided similar functionality, called Digital Webster, providing dictionary and thesaurus definitions from Webster's Ninth New Collegiate Dictionary and Webster's Collegiate Thesaurus (termed the "First Digital Edition"). OPENSTEP Services provide lookup from all applications.

Dictionary was first introduced with Mac OS X v10.4 "Tiger" and provided definitions from the New Oxford American Dictionary, 2nd Edition. With Mac OS X 10.7 "Lion", Dictionary was updated to the Third Edition of the New Oxford American Dictionary and the British Oxford Dictionary of English was added.

== Functionality ==
Words can be entered in the search bar by just typing the first few letters. The application will perform an incremental search to show any matching headwords or forms and will try to bypass spelling errors. Clicking on any word in a definition searches for that word in the dictionary again. Almost any word is clickable, except the pronunciations in phonetic characters and numerals.

The Preferences allow a user to select from three different pronunciation schemes, either US English (Diacritical or IPA), or British English (IPA).

The dictionary and thesaurus in Dictionary are in an XML format, but make use of precompiled binary index files to access the XML file directly. Therefore, the lexicon cannot easily be modified. However, the user can add new words to the macOS system-wide spell checker, which uses its own lexicon.

=== Quick access ===
- In applications which support "Services", there is an option in the application menu (for example, Safari>Services>Look up in Dictionary) which brings up the Dictionary application and displays the definition of a selected word. The same option appears in the contextual menu after a Control-click on the selected word.
- The key combination control+⌘ Command+D can be used in Cocoa applications which display text – it brings up a small contextual menu-like definition or synonym of the word under the cursor.
- As of Mac OS X Lion, a three finger tap on the trackpad (either the built-in MacBook trackpad or the Magic Trackpad) has the same effect as the control+⌘ Command+D shortcut.
- In applications which support the ability of the user to drag selected text, it is possible to select a word and drop it onto the icon of the Dictionary application in the Dock.
- Dashboard includes a widget for accessing the Dictionary application.
- macOS catches any queries to the dict:// URI scheme, say from a web browser, and routes them back to the Dictionary application.
- Since OS X Leopard, the dictionary has become tightly integrated with Spotlight, allowing users to view definitions from immediately within the system search.

=== Other languages ===
Mac OS X 10.5 (Leopard) added the Japanese-language dictionary Daijisen, Progressive English to Japanese and Progressive Japanese to English dictionaries, and the 25,000-entry thesaurus "Tsukaikata no Wakaru Ruigo Reikai Jiten" (使い方の分かる類語例解辞典), all of which are provided by the Japanese publisher Shogakukan. The Japanese dictionaries do not show up by default, and must be enabled in Preferences.

In OS X 10.8 Mountain Lion, the Japanese dictionaries were replaced by Super Daijirin and the Wisdom English-Japanese Dictionary. In addition, dictionaries were also added for French (Multidictionnaire de la Langue Française for Macs sold in Europe, or Les Éditions Québec Amérique for Macs sold in America), German (Duden), Spanish (Vox), and Chinese (Standard Dictionary of Contemporary Chinese).

Software such as DictUnifier can be used to add more dictionaries to the application.

== List of all pre-installed dictionaries ==
| Type | Language(s) | | Original name | English name | Publisher |
| Type | Language A | Language B | Original name | English name | Publisher |
|---|---|---|---|---|---|
| Monolingual | English (US) | | New Oxford American Dictionary | | Oxford University Press |
| Monolingual | English (UK) | | Oxford Dictionary of English | | Oxford University Press |
| Monolingual | Norwegian Bokmål | | Norsk Ordbok | Norwegian Monolingual Dictionary | Kunnskapsforlaget ANS (licensed to Oxford University Press) |
| Monolingual | Danish | | Politikens Nudansk Ordbog | Politikens Modern Danish Dictionary | Politikens Forlagshus (licensed to Oxford University Press) |
| Monolingual | Swedish | | NE Ordbok | NE Dictionary | Nationalencyklopedin (licensed to Oxford University Press) |
| Monolingual | Dutch | | Prisma woordenboek Nederlands | | Uitgeverij Unieboek (licensed to Oxford University Press) |
| Monolingual | German | | Duden-Wissensnetz deutsche Sprache | | Bibliographisches Institut GmbH (licensed to Oxford University Press) |
| Monolingual | French | | Multidictionnaire de la language français | | Les Éditions Québec Amérique Inc. (licensed to Oxford University Press) |
| Monolingual | Portuguese | | Dicionário de Português | | Editora Objetiva (licensed to Oxford University Press) |
| Monolingual | Spanish | | Diccionario General de la Lengua Española Vox | | Larousse Editorial, S.L. (licensed to Oxford University Press) |
| Monolingual | Italian | | Il Devoto-Oli. Vocabolario della lingua italiana | | Mondadori Education S.p.A. (licensed to Oxford University Press) |
| Monolingual | Russian | | Толковый словарь русского языка | Explanatory Dictionary of the Russian Language | "Universe and Education" Publishing House Ltd. (licensed to Oxford University Press) |
| Monolingual | Turkish | | Arkadaş Türkçe Sözlük | | Arkadaş Publishing LTD (licensed to Oxford University Press) |
| Monolingual | Hebrew | | מילון אבן-שושן מחודש ומותאם לשנות האלפיים | Even-Shoshan Dictionary Renewed and Updated for the 21st Century | The New Dictionary Ltd (licensed to Oxford University Press) |
| Monolingual | Hindi | | राजपाल हिन्दी शब्दकोश | Rajpal Hindi Dictionary | Rajpal & Sons (licensed to Oxford University Press) |
| Monolingual | Thai | | พจนานุกรมไทย ฉบับทันสมัยและสมบูรณ์ | Complete Thai Dictionary | Se-Education PLC (licensed to Oxford University Press) |
| Monolingual | Korean | | 뉴에이스 국어사전 | New Ace Korean Language Dictionary | DIOTEK (licensed to Oxford University Press) |
| Monolingual | Japanese | | スーパー大辞林 | Super Daijirin Japanese Dictionary | Sanseido Co., Ltd. (licensed to Oxford University Press) |
| Monolingual | Chinese (simplified) | | 现代汉语规范词典 | The Standard Dictionary of Contemporary Chinese | Oxford University Press & Foreign Language Teaching and Research Publishing, Co., Ltd. |
| Monolingual | Chinese (traditional) | | 五南國語活用辭典 | Wu-Nan Chinese Dictionary | Wu-Nan Book Inc. (licensed to Oxford University Press) |
| Monolingual | Chinese (traditional, Hong Kong) | | 商務新詞典（全新版） | Commercial New Dictionary for common word or character | Commercial Press (licensed to Oxford University Press) |
| Thesaurus | English (US) | | Oxford American Writer's Thesaurus | | Oxford University Press |
| Thesaurus | English (UK) | | Oxford Thesaurus of English | | Oxford University Press |
| Thesaurus | Chinese (simplified) | | 现代汉语同义词典 | Modern Thesaurus/Synonyms & Antonyms | Shanghai Lexicographical Publishing House (licensed to Oxford University Press) |
| Bilingual | Chinese | Japanese | 超級クラウン中日辞典 | Sanseido's Super Crown Chinese-Japanese Dictionary | Sanseido Company Ltd. (licensed to Oxford University Press) |
| Bilingual | Japanese | Chinese | クラウン日中辞典 | Sanseido's Crown Japanese-Chinese Dictionary | Sanseido Company Ltd. (licensed to Oxford University Press) |
| Bilingual | Dutch | English | Prisma Handwoordenboek Engels | | Uitgeverij Unieboek (licensed to Oxford University Press) |
| Bilingual | German | English | Oxford German Dictionary | | Oxford University Press |
| Bilingual | French | English | Oxford-Hachette French Dictionary | | Oxford University Press & Hachette Livre |
| Bilingual | Portuguese | English | Oxford Portuguese Dictionary | | Oxford University Press |
| Bilingual | Spanish | English | Gran Diccionario Oxford - Español-Inglés | Oxford Spanish Dictionary | Oxford University Press |
| Bilingual | English | Spanish | Gran Diccionario Oxford - Inglés-Español | Oxford Spanish Dictionary | Oxford University Press |
| Bilingual | English | Italian | Oxford Paravia Il Dizionario inglese - italiano | Oxford - Paravia Italian Dictionary | Pearson Italia & Oxford University Press |
| Bilingual | Italian | English | Oxford Paravia Il Dizionario italiano - inglese | Oxford - Paravia Italian Dictionary | Pearson Italia & Oxford University Press |
| Bilingual | Polish | English | Wielki słownik polsko-angielski | Oxford PWN Polish-English Dictionary | Wydawnictwo Naukowe PWN S.A. & Oxford University Press |
| Bilingual | Russian | English | Oxford Russian Dictionary | | Oxford University Press |
| Bilingual | Arabic | English | Oxford Arabic Dictionary | | Oxford University Press |
| Bilingual | Hindi | English | The Oxford Hindi English Dictionary | | Oxford University Press |
| Bilingual | English | Hindi | Oxford English-English-Hindi Dictionary | | Oxford University Press |
| Bilingual | English | Thai | พจนานุกรมอังกฤษ-ไทย & ไทย-อังกฤษ ฉบับทันสมัยและสมบูรณ์ที่สุด | New SE-ED English-Thai & Thai-English Dictionary | Dr. Wit Theingburanathum (licensed to Oxford University Press) |
| Bilingual | Thai | English | พจนานุกรมอังกฤษ-ไทย & ไทย-อังกฤษ ฉบับทันสมัยและสมบูรณ์ที่สุด | New SE-ED English-Thai & Thai-English Dictionary | Dr. Wit Theingburanathum (licensed to Oxford University Press) |
| Bilingual | Vietnamese | English | Lac Viet Dictionary | | Lac Viet Computing Corp. (licensed to Oxford University Press) |
| Bilingual | English | Korean | 뉴에이스 영한사전 | New Ace English-Korean Dictionary | DIOTEK Co., Ltd. (licensed to Oxford University Press) |
| Bilingual | Korean | English | 뉴에이스 한영사전 | New Ace Korean-English Dictionary | DIOTEK Co., Ltd. (licensed to Oxford University Press) |
| Bilingual | English | Japanese | ウィズダム英和辞典 | The Wisdom English-Japanese Dictionary | Sanseido Company Ltd. (licensed to Oxford University Press) |
| Bilingual | Japanese | English | ウィズダム和英辞典 | The Wisdom Japanese-English Dictionary | Sanseido Company Ltd. (licensed to Oxford University Press) |
| Bilingual | Indonesian | English | Oxford Study Indonesian Dictionary | | Oxford University Press |
| Bilingual | Cantonese | English | 英譯廣東口語詞典 | A Dictionary of Cantonese Colloquialisms in English | Commercial Press (licensed to University Press) |
| Bilingual | English | Gujarati | Gujarati Lexicon English-Gujarati | | Gujarati Lexicon & Oxford University Press |
| Bilingual | Gujarati | English | Gujarati-English Dictionaries | | Gujarati Lexicon & Oxford University Press |
| Bilingual | Tamil | English | Oxford Tamil-Tamil-English Dictionaries | | Oxford University Press |
| Bilingual | English | Tamil | Oxford English-English-Tamil Dictionaries | | Oxford University Press |
| Bilingual | English | Telugu | Oxford English-English-Telugu Dictionary | | Oxford University Press |
| Bilingual | Telugu | English | Oxford Telugu-English Dictionary | | Oxford University Press |
| Bilingual | English | Urdu | Oxford English-Urdu Dictionary | | Oxford University Press |
| Bilingual | Urdu | English | Oxford Urdu-English Dictionary | | Oxford University Press |
| Bilingual | French | German | PONS Großwörterbuch Französisch – Deutsch | | PONS GmbH (licensed to Oxford University Press) |
| Bilingual | German | French | PONS Großwörterbuch Deutsch – Französisch | | PONS GmbH (licensed to Oxford University Press) |
| Bilingual | English | Chinese (simplified) | 牛津英汉汉英词典 | Oxford Chinese Dictionary | Oxford University Press & Foreign Language Teaching and Research Publishing Co., Ltd. |
| Bilingual | Chinese (simplified) | English | 牛津英汉汉英词典 | Oxford Chinese Dictionary | Oxford University Press & Foreign Language Teaching and Research Publishing Co., Ltd. |
| Bilingual | English | Chinese (traditional) | 譯典通英漢雙向字典 | Dr. Eye Chinese English Bilingual Dictionary | INVENTEC (licensed to Oxford University Press) |
| Bilingual | Chinese (traditional) | English | 譯典通英漢雙向字典 | Dr. Eye Chinese English Bilingual Dictionary | INVENTEC (licensed to Oxford University Press) |
| Monolingual, Chinese Idioms | Chinese (simplified) | | 商务成语大词典 | Commercial Idiom Dictionary | Commercial Press (licensed to Oxford University Press) |
| Bilingual, Chinese Idioms | Chinese (traditional) | English | 漢英對照成語詞典 | Chinese Idioms and Their English Equivalents | Commercial Press (licensed to Oxford University Press) |
| Other | English | | Apple Dictionary | | Apple Inc. |
| Other | Multiple languages | | Wikipedia | | Wikimedia Foundation, Inc. |
