= Oxford Dictionary of English =

Single-volume dictionary, first published in 1998

- A copy of the First Edition of NODE
- Language: English
- Release number: 3
- Genre: Dictionary
- Published: 1 August 2010
- Publisher: Oxford University Press
- Publication place: United Kingdom
- Pages: 2112
- ISBN: 978-0199571123
- Preceded by: Second Edition

The Oxford Dictionary of English (ODE) is a single-volume English dictionary published by Oxford University Press, first published in 1998 as The New Oxford Dictionary of English (NODE). The word "New" was dropped from the title with the Second Edition in 2003. The dictionary is not based on the Oxford English Dictionary (OED) – it is a separate dictionary which strives to represent faithfully the current usage of English words. The Revised Second Edition contains 355,000 words, phrases, and definitions, including biographical references and thousands of encyclopaedic entries. The Third Edition was published in August 2010, with some new words, including vuvuzela.

It is currently the largest single-volume English-language dictionary published by Oxford University Press, but is much smaller than the comprehensive Oxford English Dictionary, which is published in multiple volumes.

== Editorial principles and practices ==
The first editor, Judy Pearsall, wrote in the introduction that it is based on a modern understanding of language and is derived from a corpus of contemporary English usage. For example, the editors did not discourage split infinitives, but instead justified their use in some contexts. The first edition was based on bodies of texts such as the British National Corpus and the citation database of the Oxford Reading Programme.

The dictionary "views the language from the perspective that English is a world language", and includes coverage of English usage from the United States to the Caribbean and New Zealand.

Pronunciations of common, everyday words were omitted. The International Phonetic Alphabet (IPA) is used to present pronunciations, which are based on Received Pronunciation.

The Second Edition added over 3,000 new words, senses and phrases drawn from the Oxford English Corpus.

The New Oxford American Dictionary is the American version of the Oxford Dictionary of English, with substantial editing and uses a diacritical respelling scheme rather than the IPA system.

The third editions of both texts were published in 2010, and form the basis of the ongoing electronic versions of the dictionaries. Both are edited by Angus Stevenson, who contributed to the first edition of the Oxford Dictionary of English.

== Publications ==
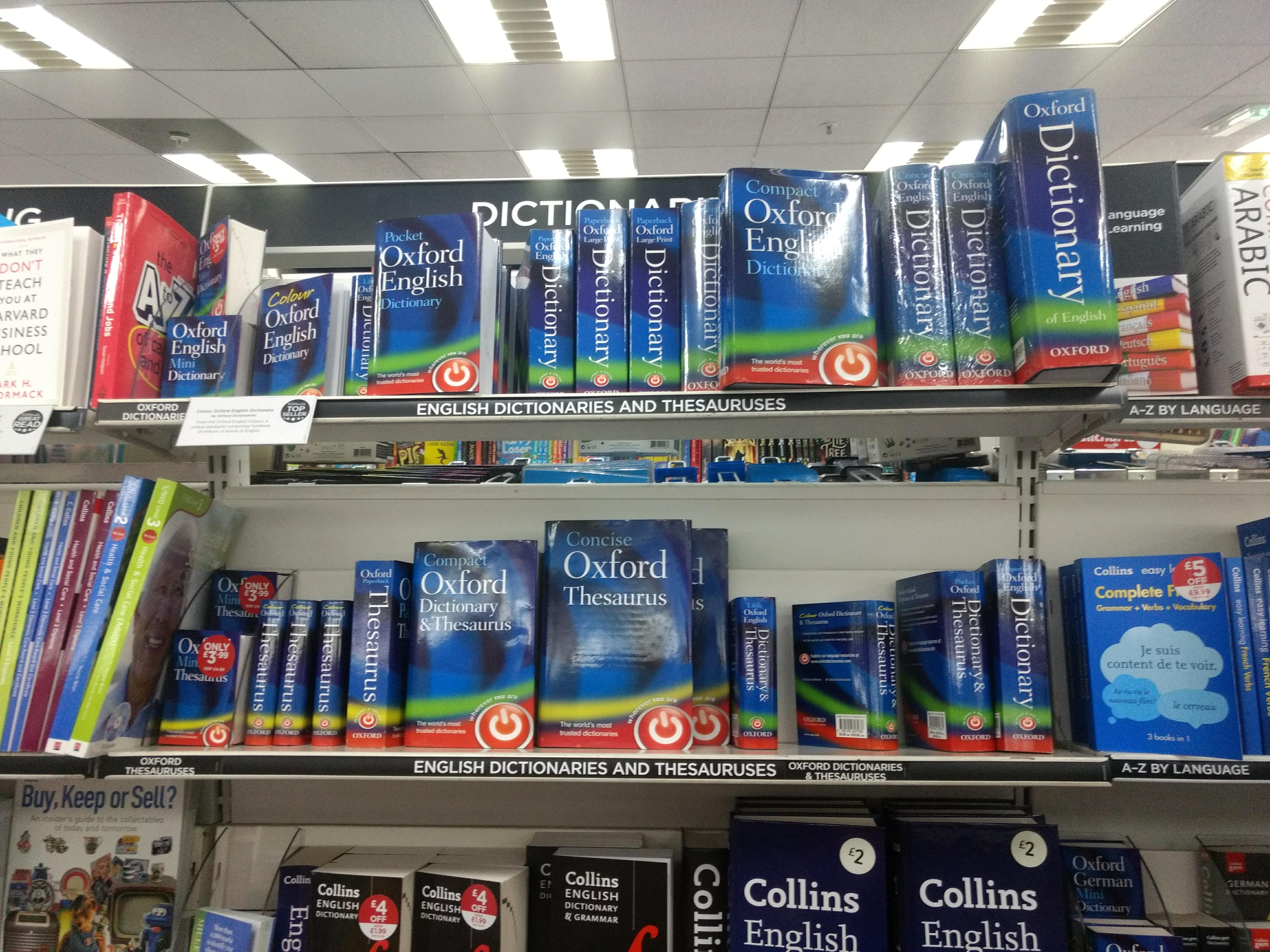
A selection of various Oxford English Dictionaries: mini, little, pocket, compact, concise, etc. (2018).

- The New Oxford Dictionary of English
  - First edition: 350,000 entries (including 12,000 encyclopaedic entries and 52,000 scientific and technical
- Oxford Dictionary of English
  - Second Edition – 2003
  - Second Edition, Revised – 2005
  - Third edition – 2010

As of 2014, the online version was updated every three months. The online version added more than 80,000 words from the OED by August 2015, and included nearly 100,000 headwords, with 11,000 proper names, over 350,000 words and phrases and definitions, 11,000 encyclopaedic entries, 68,000 explanations.

== See also ==
- Concise Oxford English Dictionary (COED)
- Compact Oxford English Dictionary of Current English
- New Oxford American Dictionary (NOAD)
- Oxford Advanced Learner's Dictionary (OALD)
- Oxford English Dictionary (OED)
- Shorter Oxford English Dictionary (SOED)
- Australian Oxford Dictionary (AOD)
- Canadian Oxford Dictionary (CanOD)
