= Reed Tech =

Reed Technology and Information Services Inc
- Type: Subsidiary
- Industry: Information Services
- Founded: 1961
- Headquarters: Horsham, PA, United States
- Products: Complex data capture XML format, conversion and management; web and social media capture and archiving services; Patent Advisor Suite and IP Services

Reed Technology and Information Services Inc. is a company that provides electronic content management services, engaging in data capture and conversion, preservation, analysis, e-submission and publication for corporate, legal and government clients. The company was founded in 1961 and is based in Horsham, Pennsylvania, with an additional office in Alexandria, Virginia.

== History ==
The company was incorporated in 1966 as International Computaprint Corporation (ICC). In 1969, the U.S. Patent and Trademark Office (USPTO) contracted ICC to develop and operate a computer system for use in the patent publishing process. As part of the company's core business in managing and converting data, the company launched the ReedFax service in 1992, making copies of U.S. and foreign patent and trademark documents available to law firms, corporate legal departments and patent practitioners.

In 1995, the company changed its name to Reed Technology and Information Services Inc.

When the U.S. Food and Drug Administration (FDA) mandated that all prescription drug labeling information must be submitted in Structured Product Labeling Extensible Markup Language (SPL XML) format in 2005, Reed Tech created an SPL XML submission solution for the pharmaceutical sciences and other life sciences industries, for which the company won a 2010 CIO100 Award. The company also achieved Federal Information Security Management Act (FISMA) certification for its data center operations in 2006.

In 2012, Reed Technology achieved SOC2 SSAE-16 accreditation from the AICPA.

== Products and services ==
As a LexisNexis company, Reed Tech specializes in the field of content management and intellectual property services in the areas of life sciences, patent prosecution, research and analysis.

=== Intellectual property ===
The Reed Tech Intellectual Property products span a range of capabilities, including data capture and conversion, preservation, analysis, e-submission and publication for corporate, legal and government clients. In 2013, Reed Tech, in collaboration with PatentCore, announced the launch of the PatentAdvisor service, designed to deliver searchable and actionable data for patent attorneys and IP-driven companies focused on the prosecution and management of patents by providing searchable, filterable access to historical behavior data for nearly every U.S. patent examiner and art unit. In addition, document retrieval, translations, and research and analysis of U.S. and international patent documents are offered through the company's IP Services (formerly ReedFax).

=== Life sciences ===
The company's Life Sciences products focus on electronic data conversion and submissions to regulatory agencies, including the U.S. Food and Drug Administration (FDA) as a solution for the FDA’s Structured Product Labeling (SPL) format and the XEVMPD format for the European Medicines Agency (EMA). Since the inception of SPL in 2005, Reed Tech has worked closely with the pharmaceutical industry and the FDA, and is a member of the Health Level 7 (HL7) working group. Utilizing the SPL XML format, Reed Tech also offers label printing and publishing solutions, allowing pharmaceutical companies to reuse FDA-approved drug labels for printed marketing and manufacturing materials.

Reed Tech helps companies find detailed human and animal health drug product label information online with its PDR3D digital drug database and LabelDataPlus.com.

In September 2013, the FDA issued a final rule requiring medical device manufacturers to provide a Unique Device Identification (UDI) to a centralized Global UDI (GUDID) database, much like the FDA's SPL database. Reed Tech has developed a UDI / GUDID solution to meet the growing demand from device firms for help in complying with the time- and resource-intensive submission process.
