= Concise Oxford English Dictionary =

English dictionary

- Original title: The Concise Oxford Dictionary
- Language: English
- Release number: 12th edition
- Genre: Dictionary
- Publisher: Oxford University Press
- Publication date: 18 August 2011
- Publication place: United Kingdom
- Pages: 1696
- ISBN: 978-0-19-960108-0
- Preceded by: 11th edition

The Concise Oxford English Dictionary (officially titled The Concise Oxford Dictionary until 2002, and widely abbreviated COD or COED) is one of the best-known of the 'smaller' Oxford dictionaries. The latest edition contains over 240,000 entries and 1,728 pages ("concise" compared to the OED at over 21,000 pages). Its 12th edition, published in 2011, is used by both the United Nations (UN) and NATO as the current authority for spellings in documents in English for international use. It is available as an e-book for a variety of handheld device platforms. In addition to providing information for general use, it documents local variations such as United States and United Kingdom usage.

It was started as a derivative of the Oxford English Dictionary (OED), although section S–Z had to be written before the Oxford English Dictionary reached that stage. However, starting from the 10th edition, it is based on the Oxford Dictionary of English (ODE) rather than the OED. The most recent edition is the 12th, published in 2011.

== Publications ==
=== The Concise Oxford Dictionary of Current English ===
- 1st Edition (1911): The Concise Oxford Dictionary of Current English, adapted by H. W. Fowler and F. G. Fowler ... from the Oxford Dictionary. (They wrote the last section S–Z before the Oxford English Dictionary had reached that stage.)
- 2nd Edition (1929): The Concise Oxford Dictionary of Current English H. W. Fowler alone (his brother had died in 1918, although his name is still on the title page).
- 3rd Edition: (1934) was revised by H. W. Fowler and H. G. Le Mesurier.
- 4th (1951) and 5th (1964) Editions were revised by E. McIntosh, who introduced the space-saving swung dash that stands for the headword. The title page still read The Concise Oxford Dictionary of Current English; but the description read 'edited by H. W. Fowler and F. G. Fowler; based on The Oxford Dictionary'.
- 6th (1976) and 7th (1982) Editions were still called The Concise Oxford Dictionary of Current English, but the subtitle now read based on the Oxford English dictionary and its supplements first edited by H.W. Fowler and F.G. Fowler. It was (thoroughly) edited by J.B. Sykes, catching up with the developments in the parent dictionary. In the 7th Edition, symbols were introduced to mark uses considered controversial or offensive.
- 8th Edition (1990): The Concise Oxford Dictionary of Current English, first edited by H. W. Fowler and F. G. Fowler was edited by Robert E. Allen. Being computer-based, this edition changed the original structure to a large extent.
- 9th Edition (1995): The Concise Oxford Dictionary of Current English First edited by H. W. Fowler and F. G. Fowler. Edited by Della Thompson.
- 1st Edition 100th Anniversary Edition (2011): The Concise Oxford Dictionary The 1911 First Edition includes the photocopied version of the 1st Edition dictionary, an introductory essay by renowned language expert David Crystal, a timeline of the chronology through 100 years of COED.

=== The Concise Oxford English Dictionary ===
- 10th Edition (1999, revised 2001) became The Concise Oxford English Dictionary. It was edited by Judy Pearsall. Rather than being a direct revision of the 9th edition, it was based on the larger New Oxford Dictionary of English (1998), which Pearsall had edited. Its compilation had involved a re-analysis of much of the core vocabulary using the British National Corpus. The 10th edition was also issued as an electronic resource, as a computer optical disc.

This edition was to be the last Concise Oxford Dictionary to be used on Countdown, as contestant Helen Wrigglesworth declared ROADSIDE and it was declared illegal. After further inspection from Mark Nyman, the dictionary was found to not have any compound words in it, and was thus abandoned and the show reverted to the 9th edition. The show switched to New Oxford Dictionary of English in series 43.

=== Concise Oxford English Dictionary ===
- 11th Edition (2004, revised 2006, 2008 and 2009), the Concise Oxford English Dictionary was edited by Catherine Soanes and Angus Stevenson. It was based on the Oxford Dictionary of English (2nd edition (2003), which Soanes and Stevenson had edited). The 11th Edition is available on CD-ROM as an e-book for a variety of platforms.
- 12th Edition (2011), the Concise Oxford English Dictionary was edited by Angus Stevenson and Maurice Waite. This edition included 400 new entries, including sexting, cyberbullying, gastric band, jeggings, retweet, and woot. Includes 240,000 words, phrases, and definitions; with vocabulary covering technical and scientific vocabulary and international English. It was typeset in Frutiger and Parable typefaces.

== See also ==
- Compact Oxford English Dictionary of Current English – a smaller one-volume Oxford dictionary
- Shorter Oxford English Dictionary – a larger two-volume Oxford dictionary
