= Angus Stevenson =

British lexicographer (born 1960)

Angus Stevenson (born 1959 or 1960) is a British lexicographer. Born in Essex to Scottish parents, he has worked as a dictionary editor for Oxford University Press since 1988. By 2011, he was head of dictionary projects at the press's academic division. The Times said of him that in this capacity, "it is he who decides when a new word is... well, a word."
