= Oxford English Dictionary =

Historical dictionary of the English language

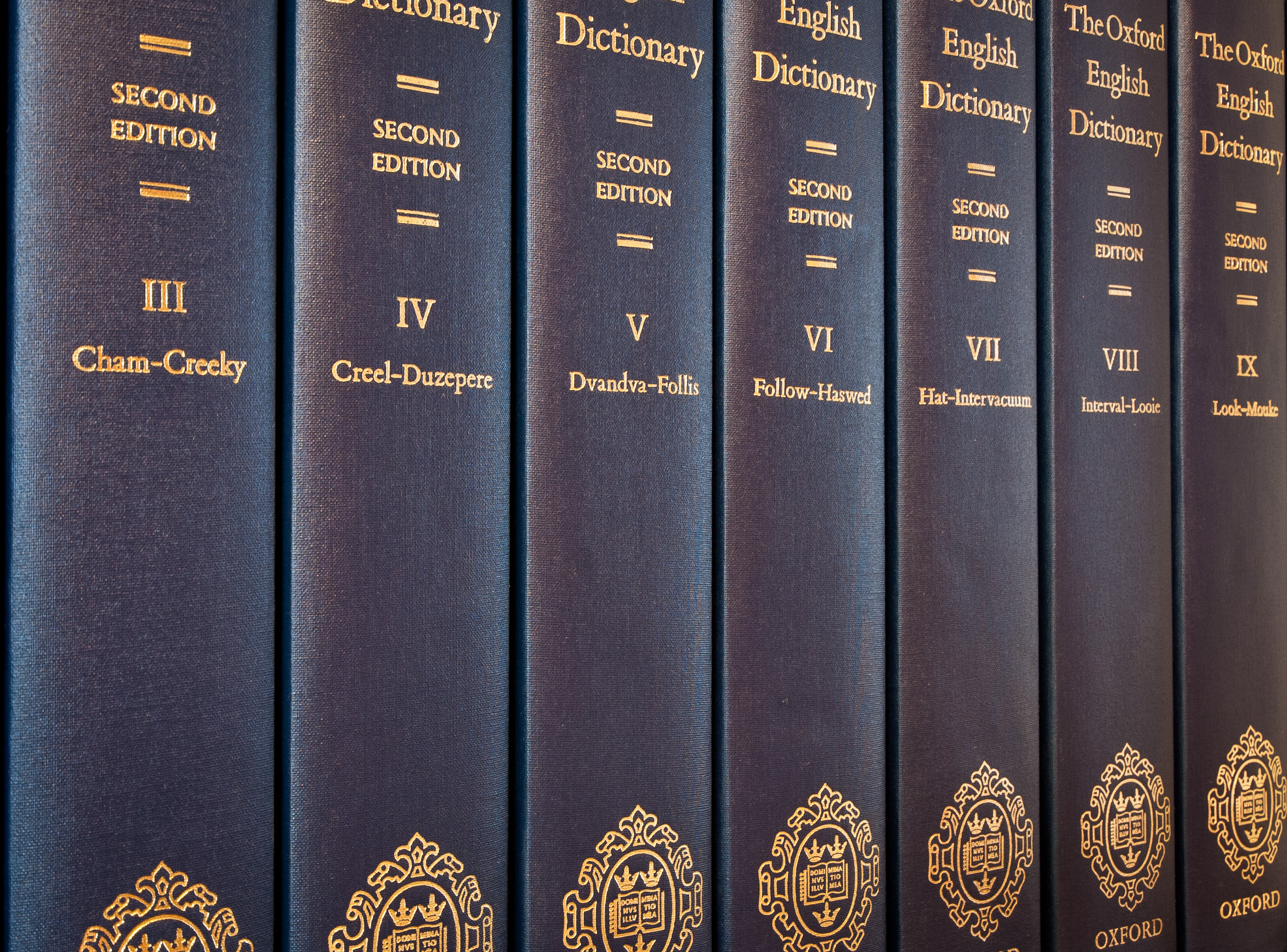
- Seven of the twenty volumes of the printed second edition of The Oxford English Dictionary (1989)
- Country: United Kingdom
- Language: English
- Publisher: Oxford University Press
- Published: 1884–1928 (first edition); 1989 (second edition); Third edition in preparation
- Website: oed.com

The Oxford English Dictionary (OED) is the principal historical dictionary of the English language, published by Oxford University Press (OUP), a University of Oxford publishing house. The dictionary, which began publication in 1884, traces the historical development of the English language, providing a comprehensive resource to scholars and academic researchers, and provides ongoing descriptions of English language usage in its variations around the world.

Work began on the dictionary in 1857, with unbound fascicles (instalments) published incrementally from 1884. The original title was A New English Dictionary on Historical Principles; Founded Mainly on the Materials Collected by The Philological Society. In 1895, the title The Oxford English Dictionary was first used unofficially on the covers of the series, and in 1928 the full dictionary was republished in 10 bound volumes.

In 1933, the title The Oxford English Dictionary fully replaced the former name in all occurrences in its reprinting as 12 volumes with a one-volume supplement.

More supplements came over the years until 1989, when the second edition was published, comprising 21,728 pages in 20 volumes.

Since 2000, compilation of a third edition of the dictionary has been underway, approximately half of which was complete as of 2018. In 1988, the first electronic version of the dictionary was made available, and the online version has been available since 2000. By April 2014, it was receiving over two million visits per month. The third edition of the dictionary is expected to be available exclusively in electronic form; the CEO of OUP has stated that it is unlikely that it will ever be printed.

== Historical nature ==
As a historical dictionary, the Oxford English Dictionary features entries in which the earliest ascertainable recorded sense of a word, whether current or obsolete, is presented first, and each additional sense is presented in historical order according to the date of its earliest ascertainable recorded use. Following each definition are several brief illustrating quotations presented in chronological order from the earliest ascertainable use of the word in that sense to the last ascertainable use for an obsolete sense, to indicate both its life span and the time since its desuetude, or to a relatively recent use for current ones.

The format of the OED's entries has influenced numerous other historical lexicography projects. The forerunners to the OED, such as the early volumes of the Deutsches Wörterbuch, had initially provided few quotations from a limited number of sources, whereas the OED editors preferred larger groups of quite short quotations from a wide selection of authors and publications. This influenced later volumes of this and other lexicographical works.

== Entries and relative size ==
Diagram of the types of English vocabulary included in the OED, devised by James Murray, its first editor

As of January 2026, the Oxford English Dictionary contained 520,779 entries, 888,251 meanings, 3,927,862 quotations, and 821,712 thesaurus entries. The dictionary's latest, complete print edition (second edition, 1989) was printed in 20 volumes, comprising 291,500 entries in 21,730 pages. The longest entry in the OED2 was for the verb set, which required 60,000 words to describe some 580 senses (430 for the bare verb, the rest in phrasal verbs and idioms). As entries began to be revised for the OED3 in sequence starting from M, the record was progressively broken by the verbs make in 2000, then put in 2007, then run in 2011 with 645 senses.

Despite its considerable size, the OED is neither the world's largest nor the earliest exhaustive dictionary of a language. Another earlier large dictionary is the Grimm brothers' 33-volume dictionary of the German language, Deutsches Wörterbuch, begun in 1838 and completed in 1961. The first edition of the Vocabolario degli Accademici della Crusca is the first great dictionary devoted to a modern European language (Italian) and was published in 1612; the first edition of Dictionnaire de l'Académie française dates from 1694. The official dictionary of Spanish is the Diccionario de la lengua española (produced, edited, and published by the Royal Spanish Academy), and its first edition was published in 1780. The Kangxi Dictionary of Chinese was published in 1716. The largest dictionary by number of pages is believed to be the Dutch Woordenboek der Nederlandsche Taal. By number of definitions the online dictionary Wiktionary has the most, with 1,680,897 English definitions and 11,361,634 total definitions across all languages as of January 2026.

== History ==
Oxford English Dictionary Publications
Publication date	Volume range	Title	Volume
1888	A and B	A New ED	Vol. 1
1893	C	NED	Vol. 2
1897	D and E	NED	Vol. 3
1900	F and G	NED	Vol. 4
1901	H to K	NED	Vol. 5
1908	L to N	NED	Vol. 6
1909	O and P	NED	Vol. 7
1914	Q to Sh	NED	Vol. 8
1919	Si to St	NED	Vol. 9/1
1919	Su to Th	NED	Vol. 9/2
1926	Ti to U	NED	Vol. 10/1
1928	V to Z	NED	Vol. 10/2
1928	All	NED	10 vols.
1933	All	NED	Suppl.
1933	All	Oxford ED	13 vols.
1972	A to G	OED Sup.	Vol. 1
1976	H to N	OED Sup.	Vol. 2
1982	O to Sa	OED Sup.	Vol. 3
1986	Se to Z	OED Sup.	Vol. 4
1989	All	OED 2nd Ed.	20 vols.
1993	All	OED Add. Ser.	Vols. 1–2
1997	All	OED Add. Ser.	Vol. 3

=== Origins ===
The dictionary began as a Philological Society project of a small group of intellectuals in London (and unconnected to Oxford University): Richard Chenevix Trench, Herbert Coleridge, and Frederick Furnivall, who were dissatisfied with the existing English dictionaries. The society expressed interest in compiling a new dictionary as early as 1844, but it was not until June 1857 that they began by forming an "Unregistered Words Committee" to search for words that were unlisted or poorly defined in current dictionaries. In November, Trench's report was not a list of unregistered words; instead, it was the study On Some Deficiencies in our English Dictionaries, which identified seven distinct shortcomings in contemporary dictionaries:

- Incomplete coverage of obsolete words
- Inconsistent coverage of families of related words
- Incorrect dates for earliest use of words
- History of obsolete senses of words often omitted
- Inadequate distinction among synonyms
- Insufficient use of good illustrative quotations
- Space wasted on inappropriate or redundant content.

The society ultimately realized that the number of unlisted words would be far more than the number of words in the English dictionaries of the 19th century, and shifted their idea from covering only words that were not already in English dictionaries to a larger project. Trench suggested that a new, truly comprehensive dictionary was needed. On 7 January 1858, the society formally adopted the idea of a comprehensive new dictionary. Volunteer readers would be assigned particular books, copying passages illustrating word usage onto quotation slips. Later the same year, the society agreed to the project in principle, with the title A New English Dictionary on Historical Principles (NED).

=== Early editors ===
Richard Chenevix Trench (1807–1886) played the key role in the project's first months, but his appointment as Dean of Westminster meant that he could not give the dictionary project the time that it required. He withdrew and Herbert Coleridge became the first editor.

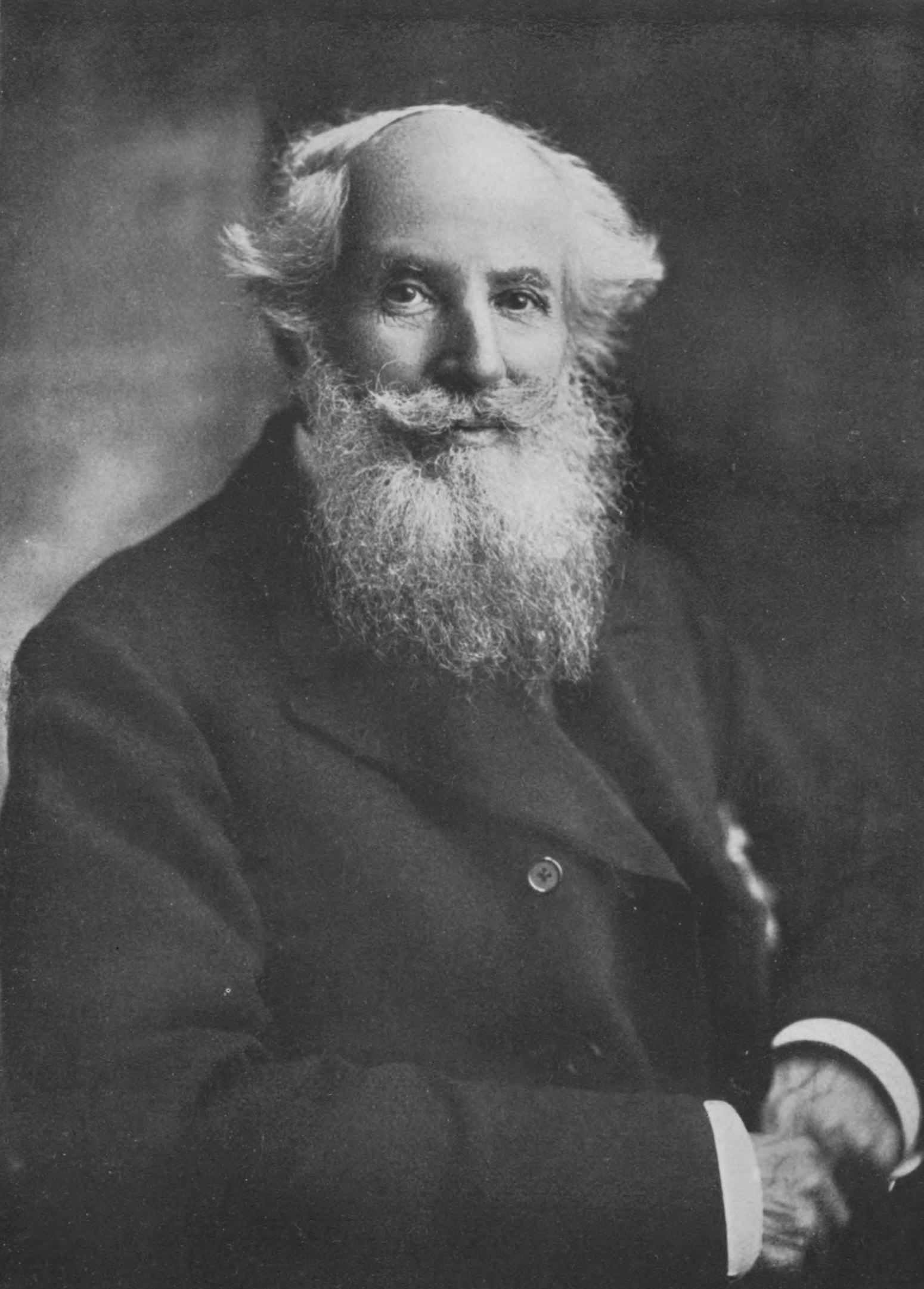
Frederick Furnivall, 1825–1910

On 12 May 1860, Coleridge's dictionary plan was published and research was started. His house was the first editorial office. He arrayed 100,000 quotation slips in a 54 pigeon-hole grid. In April 1861, the group published the first sample pages; later that month, Coleridge died of tuberculosis, aged 30.

Thereupon Furnivall became editor; he was enthusiastic and knowledgeable, but temperamentally ill-suited for the work. Many volunteer readers eventually lost interest in the project, as Furnivall failed to keep them motivated. Furthermore, many of the slips were misplaced.

Furnivall believed that, since many printed texts from earlier centuries were not readily available, it would be impossible for volunteers to efficiently locate the quotations that the dictionary needed. As a result, he founded the Early English Text Society in 1864 and the Chaucer Society in 1868 to publish old manuscripts. Furnivall's preparatory efforts lasted 21 years and provided numerous texts for the use and enjoyment of the general public, as well as crucial sources for lexicographers, but they did not actually involve compiling a dictionary. Furnivall recruited more than 800 volunteers to read these texts and record quotations. While enthusiastic, the volunteers were not well trained and often made inconsistent and arbitrary selections. Ultimately, Furnivall handed over nearly two tons of quotation slips and other materials to his successor.

In the 1870s, Furnivall unsuccessfully attempted to recruit both Henry Sweet and Henry Nicol to succeed him. He then approached James Murray, who accepted the post of editor. In the late 1870s, Furnivall and Murray met with several publishers about publishing the dictionary. In 1878, Oxford University Press agreed with Murray to proceed with the massive project; the agreement was formalized the following year. 20 years after its conception, the dictionary project finally had a publisher. It would take another 50 years to complete.

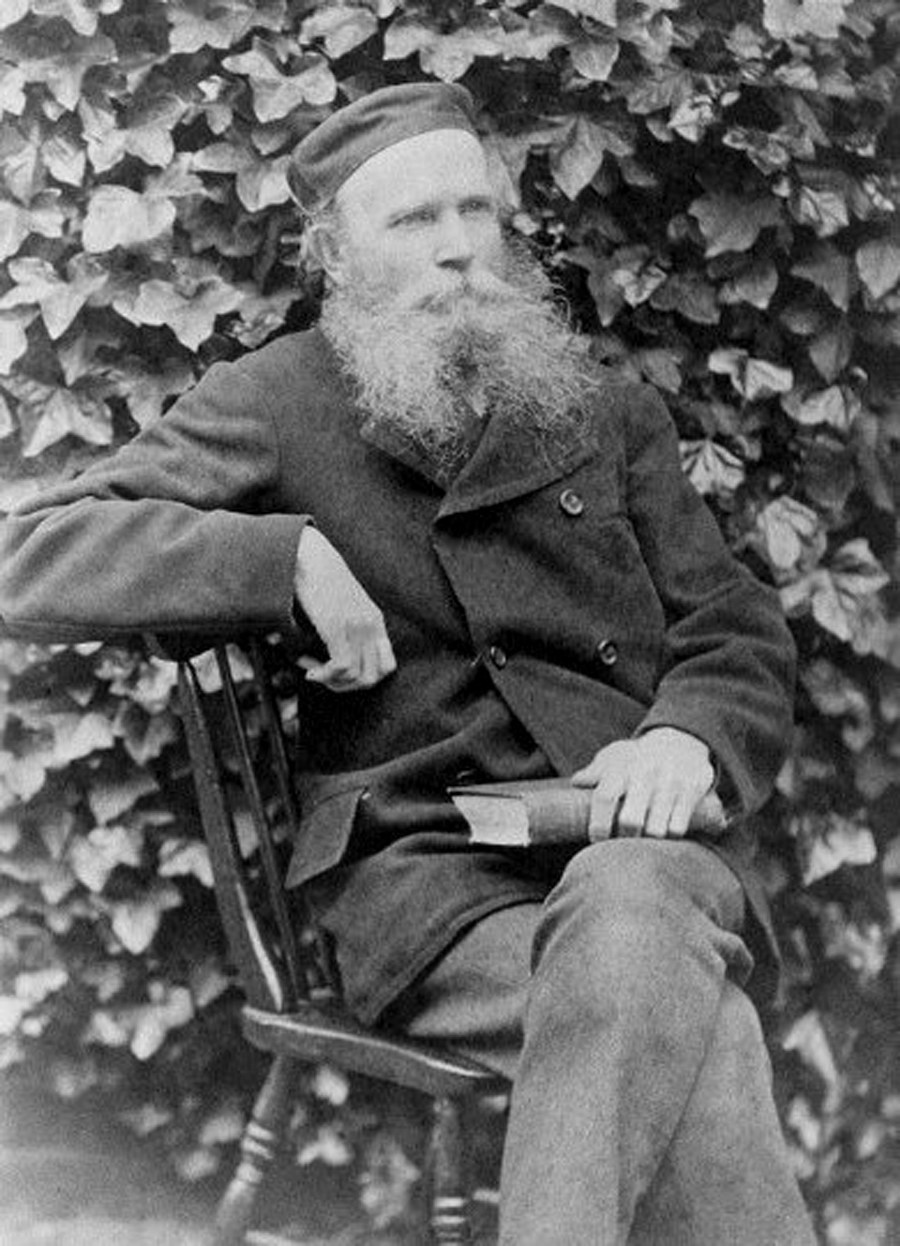
William Chester Minor, 1834–1920

Late in his editorship, Murray learned that one especially prolific reader, W. C. Minor, was confined to a mental hospital for (in modern terminology) schizophrenia. Minor was a Yale University–trained surgeon and a military officer in the American Civil War who had been confined to Broadmoor Asylum for the Criminally Insane after killing a man in London. He invented his own quotation-tracking system, allowing him to submit slips on specific words in response to editors' requests. The story of how Murray and Minor worked together to advance the OED was retold in the 1998 book The Surgeon of Crowthorne (US title: The Professor and the Madman), which was the basis for a 2019 film, The Professor and the Madman, starring Mel Gibson and Sean Penn.

=== Oxford editors ===
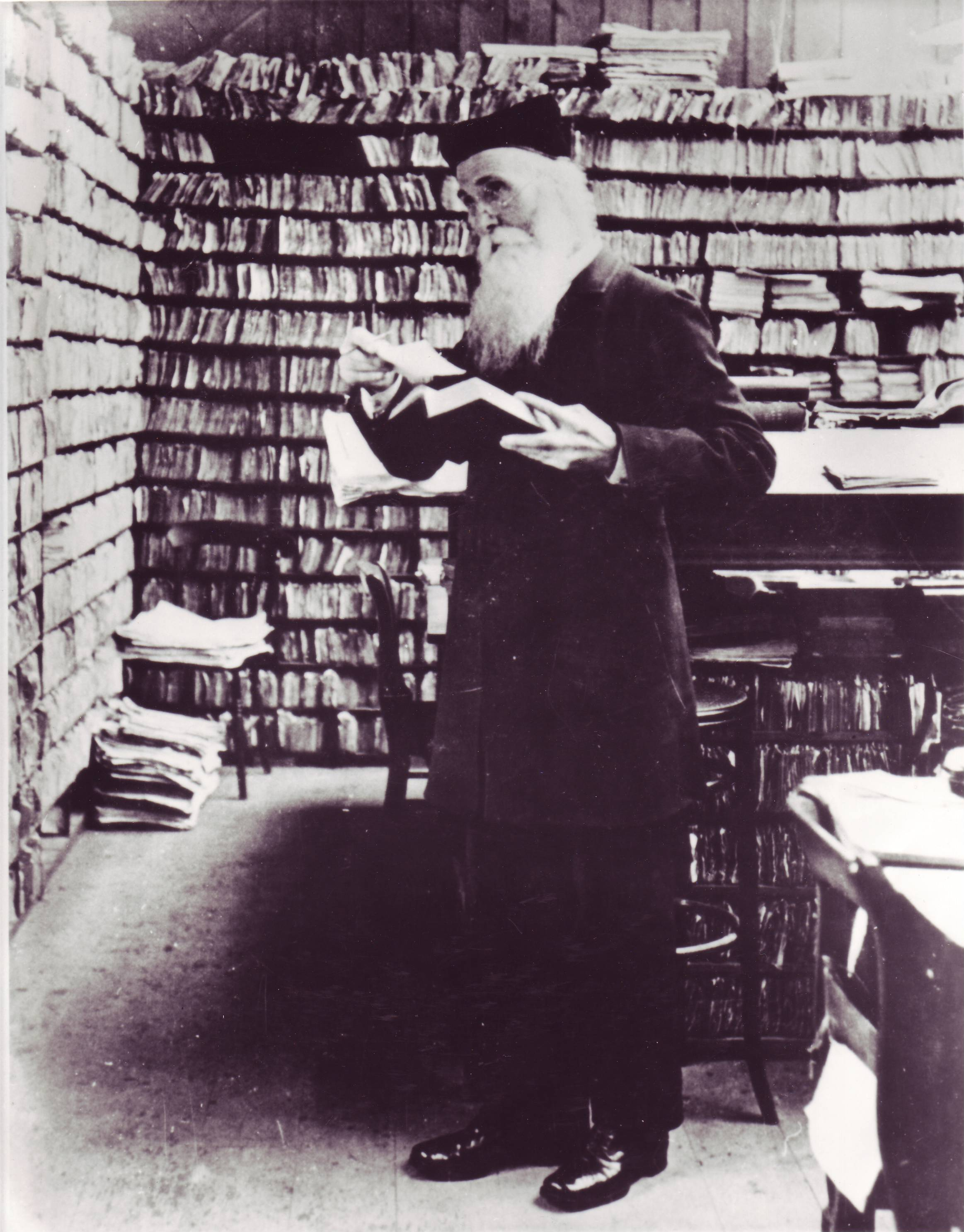
James Murray in the Scriptorium at Banbury Road

During the 1870s, the Philological Society was concerned with the process of publishing a dictionary with such an immense scope. They had pages printed by publishers, but no publication agreement was reached; both the Cambridge University Press and the Oxford University Press were approached. The OUP finally agreed in 1879 (after two years of negotiating by Sweet, Furnivall, and Murray) to publish the dictionary and to pay Murray, who was both the editor and the Philological Society president. The dictionary was to be published as interval fascicles, with the final form in four volumes, totalling 6,400 pages. They hoped to finish the project in ten years.

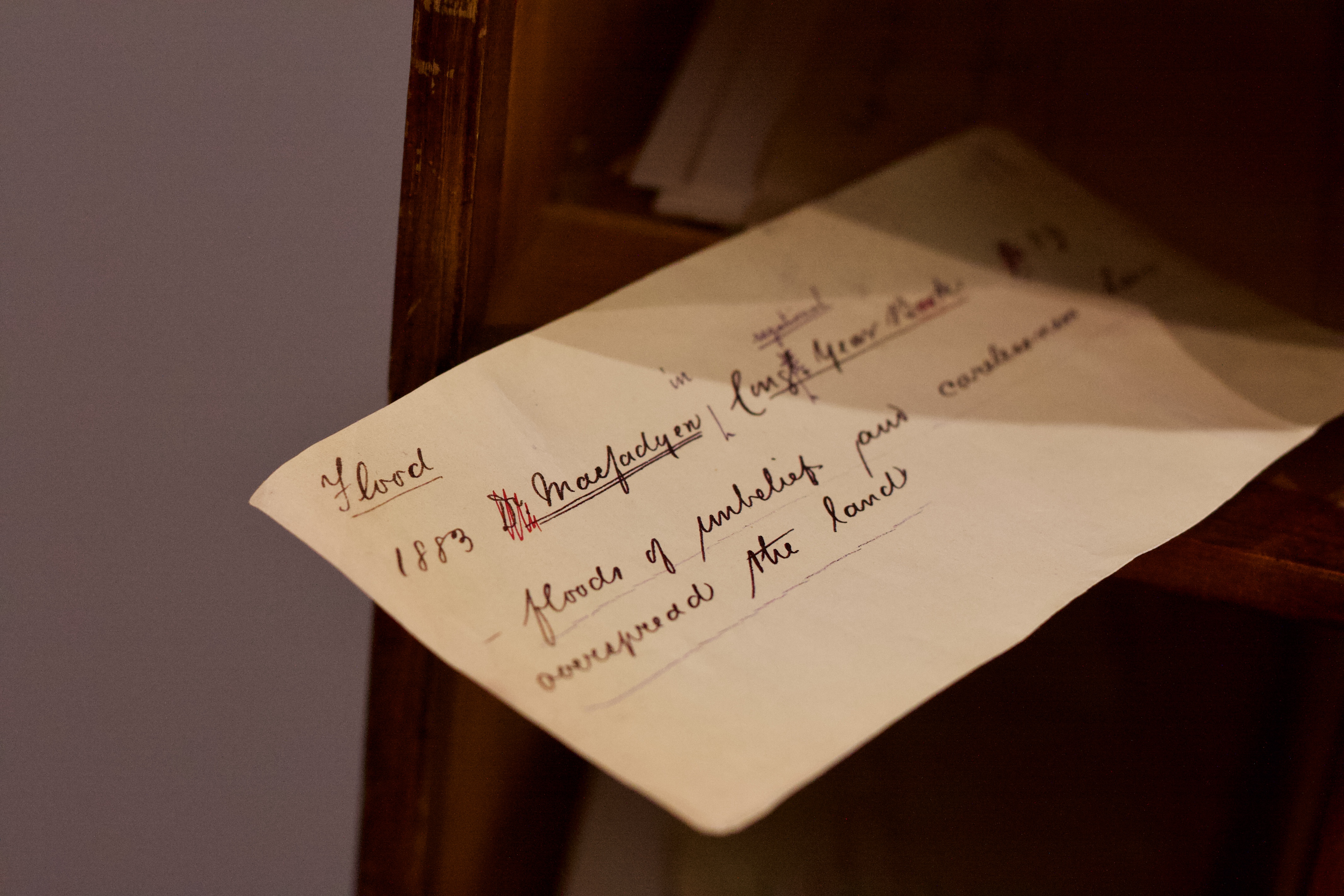
A quotation slip as used in the compilation of the OED, illustrating the word flood

Murray started the project, working in a corrugated iron outbuilding called the "Scriptorium" which was lined with wooden planks, bookshelves, and 1,029 pigeon-holes for the quotation slips. He tracked and regathered Furnivall's collection of quotation slips, which were found to concentrate on rare, interesting words rather than common usages. For instance, there were ten times as many quotations for abusion as for abuse. He appealed, through newspapers distributed to bookshops and libraries, for readers who would report "as many quotations as you can for ordinary words" and for words that were "rare, obsolete, old-fashioned, new, peculiar or used in a peculiar way". Murray had American philologist and liberal arts college professor Francis March manage the collection in North America; 1,000 quotation slips arrived daily to the Scriptorium and, by 1880, there were 2,500,000.

The first dictionary fascicle was published on 1 February 1884—twenty-three years after Coleridge's sample pages. The full title was A New English Dictionary on Historical Principles; Founded Mainly on the Materials Collected by The Philological Society; the 352-page volume, words from A to Ant, cost 12s 6d (equivalent to $67 in 2025). The total sales were only 4,000 copies.

The OUP saw that it would take too long to complete the work unless editorial arrangements were revised. Accordingly, new assistants were hired, and two new demands were made on Murray. The first was that he move from Mill Hill to Oxford to work full-time on the project, which he did in 1885. Murray had his Scriptorium re-erected in the back garden of his new property.

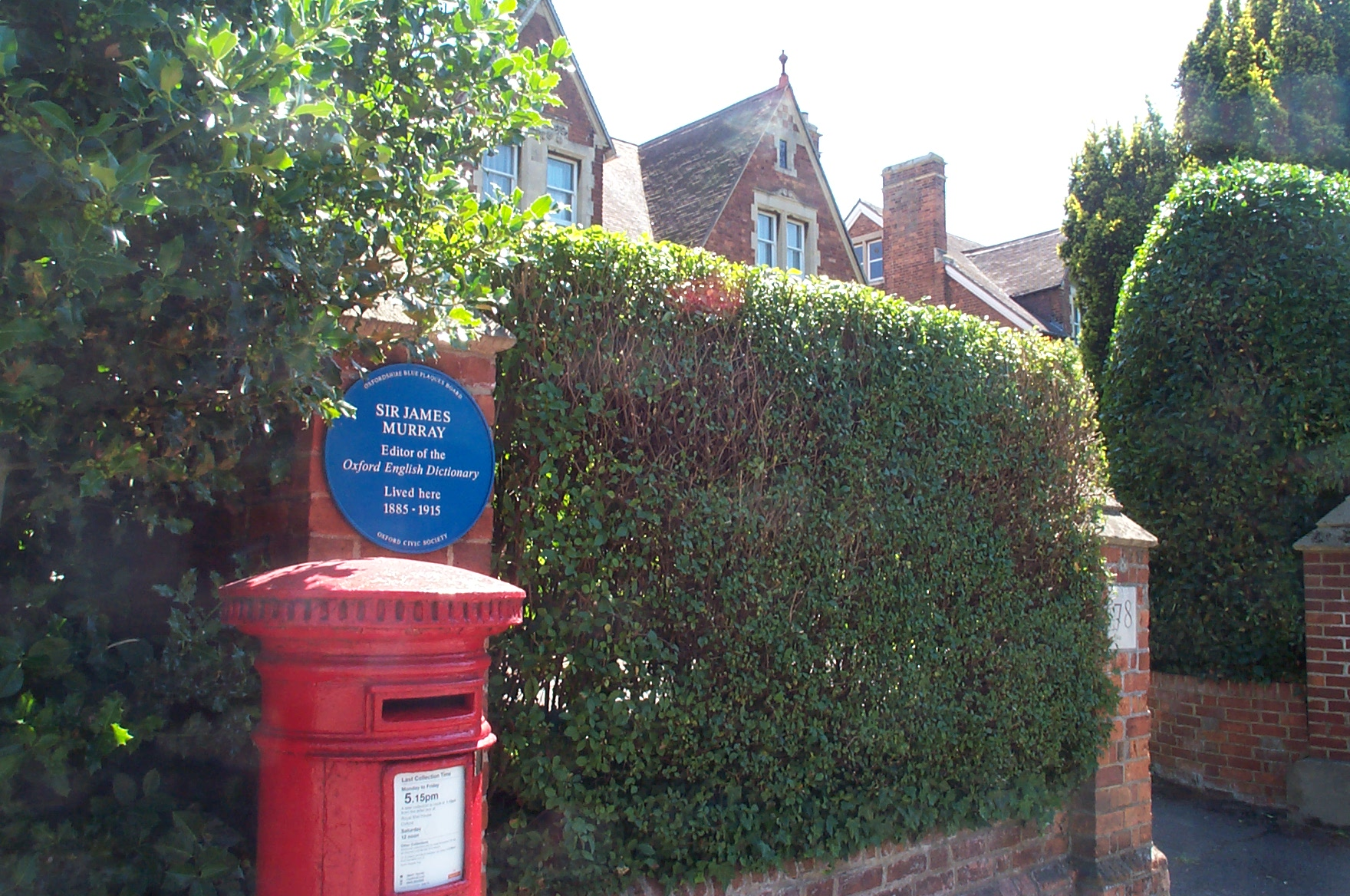
78 Banbury Road, former home of James Murray, marked with an Oxfordshire Blue Plaque

Murray resisted the second demand: that if he could not meet the schedule, he must hire a second, senior editor to work in parallel to him, outside his supervision, on words from elsewhere in the alphabet. Murray did not want to share the work, feeling that he would accelerate his work pace with experience. That turned out not to be so, and Philip Gell of the OUP forced the promotion of Murray's assistant Henry Bradley (hired by Murray in 1884), who worked independently in the British Museum in London beginning in 1888. In 1896, Bradley moved to Oxford University.

Gell continued harassing Murray and Bradley with his business concerns – containing costs and speeding production – to the point where the project's collapse seemed likely. Newspapers reported the harassment, particularly the Saturday Review, and public opinion backed the editors. Gell was fired, and the university reversed his cost policies. If the editors felt that the dictionary would have to grow larger, it would; it was an important work, and worth the time and money to finish properly.

=== Further progress ===
Neither Murray nor Bradley lived to see it. Murray died in 1915, having been responsible for words starting with A–D, H–K, O–P, and T, nearly half the finished dictionary; Bradley died in 1923, having completed E–G, L–M, S–Sh, St, and W–We. By then, two additional editors had been promoted from assistant work to independent work, continuing without much trouble. William Craigie started in 1901 and was responsible for N, Q–R, Si–Sq, U–V, and Wo–Wy. The OUP had previously thought London was too far from Oxford but, after 1925, Craigie worked on the dictionary in Chicago, where he was a professor. The fourth editor was Charles Talbut Onions, who compiled the remaining ranges starting in 1914: Su–Sz, Wh–Wo, and X–Z.

In 1919–1920, J. R. R. Tolkien was employed by the OED, researching etymologies of the Waggle to Warlock range; later he parodied the principal editors as "The Four Wise Clerks of Oxenford" in the story Farmer Giles of Ham.

By early 1894, a total of 11 fascicles had been published, or about one per year: four for A–B, five for C, and two for E. Of these, eight were 352 pages long, while the last one in each group was shorter to end at the letter break (which eventually became a volume break). At this point, it was decided to publish the work in smaller and more frequent instalments: once every three months beginning in 1895 there would be a fascicle of 64 pages, priced at 2s 6d. If enough material was ready, 128 or even 192 pages would be published together. This pace was maintained until World War I forced reductions in staff. Each time enough consecutive pages were available, the same material was also published in the original larger fascicles. Also in 1895, the title Oxford English Dictionary was first used. It then appeared only on the outer covers of the fascicles; the original title was still the official one and was used everywhere else.

=== Completion of first edition and first supplement ===
The 125th and last fascicle covered words from Wise to the end of W and was published on 19 April 1928, and the full dictionary in bound volumes followed immediately. William Shakespeare is the most-quoted writer in the completed dictionary, with Hamlet his most-quoted work. George Eliot (Mary Ann Evans) is the most-quoted female writer. Collectively, the Bible is the most-quoted work (in many translations); the most-quoted single work is Cursor Mundi.

Additional material for a given letter range continued to be gathered after the corresponding fascicle was printed, with a view towards inclusion in a supplement or revised edition. A one-volume supplement of such material was published in 1933, with entries weighted towards the start of the alphabet where the fascicles were decades old. The supplement included at least one word (bondmaid) accidentally omitted when its slips were misplaced; many words and senses newly coined (famously appendicitis, coined in 1886 and missing from the 1885 fascicle, which came to prominence when Edward VII's 1902 appendicitis postponed his coronation); and some previously excluded as too obscure (notoriously radium, omitted in 1903, months before its discoverers Pierre and Marie Curie won the Nobel Prize in Physics). Also in 1933 the original fascicles of the entire dictionary were re-issued, bound into 12 volumes, under the title "The Oxford English Dictionary". This edition of 13 volumes including the supplement was subsequently reprinted in 1961 and 1970.

=== A Supplement to the Oxford English Dictionary ===
In 1933, Oxford had finally put the dictionary to rest; all work ended, and the quotation slips went into storage. However, the English language continued to change and, by 20 years later, the dictionary was outdated.

There were three possible ways to update it. The cheapest would have been to leave the existing work alone and simply compile a new supplement of perhaps one or two volumes, but then anyone looking for a word or sense and unsure of its age would have to look in three different places. The most convenient choice for the user would have been for the entire dictionary to be re-edited and retypeset, with each change included in its proper alphabetical place; but this would have been the most expensive option, with perhaps 15 volumes required to be produced. The OUP chose a middle approach: combining the new material with the existing supplement to form a larger replacement supplement.

Robert Burchfield was hired in 1957 to edit the second supplement; Charles Talbut Onions turned 84 that year but was still able to make some contributions as well. The work on the supplement was expected to take about seven years. It actually took 29 years, by which time the new supplement (OEDS) had grown to four volumes, starting with A, H, O, and Se. They were published in 1972, 1976, 1982, and 1986 respectively, bringing the complete dictionary to 16 volumes, or 17 counting the first supplement.

Burchfield emphasized the inclusion of modern-day language and, through the supplement, the dictionary was expanded to include a wealth of new words from the burgeoning fields of science and technology, as well as popular culture and colloquial speech. Burchfield said that he broadened the scope to include developments of the language in English-speaking regions beyond the United Kingdom, including North America, Australia, New Zealand, South Africa, India, Pakistan, and the Caribbean. Burchfield also removed, for unknown reasons, many entries that had been added to the 1933 supplement. In 2012, an analysis by lexicographer Sarah Ogilvie revealed that many of these entries were foreign loan words, despite Burchfield's claim that he included more such words. The proportion was estimated from a sample calculation to amount to 17% of the foreign loan words and words from regional forms of English. Some of these had only a single recorded usage, but many had multiple recorded citations, and it ran against what was thought to be the established OED editorial practice and a perception that he had opened up the dictionary to "World English".

=== Second edition ===
Oxford English Dictionary
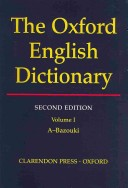
- Second edition
- Editor: John Simpson and Edmund Weiner
- Language: English
- Subject: Dictionary
- Publisher: Oxford University Press
- Publication date: 30 March 1989
- Publication place: United Kingdom
- Pages: 21,730
- ISBN: 978-0-19-861186-8
- OCLC: 17648714
- Dewey Decimal: 423 19
- LC Class: PE1625 .O87 1989

As work on the supplement neared completion, the management of Oxford University Press began to consider the future of the OED. The copyright of the 1933 first edition of the dictionary was due to come to an end in 1983. There was also a desire to retain, for the benefit of the future development of Oxford dictionaries, the skilled team of lexicographers employed by the Press. Crucially, there was a widely recognized need to revise the dictionary. As a solution to these issues, integration of the first edition and the supplement into one dictionary (which could then be revised) became a priority, though how this should be achieved was uncertain.

Richard Charkin, Head of Reference at the OUP, argued in favour of computerizing the two texts, and subsequently combining and editing them electronically. Burchfield commissioned research into the activities and resources that would be required to revise and update the OED using computer technology, which concluded that the conversion and integration of the texts was feasible.

In order to find the expertise necessary for the project, in June 1983 a request for tender was submitted by the OUP to various computer companies, software houses, government agencies, and academic departments. Many responses were received; Charkin and OED editor Edmund Weiner made numerous visits in the UK and North America. It was determined that no single agency could carry out the whole task, and that the OUP would have to take on the central managing role. For this purpose a department, known as the New OED Project, was set up under Tim Benbow, with Weiner and John Simpson as co-editors of the new dictionary.

The project was divided into two phases:

1. Merging the first edition and the supplement.
2. Full revision and updating of the OED.

After the first phase, the integrated edition was to be published on paper – and subsequently in electronic form – as the second edition of the OED. The second phase, a proper revision of the dictionary that would create a third edition, was deferred to a later stage.

As partners assisting in the project, the International Computaprint Corporation (now Reed Tech) was chosen to carry out the conversion of the text into electronic form; IBM UK were to supply software and hardware and assist with the building of a computer system for integrating the texts; and the University of Waterloo in Ontario, Canada agreed to work on designing a database system for updating and disseminating the OED after integration. The university set up the Centre for the New Oxford English Dictionary, led by Frank Tompa and Gaston Gonnet; this project went on to become the basis for the Open Text Corporation. A. Walton Litz, an English professor at Princeton University who served on the Oxford University Press advisory council, was quoted in Time as saying "I've never been associated with a project, I've never even heard of a project, that was so incredibly complicated and that met every deadline."

Electronic conversion of the text was done by keyboarding. Optical character recognition was not practical due to the poor quality of the printed text of the first edition. Mark-up was then introduced into the text: ICC typists entered a system of tags into the text that included major structural tags (such as headword, pronunciation, etymology, sense section, quotation etc.) as well as typographic tags. This mark-up would add to the dictionary "a whole new world of information". According to Weiner:

The aim from the start, then, was to transform the text into an electronic database, in which every part of the text had its own identifying tag; these tags would form the basis both for complex text searching and for versatile text representation.

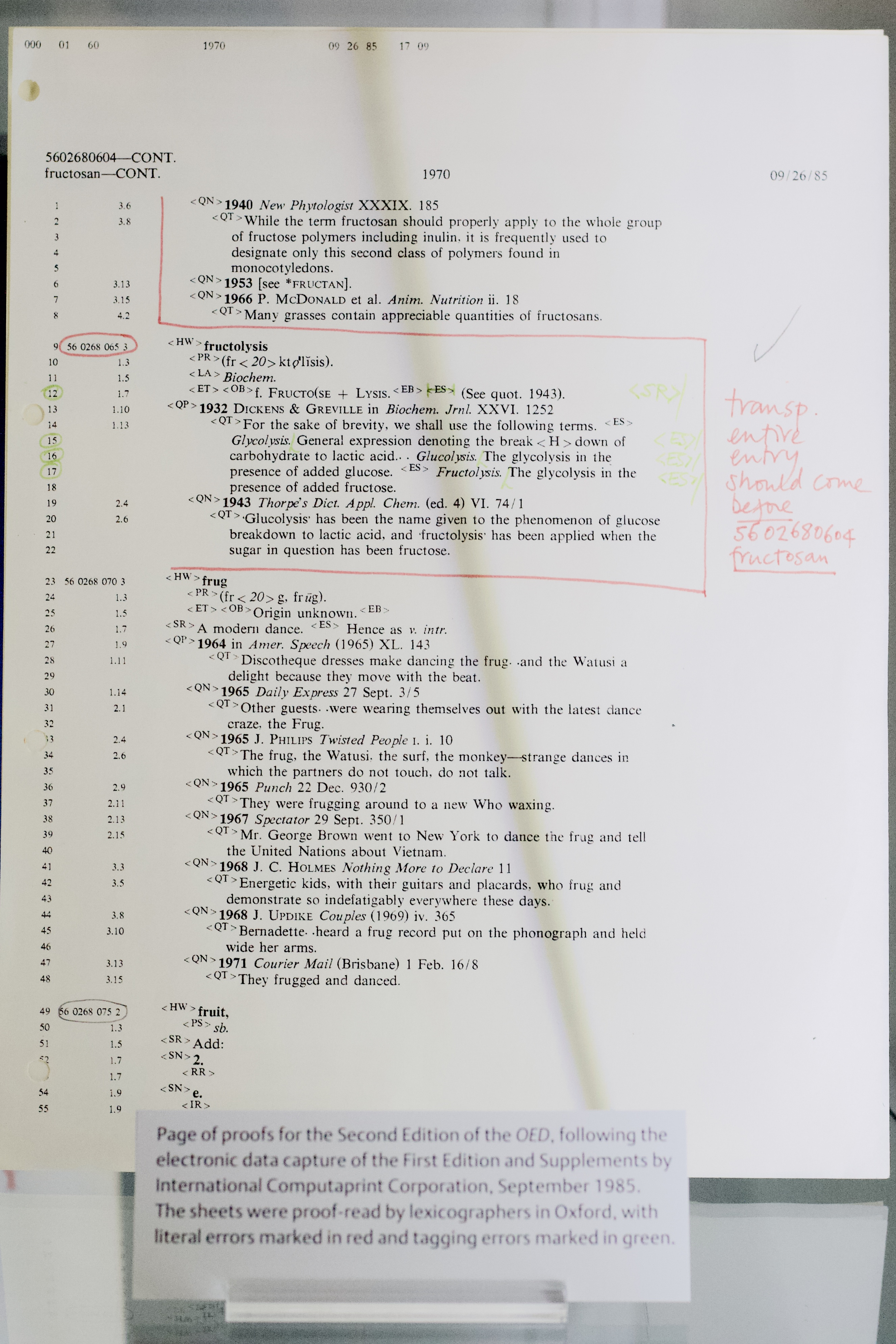
A printout of the SGML markup used in the computerization of the OED, showing pencil annotations used to mark corrections

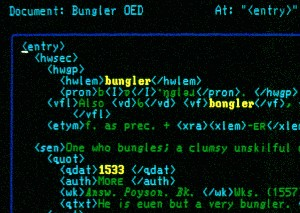
Editing an entry of the NOED using LEXX

18 monthly batches of proofs were returned to Oxford between 1985 and 1986, and checked by over 50 proof-readers. In all, 350 million characters were keyed, taking 120 person-years; proof-reading took a total of 60 person-years.

The dictionary text was treated as a language with a rule-governed syntax, and a grammar of the text was written at Oxford. The text was parsed by a parser developed by the research group at the University of Waterloo. The tagging system was automatically converted to adopt SGML conventions.

The integration of the two texts was largely automated; complete entries from the supplement were easily slotted into place in the integrated text. In order to integrate partial entries, a software component was built that used the mark-up to match corresponding pieces of text by headword, part of speech, homonym number and sense number. This process was facilitated by instructions already present in the printed text of the supplement, such as "add to def.:", followed by supplementary definition text. Automatic integration was completed in May 1987; it successfully handled about 80 per cent of the text, saving 50–60 per cent of manual editorial and keyboarding work.

Since programs to edit large textual databases had not been developed, a program named LEXX was developed for the project by IBM scientist Mike Cowlishaw, and renamed OEDIPUS ("OED Integration, Publishing, and Updating System").

The target addresses of many cross-references would be invalidated by the integration, for example due to updated sense numbers. Cross-references were therefore identified by the parser and numbered; after integration, they were checked against their targets and adjusted where appropriate. The headword of each entry was no longer capitalized, allowing the user to readily see those words that actually require a capital letter. Murray had devised his own notation for pronunciation, there being no standard available at the time, whereas the OED2 adopted the modern International Phonetic Alphabet. Unlike the earlier edition, all foreign alphabets except Greek were transliterated.

The word "new" was again dropped from the name, and the OED2 was published on paper in 20 volumes in March 1989, with 21,730 pages, 290,500 entries, and 59 million words of text. Supplementing the entry headwords, there are 157,000 bold-type combinations and derivatives, 169,000 italicized-bold phrases and combinations, making a total of 616,500 word-forms. There are 137,000 pronunciations, 249,300 etymologies, 577,000 cross-references, and 2,412,400 usage quotations. According to the publishers, the text required 540 megabytes of electronic storage.

Up to a very late stage, all the volumes of the first edition were started on initial letter boundaries. For the second edition, there was no attempt to start them on letter boundaries, and they were made roughly equal in size. The 20 volumes started with A, B.B.C., Cham, Creel, Dvandva, Follow, Hat, Interval, Look, Moul, Ow, Poise, Quemadero, Rob, Ser, Soot, Su, Thru, Unemancipated, and Wave. On top of integration, five thousand new words and senses were included in the new edition. The first edition retronymically became the OED1. Following page 832 of Volume XX, Wave-Zyxt, there is a 143-page separately paginated bibliography. This is a conflation of the bibliography of OED1 with that of the 1986 Supplement.

When the print version of the second edition was published in 1989, the response was enthusiastic. Author Anthony Burgess declared it "the greatest publishing event of the century", as quoted by the Los Angeles Times. Time dubbed the book "a scholarly Everest", and Richard Boston, writing for The Guardian, called it "one of the wonders of the world".

=== Additions Series ===
The supplements and their integration into the second edition were a great improvement to the OED as a whole, but it was recognized that most of the entries were still fundamentally unaltered from the first edition. Much of the information in the dictionary published in 1989 was already decades out of date, though the supplements had made good progress towards incorporating new vocabulary. Yet many definitions contained disproven scientific theories, outdated historical information, and moral values that were no longer widely accepted. Furthermore, the supplements had failed to recognize many words in the existing volumes as obsolete by the time of the second edition's publication, meaning that thousands of words were marked as current despite no recent evidence of their use.

Accordingly, it was recognized that work on a third edition would have to begin to rectify these problems. The first attempt to produce a new edition came with the Oxford English Dictionary Additions Series, a new set of supplements to complement the OED2 with the intention of producing a third edition from them. The previous supplements appeared in alphabetical instalments, whereas the new series had a full A–Z range of entries within each individual volume, with a complete alphabetical index at the end of all words revised so far, each listed with the volume number which contained the revised entry.

However, in the end only three Additions volumes were published this way, two in 1993 and one in 1997, each containing about 3,000 new definitions. The possibilities of the World Wide Web and new computer technology in general meant that the processes of researching the dictionary and of publishing new and revised entries could be vastly improved. New text search databases offered vastly more material for the editors of the dictionary to work with, and with publication on the Web as a possibility, the editors could publish revised entries much more quickly and easily than ever before. A new approach was called for, and for this reason it was decided to embark on a new, complete revision of the dictionary.

=== Third edition ===
Beginning with the launch of the first OED Online site in 2000, the editors of the dictionary began a major revision project to create a completely revised third edition of the dictionary (OED3), expected to be completed in 2037 at a projected cost of circa £34 million.

Revisions were started at the letter M, with new material appearing every three months on the OED Online website. The editors chose to start the revision project from the middle of the dictionary in order that the overall quality of entries be made more even, since the later entries in the OED1 generally tended to be better than the earlier ones. However, in March 2008, the editors announced that they would alternate each quarter between moving forward in the alphabet as before and updating "key English words from across the alphabet, along with the other words which make up the alphabetical cluster surrounding them". With the relaunch of the OED Online website in December 2010, alphabetical revision was abandoned altogether.

The revision is expected roughly to double the dictionary in size. Apart from general updates to include information on new words and other changes in the language, the third edition brings many other improvements, including changes in formatting and stylistic conventions for easier reading and computerized searching, more etymological information, and a general change of focus away from individual words towards more general coverage of the language as a whole. While the original text drew its quotations mainly from literary sources such as novels, plays, and poetry, with additional material from newspapers and academic journals, the new edition will reference more kinds of material that were unavailable to the editors of previous editions, such as wills, inventories, account books, diaries, journals, and letters.

John Simpson was the first chief editor of the OED3. He retired in 2013 and was replaced by Michael Proffitt, who is the eighth chief editor of the dictionary.

The production of the new edition exploits computer technology, particularly since the inauguration in June 2005 of the "Perfect All-Singing All-Dancing Editorial and Notation Application", or "Pasadena". With this XML-based system, lexicographers can spend less effort on presentation issues such as the numbering of definitions. This system has also simplified the use of the quotations database, and enabled staff in New York to work directly on the dictionary in the same way as their Oxford-based counterparts.

Other important computer uses include internet searches for evidence of current usage and email submissions of quotations by readers and the general public.

==== New entries and words ====
Wordhunt was a 2005 appeal to the general public for help in providing citations for 50 selected recent words, and produced antedatings for many. The results were reported in a BBC TV series, Balderdash and Piffle. The OED's readers contribute quotations: the department currently receives about 200,000 a year.

OED currently contains over 500,000 entries. The online OED is updated on a quarterly basis, with the addition of new words and senses, and the revision of existing entries.

== Formats ==
=== Compact editions ===
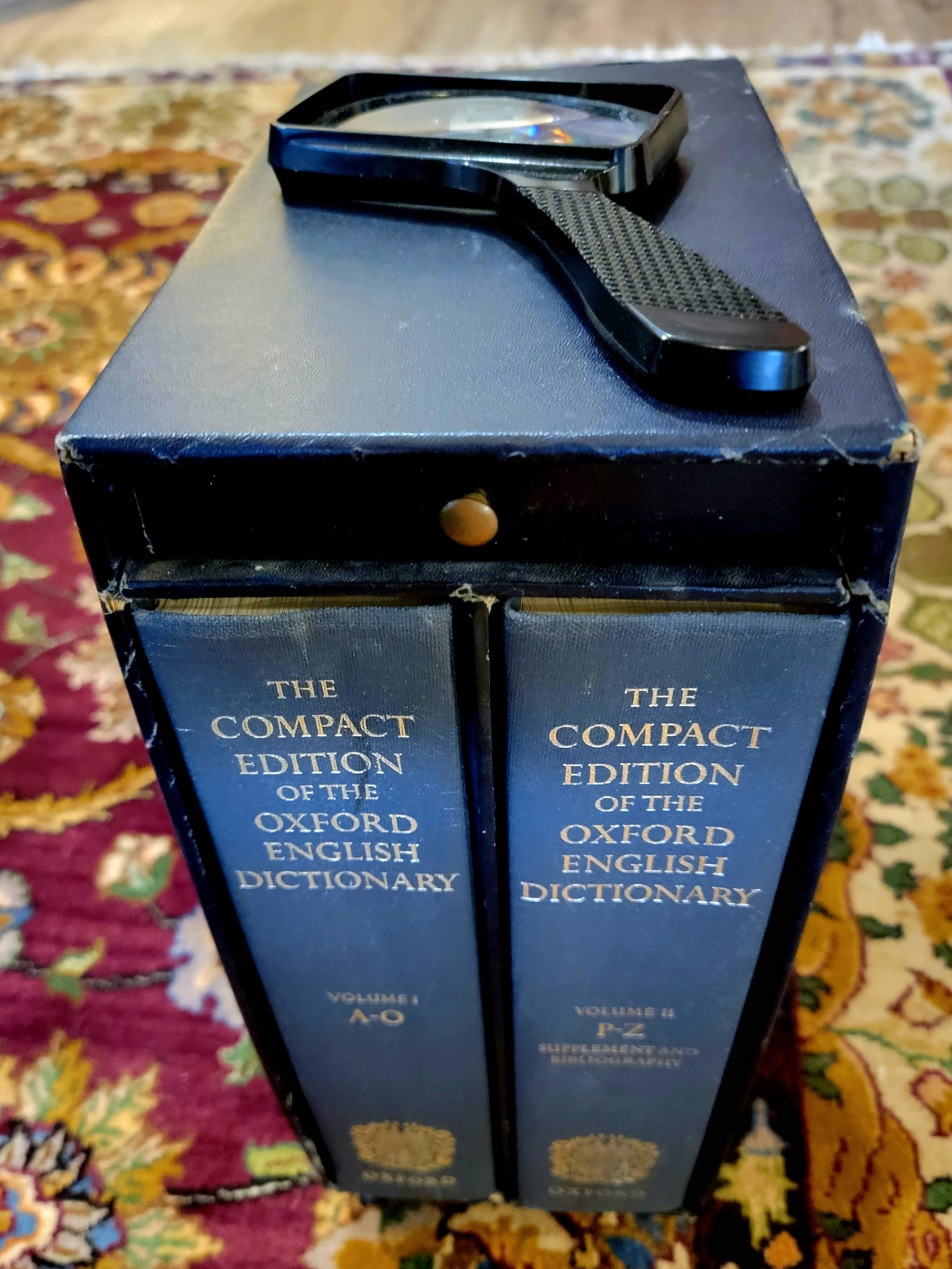
Compact Edition of the Oxford English Dictionary, with included magnifying glass

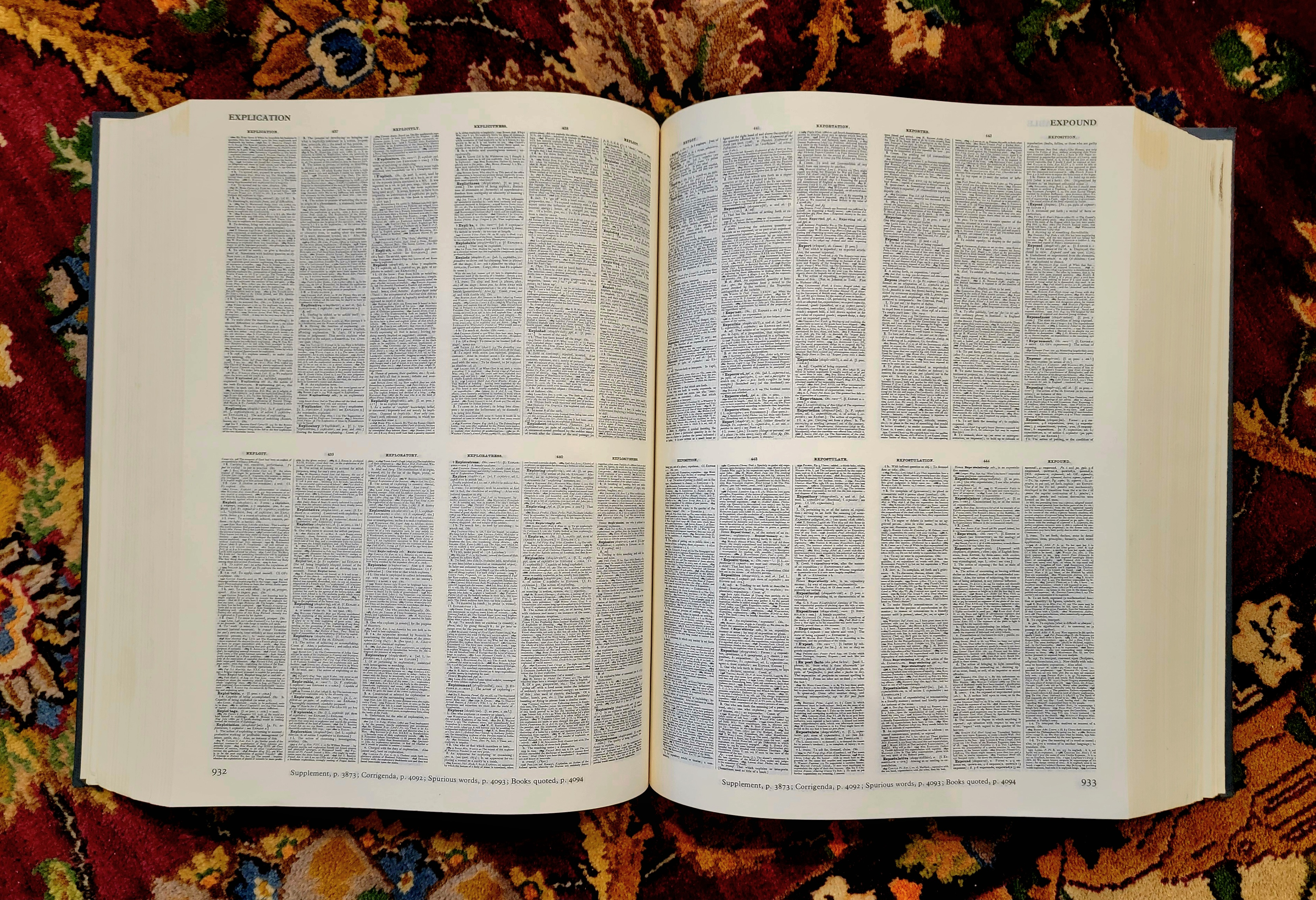
A view of the Compact Edition of the Oxford English Dictionary, showing the four pages per page format

In 1971, the 13-volume OED1 (1933) was reprinted as a two-volume Compact Edition, by photographically reducing each page to one-half its linear dimensions; each compact edition page held four OED1 pages in a four-up ("4-up") format. The two-volume letters were A and P; the first supplement was at the second volume's end. The Compact Edition included, in a small slip-case drawer, a Bausch & Lomb magnifying glass to help in reading reduced type. Many copies were inexpensively distributed through book clubs. In 1987, all four volumes of A Supplement to the Oxford English Dictionary was published as a third volume to the Compact Edition.

The 20-volume OED2 (1989) was republished in 1991 as a compact edition (ISBN 978-0-19-861258-2). The format was re-sized to one-third of original linear dimensions, a nine-up ("9-up") format requiring a stronger magnifying glass (included), but allowing publication of a single-volume dictionary. This version includes definitions of 500,000 words, in 290,000 main entries, with 137,000 pronunciations, 249,300 etymologies, 577,000 cross-references, and 2,412,000 illustrative quotations. It is accompanied by A User's Guide to the "Oxford English Dictionary" by Donna Lee Berg. After this version was published, however, book club offers commonly continued to sell the two-volume 1971 Compact Edition.

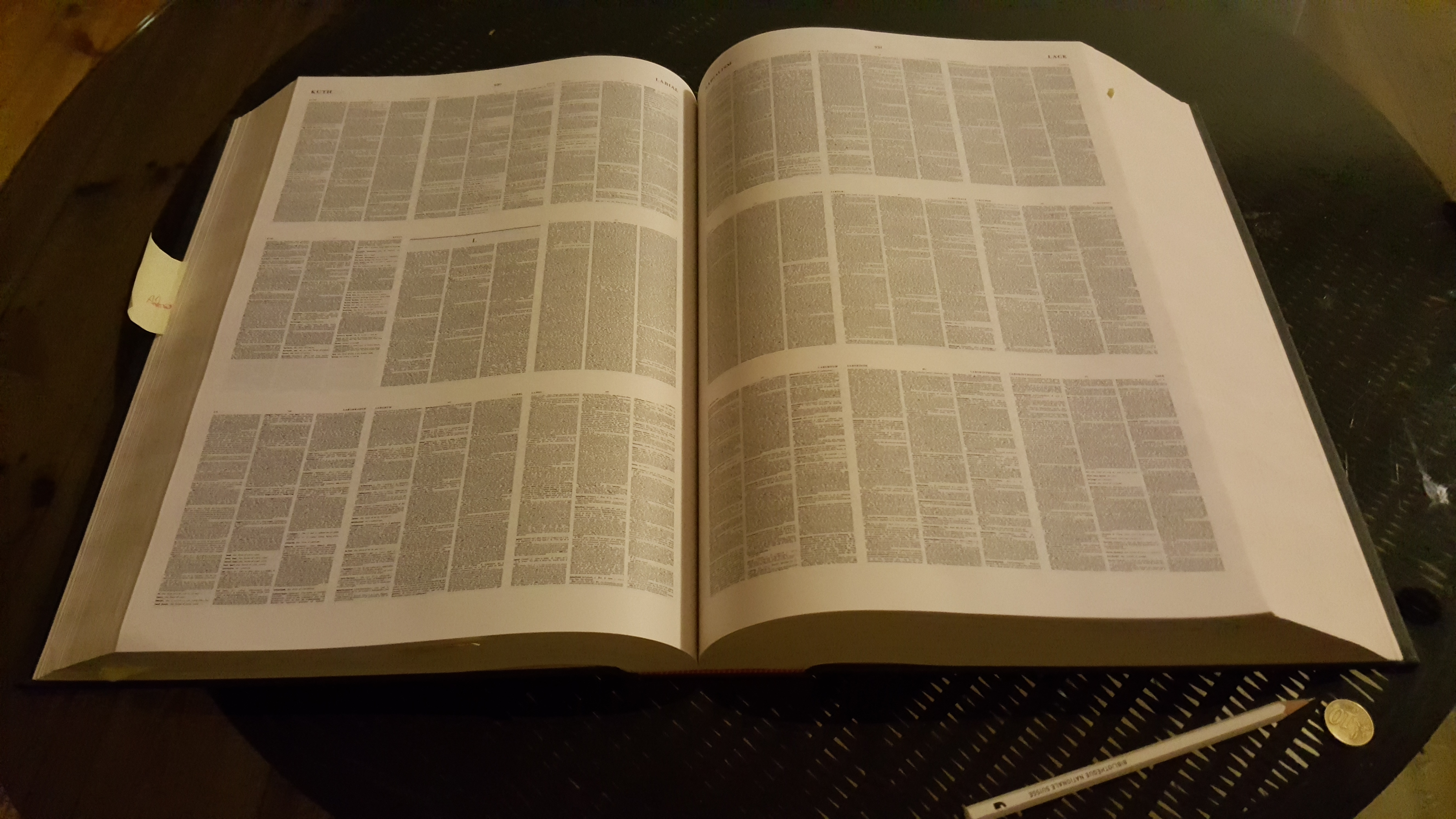
The Compact Oxford English Dictionary (second edition, 1991)

Part of an entry in the 1991 compact edition, with a centimetre scale showing the very small type sizes used

=== Electronic versions ===
A screenshot of the first version of the OED second edition CD-ROM software

OED2 4th Edition CD-ROM

Once the dictionary was digitized and online, it was also available to be published on CD-ROM. The text of the first edition was made available in 1987. Afterward, three versions of the second edition were issued. Version 1 (1992) was identical in content to the printed second edition, and the CD itself was not copy-protected. Version 2 (1999) included the Oxford English Dictionary Additions of 1993 and 1997. These CD-ROM editions are for Microsoft Windows only.

Version 3.0 was released in 2002 with additional words from the OED3 and software improvements. Version 3.1.1 (2007) added support for hard disk installation, so that the user does not have to insert the CD to use the dictionary. It has been reported that this version will work on operating systems other than Windows, using emulation programs. Version 4.0 of the CD was released in June 2009 and has applications for both Windows (7 and later) and MacOS X (10.4 and later). This version uses the CD drive for installation, running only from the hard drive.

On 14 March 2000, the Oxford English Dictionary Online (OED Online) became available to subscribers. The online database containing the OED2 is updated quarterly with revisions that will be included in the OED3 (see § Third edition). The online edition is the most up-to-date version of the dictionary available. The OED website is not optimized for mobile devices, but the developers have stated that there are plans to provide an API to facilitate the development of interfaces for querying the OED.

The price for an individual to use this edition is £100 or US$100 a year; consequently, most subscribers are large organizations such as universities. Some public libraries and companies have also subscribed, including public libraries in the United Kingdom, where access is funded by the Arts Council, and public libraries in New Zealand. Individuals who belong to a library which subscribes to the service are able to use the service from their own homes without charge.

== Relationship to other Oxford dictionaries ==
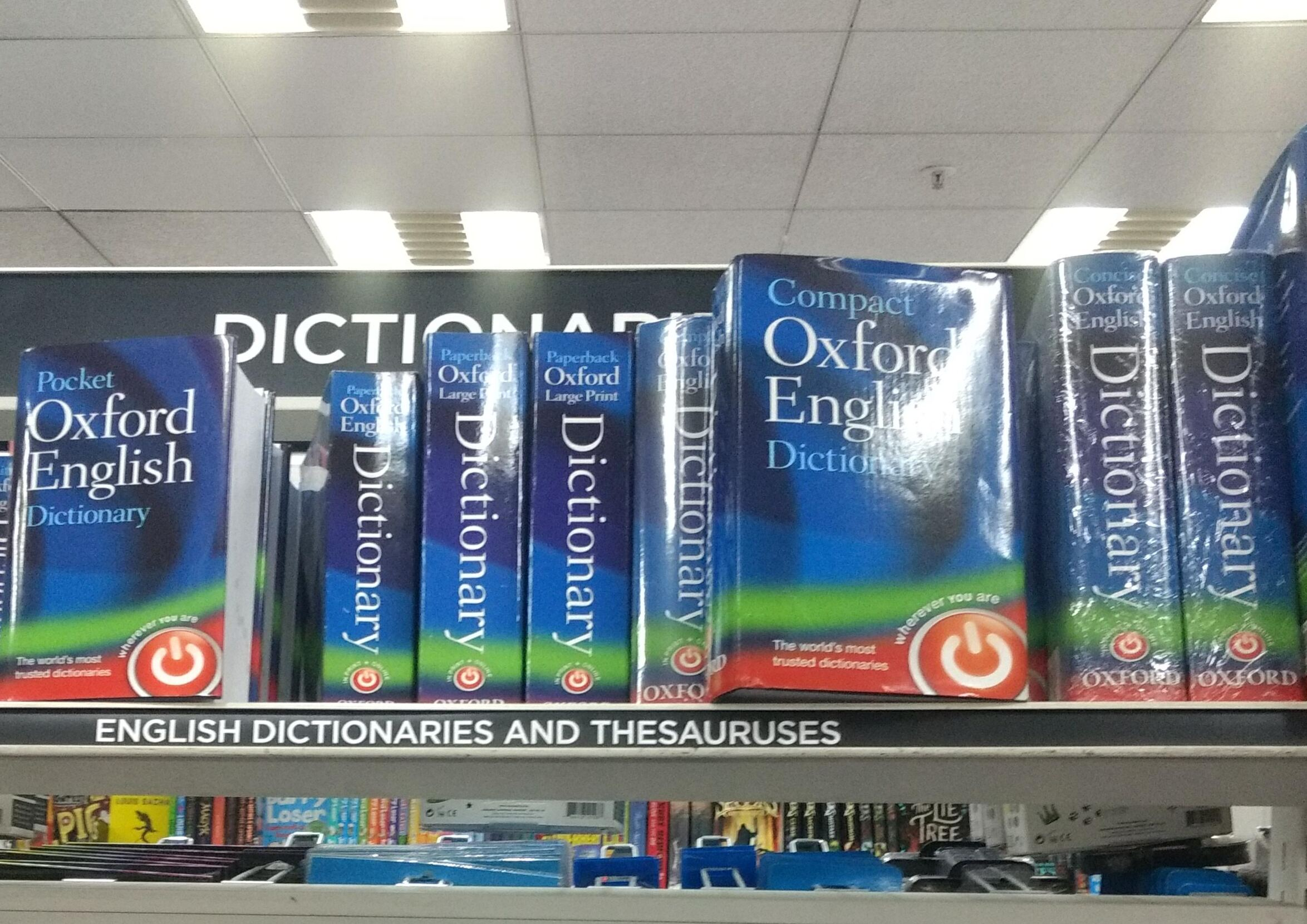
A selection of various Oxford English Dictionaries: pocket, paperback, compact and concise versions

The OED's utility and renown as a historical dictionary have led to numerous offspring projects and other dictionaries bearing the Oxford name, though not all are directly related to the OED itself.

The Shorter Oxford English Dictionary, originally started in 1902 and completed in 1933, is an abridgement of the full work that retains the historical focus, but does not include any words which were obsolete before 1700 except those used by Shakespeare, Milton, Spenser, and the King James Bible. A completely new edition was produced from the OED2 and published in 1993, with revisions in 2002 and 2007.

The Concise Oxford Dictionary is a different work, which aims to cover current English only, without the historical focus. The original edition, mostly based on the OED1, was edited by Francis George Fowler and Henry Watson Fowler and published in 1911, before the main work was completed. Revised editions appeared throughout the twentieth century to keep it up to date with changes in English usage.

The Pocket Oxford Dictionary of Current English was originally conceived by F. G. Fowler and H. W. Fowler to be compressed, compact, and concise. Its primary source is the Oxford English Dictionary, and it is nominally an abridgement of the Concise Oxford Dictionary. It was first published in 1924.

In 1998 the New Oxford Dictionary of English (NODE) was published. While also aiming to cover current English, NODE was not based on the OED. Instead, it was an entirely new dictionary produced with the aid of corpus linguistics. Once NODE was published, a similarly brand-new edition of the Concise Oxford Dictionary followed, this time based on an abridgement of NODE rather than the OED; NODE (under the new title of the Oxford Dictionary of English, or ODE) continues to be principal source for Oxford's product line of current-English dictionaries, including the New Oxford American Dictionary, with the OED now only serving as the basis for scholarly historical dictionaries.

== Spelling ==
The OED lists British headword spellings (e.g., labour, centre) with variants following (labor, center, etc.). For the suffix more commonly spelt -ise in British English, OUP policy dictates a preference for the spelling -ize, e.g., realize vs. realise and globalization vs. globalisation. The rationale is etymological, in that the English suffix is mainly derived from the Greek suffix -ιζειν, (-izein), or the Latin -izāre. However, -ze is also sometimes treated as an Americanism insofar as the -ze suffix has crept into words where it did not originally belong, as with analyse (British English), which is spelt analyze in American English.

== Reception and criticism ==
British prime minister Stanley Baldwin described the OED as a "national treasure". Author Anu Garg, founder of Wordsmith.org, has called it a "lex icon". Tim Bray, co-creator of Extensible Markup Language (XML), credits the OED as the developing inspiration of that markup language.

However, despite its claims of authority, the dictionary has been criticized since the 1960s because of its scope, its claims to authority, its British-centredness and relative neglect of World Englishes, its implied but unacknowledged focus on literary language and, above all, its influence. The OED, as a commercial product, has always had to steer a line between scholarship and marketing. In his review of the 1982 supplement, University of Oxford linguist Roy Harris writes that criticizing the OED is extremely difficult because "one is dealing not just with a dictionary but with a national institution", one that "has become, like the English monarchy, virtually immune from criticism in principle". He further notes that neologisms from respected "literary" authors such as Samuel Beckett and Virginia Woolf are included, whereas those found in newspapers or other less "respectable" sources hold less sway, regardless of their usefulness. He writes that the OED's "[b]lack-and-white lexicography is also black-and-white in that it takes it upon itself to pronounce authoritatively on the rights and wrongs of usage", faulting the dictionary's prescriptive rather than descriptive usage.

To Harris, this prescriptive classification of certain usages as "erroneous" and the complete omission of various forms and usages cumulatively represent the "social bias[es]" of the (presumably well-educated and wealthy) compilers. However, the Guide to the Third Edition of the OED has stated that "Oxford English Dictionary is not an arbiter of proper usage, despite its widespread reputation to the contrary" and that the dictionary "is intended to be descriptive, not prescriptive". The identification of "erroneous and catachrestic" usages is being removed from third edition entries, sometimes in favour of usage notes describing the attitudes to language which have previously led to these classifications. Another avenue of criticism is the dictionary's non-inclusion of etymologies for words of AAVE or African language origin such as jazz, dig or badmouth (the latter two are possibly of Wolof and Mandinka languages, respectively). As of 2022, OUP is preparing a specialized Oxford Dictionary of African American English in collaboration with Harvard University's Hutchins Center for African and African American Research, with literary critic Henry Louis Gates Jr. being the project's editor-in-chief.

Harris also faults the editors' "donnish conservatism" and their adherence to prudish Victorian morals, citing as an example the non-inclusion of "various centuries-old 'four-letter words'" until 1972. However, no English dictionary included such profanity, for fear of possible prosecution under British obscenity laws, until after the conclusion of the Lady Chatterley's Lover obscenity trial in 1960. The Penguin English Dictionary of 1965 was the first dictionary that included the word fuck. Joseph Wright's English Dialect Dictionary had included shit in 1905.

The OED's claims of authority have also been questioned by linguists such as Pius ten Hacken, who notes that the dictionary actively strives toward definitiveness and authority but can only achieve those goals in a limited sense, given the difficulties of defining the scope of what it includes.

Founding editor James Murray was also reluctant to include scientific terms, despite their documentation, unless he felt that they were widely enough used. In 1902, he declined to add the word radium to the dictionary.

== Research using the OED ==
The OED has been used to support research in fields such as linguistics, psycholinguistics, and psychology. Examples include the extension of word meanings via metaphor, the evolution of measurement terms like "foot" from concrete to abstract meanings, and the identification of systematic patterns in word blends (e.g., "brunch" from a blend of "breakfast" and "lunch").

== The OED in popular culture ==
The British quiz show Countdown awarded the leather-bound complete version to the champions of each series between its inception in 1982 and Series 63 in 2010. The prize was axed after Series 83, completed in June 2021, as it was considered out of date.

The 2020 novel The Dictionary of Lost Words by Pip Williams centres on the creation of the OED, the fictional narrator spending much time in the Scriptorium as a child, the daughter of a fictional widowed lexicographer, and later becoming an assistant there. It has been adapted for the stage, and a television series is planned.

The 2019 film The Professor and the Madman featuring Mel Gibson and Sean Penn tells the story of how Professor James Murray begins work compiling words for the first edition of the Oxford English Dictionary in the 19th century, and receives over 10,000 entries from a patient at Broadmoor Criminal Lunatic Asylum, Dr. William Chester Minor.

== See also ==
- Australian Oxford Dictionary
- Canadian Oxford Dictionary
- Compact Oxford English Dictionary of Current English
- Concise Oxford English Dictionary
- New Oxford American Dictionary
- Oxford Advanced Learner's Dictionary
- Shorter Oxford English Dictionary
- A Dictionary of Canadianisms on Historical Principles
- The Australian National Dictionary
- Dictionary of American Regional English

Vol.	Year	Letters	Links
1	1888	A, B	Vol. 1
2	1893	C	Vol. 2
3	1897	D, E	Vol. 3 (version 2)
4	1901	F, G	Vol. 4 (version 2) (version 3)
5	1901	H–K	Vol. 5
6p1	1908	L	Vol. 6, part 1
6p2	1908	M, N	Vol. 6, part 2
7	1909	O, P	Vol.7
8p1	1914	Q, R	Vol. 8, part 1
8p2	1914	S–Sh	Vol.8, part 2
9p1	1919	Si–St	Vol. 9, part 1
9p2	1919	Su–Th	Vol. 9, part 2
10p1	1926	Ti–U	Vol. 10, part 1
10p2	1928	V–Z	Vol. 10, part 2
Sup.	1933	A–Z	Supplement

Vol.	Letters	Links
1	A–B	The Oxford English Dictionary Vol. 1(a-b)
2	C	The Oxford English Dictionary Volume Ii
3	D–E	The Oxford English Dictionary Volume Iii
4	F–G	The Oxford English Dictionary Volume Iv
5	H–K	The Oxford English Dictionary Vol.-v H-k
6	L–M	The Oxford English Dictionary Vol. Vi
7	N–Poy	The Oxford English Dictionary Vol. 7(n-poy)
8	Poy–Ry	The Oxford English Dictionary Vol.-viii Poy-ry
9	S–Soldo	The Oxford English Dictionary Vol. Ix
10	Sole–Sz	The Oxford English Dictionary Vol.-x Sole-sz
11	T–U	The Oxford English Dictionary Vol. Xi
12	V–Z	The Oxford English Dictionary Vol. Xii
Sup.	A–Z	The Oxford English Dictionary Supplement And Bibliography

Volume	Entries
1	A – Bazouki
2	B.B.C. – Chalypsography
3	Cham – Creeky
4	Creel – Duzepere
5	Dvandia – Follis
6	Follow – Haswed
7	Hat – Intervacuum
8	Interval – Looie
9	Look – Mouke
10	Moul – Ovum
11	Ow – Poisant
12	Poise – Quelt
13	Quemadero – Roaver
14	Rob – Sequyle
15	Ser – Soosy
16	Soot – Styx
17	Su – Thrivingly
18	Thro – Unelucidated
19	Unemancipated – Wau-wau
20	Wave – Zyst
