= Australian Oxford Dictionary =

Dictionary of Australian English

The Australian Oxford Dictionary, sometimes abbreviated as AOD, is a dictionary of Australian English published by Oxford University Press.

The AOD combines elements of the previous Oxford publication, The Australian National Dictionary (sometimes abbreviated as AND), which was a comprehensive, historically based record of 10,000 words and phrases representing Australia's contribution to English. However, The Australian National Dictionary was not a full dictionary, and could not be used as one in the normal sense. The AOD borrowed its scholarship both from the AND and from The Oxford English Dictionary, and competed with the Macquarie Dictionary when it was released in 1999.

Like the Macquarie, the AOD combines elements of a normal dictionary with those of an encyclopaedic volume. It is a joint effort of Oxford University and the Australian National University.

The AOD's current editor is Bruce Moore. Its content is largely sourced from the databases of Australian English at the Australian National Dictionary Centre and The Oxford English Dictionary. It also draws on the latest research into International English.

The second edition contains more than 110,000 headwords and more than 10,000 encyclopaedic entries.

In addition to the flagship Australian Oxford Dictionary, shorter versions including the Australian Concise Oxford Dictionary, Australian Paperback Oxford Dictionary, Australian School Oxford Dictionary, Australian Students Oxford Dictionary and Australian School Oxford Dictionary are also published.

== Publications ==
=== Australian Oxford Dictionary ===
- First edition ():
- Second edition (Australian Oxford Dictionary Second Edition) (ISBN 0-19-551796-2/ISBN 978-0-19-551796-5): Includes over 110,000 headwords.

- ?th impression (2004-12-06)

=== Australian Oxford Paperback Dictionary ===
- Second edition (ISBN 0-19-554026-3/ISBN 978-0-19-554026-0):

- ?th impression (1996-12-01)

- Fourth (fifth?) edition (): Includes over 70,000 headwords.

- ISBN 0-19-557863-5/ISBN 978-0-19-557863-8 (includes 12 months free access to the Online Australian Dictionary & Thesaurus)

- ?th impression (2011-11-07)
- ?th impression (2012-04-05)
