= Compact Oxford English Dictionary of Current English =

One-volume dictionary published by Oxford University Press

- Author: Catherine Soanes
- Language: English
- Publisher: Oxford University Press
- Publication place: Oxford

The Compact Oxford English Dictionary of Current English is a one-volume dictionary published by Oxford University Press. It is intended for family or upper secondary school readerships. The third edition (revised), published in 2008, has 1,264 pages, somewhat smaller than the Concise Oxford English Dictionary, and is distinct from the "Compact" (single- and two-volume photo-reduced) editions of the multi-volume Oxford English Dictionary.
