= Shorter Oxford English Dictionary =

Two-volume version of the Oxford English Dictionary

- Leather bound SOED Sixth Edition
- Language: English
- Release number: 6
- Genre: Dictionary
- Published: 21 September 2007
- Publisher: Oxford University Press
- Publication place: United Kingdom
- Pages: 3472
- ISBN: 978-0199233243
- Preceded by: Fifth Edition

The Shorter Oxford English Dictionary (SOED) is an English language dictionary published by the Oxford University Press. The SOED is a two-volume abridgement of the twenty-volume Oxford English Dictionary (OED). It retains the historical dictionary focus of the full OED, but does not include any words which were obsolete before 1700 except those used by Shakespeare, Milton, Spenser, and the King James Bible.

== Print editions ==
=== Development ===
An abridgement of the OED was contemplated from 1879, when the Oxford University Press took over from the Philological Society on what was then known as A New English Dictionary on Historical Principles. However, no action was taken until 1902, when the work was begun by William Little, a fellow of Corpus Christi College, Oxford. He laboured until his death in 1922, at which point he had completed "A" to "T", and "V". The remaining letters were completed by H. W. Fowler ("U", "X", "Y", and "Z") and Jessie Coulson ("W") under the direction of C. T. Onions, who succeeded Little as editor. Onions wrote that SOED was "to present in miniature all the features of the principal work" and to be "a quintessence of those vast materials" in the complete OED. Coulson was not credited for her contribution until the second edition.

=== First edition ===
The first edition was published in February 1933. The authors included Jessie Coulson and she was the first woman to be credited for her work on a version of the OED. It was reprinted in March and April of that year and again in 1934.

=== Second edition ===
The second edition appeared in 1936, contained about 3,000 revisions and additions, and was reprinted in 1939.

=== Third edition ===
The third edition was published in the United States under the name The Oxford Universal Dictionary on Historical Principles in 1944 with reprints in 1947, 1950, 1952, and 1955. The 1955 reprint contained an addendum of new entries. The 1973 reprint contained an enlarged addenda with over seventy pages and a major revision of all the etymologies.

=== Fourth edition ===
The fourth edition was prepared under the supervision of Lesley Brown between 1980 and 1993, and was the first revision of the entire text of the dictionary, a re-abridgement of the OED and its supplements. Published in 1993 as the New Shorter Oxford English Dictionary, the book attempted to include all English words which had substantial currency after 1700, plus the vocabulary of Shakespeare, John Milton, Edmund Spenser and the King James Version of the Bible. As a historical dictionary, it includes obsolete words if they are used by major authors and earlier meanings where they explain the development of a word. Headwords are traced back to their earliest usage. The fourth edition includes 97,600 headwords, 25,250 variant spellings, 500,000 definitions, 87,400 illustrative quotations and 7,333 sources of quotations (including 5,519 individual authors).

=== Fifth edition ===
The fifth edition was published in 2002, and contains more than half a million definitions, with 83,500 illustrative quotations from 7,000 authors. The name Shorter Oxford English Dictionary was used to emphasize the link between this two-volume dictionary and the original twenty-volume OED.

=== Sixth edition ===
On 21 September 2007, the sixth edition appeared. The dictionary now included 600,000 words, phrases, and definitions, covering global English-speaking regions and 2500 new words and meanings from Oxford Dictionaries and Oxford English Corpus. As previously, the vocabulary included entries in general English from 1700 to the present day and in earlier major literary works. The dictionary included 80,000 quotations illustrating the use of words, thousands of newly discovered antedatings based on the continuing research for the OED, 2,500 new words and senses, thousands of antedatings of existing words from Oxford English Dictionary and Oxford English Corpus, many new quotations from then-recent authors, and a complete review of spelling forms and defining vocabulary.

16,000 words lost their hyphen. Angus Stevenson, the editor of the Shorter OED, stated the reason: "People are not confident about using hyphens anymore, they're not really sure what they are for." Its researchers reviewed a corpus of 2 billion words (in newspapers, books, web sites and blogs from 2000). Bumble-bee is now bumblebee, ice-cream is ice cream and pot-belly is pot belly.

== Electronic versions ==
The Shorter Oxford English Dictionary is available on CD-ROM for Windows and Macintosh. Version 3.0 of that CD-ROM is copy-protected using SecuROM.

The dictionary is also available as an electronic download plug-in for WordWeb for Windows and for Mac OS X.

In addition to all of the contents of the traditional paper dictionary, the electronic versions include:

- Audio pronunciations
- Automatic look-up of words from other applications
- Search functions
- Crossword solver and anagram functions
