= Gowers =

Gowers is a surname of Welsh origin. Notable people with the name include:

- Andrew Gowers (born 1957), financial journalist and media strategist
  - Gowers Review of Intellectual Property, 2006
- Andrew Gowers (footballer) (born 1969), Australian rules footballer
- Ashley Gowers (born 1994), English cricketer
- Billy Gowers (born 1996), Australian rules footballer
- Bruce Gowers (1940–2023), British television director and producer
- Emily Gowers (born 1963), British classical scholar
- Ernest Gowers (1880–1966), author of writing style guides
- Gillian Gowers (born 1964), English badminton player
- Ken Gowers (1936–2017), English rugby league player
- Patrick Gowers (1936–2014), English music composer
- Peter Gowers (born 1972), British businessman
- Timothy Gowers, FRS (born 1963), British mathematician
  - Gowers norm, in additive combinatorics
- Trevor Gowers (1945–1996), Australian rules footballer
- Walter Gowers (1903–1965), English footballer and rugby league player
- William Frederick Gowers (1875–1954), British colonial administrator
- William Richard Gowers (1845–1915), British neurologist
  - Gowers' sign, indicating weakness of the proximal muscles

== See also ==
- Gower
  - Gower (surname)
- Old Gowers, former pupils of University College School
