= Eirwen =

Welsh female given name

- Pronunciation: Welsh: [ˈeirwɛn] /ˈaɪrwɛn/ IRE-wen
- Gender: Female

Origin
- Origin: Welsh
- Meaning: White/Blessed Snow

Other names
- Related names: Eirwyn, Eurwen, Eurwyn

Eirwen is a feminine given name.

== Origin and meaning ==
Eirwen is a Welsh feminine given name meaning "white/blessed snow" and derives from the Welsh words "Eira" (snow) and "Gwyn" (white, fair or blessed).

== Notable people ==
- Eirwen Davies, (1926–2014), Welsh broadcaster and BBC news presenter
- Eirwen Meiriona St John Williams Gwynn (1916–2007), Welsh nationalist, writer, teacher and physicist

== Eurwen ==
A variant is Eurwen (Welsh: [ˈɛiruːɛn]; /ˈɛərwɛn/ AYR-wen) meaning "white/blessed gold" deriving from the Welsh words "Aur" (gold) and "Gwyn" (white, fair, blessed).

Notable people with this name include:

- Kate Eurwen O'Toole (b. 1960), British actress (daughter of Peter O'Toole and Siân Phillips),

== See also ==
- Eirwyn (masculine form)
- Euryn
- Euryn (given name)
