= Gower =

Gower may refer to:

== People ==
- Gower (surname), including a list of people with the name
- Baron Gower and Earl Gower, subsidiary titles of the Duke of Sutherland
- Gower Champion (1919–1980), American actor, theatre director and dancer

== Places ==
=== United Kingdom ===
- Gower Peninsula, in South Wales
  - Lordship of Gower, an ancient district, the original meaning of the name Gower
  - Gower (UK Parliament constituency)
  - Gower (Senedd constituency), a former Senedd constituency
  - Gower (electoral ward), an electoral ward of Swansea, Wales
  - Gŵyr Abertawe, a current Senedd constituency (as of 2026)
- Gower (Llanrwst electoral ward), in Conwy, North Wales
- Gower Street (London)

=== United States ===
- Gower Township, Cedar County, Iowa
- Gower, Missouri
- Gower Gulch (Death Valley), California
- Gower Street (Los Angeles), California
- Gower's Island, Tennessee

=== Australia ===
- Gower, Victoria

== Other uses ==
- Gower (magazine), journal of the Gower Society
- Gower Publishing, an imprint of Ashgate Publishing
- Gower, a fictional character in Shakespeare's Henry V

== See also ==
- Gowers, a surname
- Old Gowers, former pupils of University College School, London
