= Eirwyn =

Welsh male given name

- Pronunciation: Welsh: [ˈe(i)ruːɪn] /ˈaɪrwɪn/ IRE-win
- Gender: Male

Origin
- Origin: Welsh
- Meaning: White/Blessed Snow

Other names
- Related names: Eirwen, Eurwyn, Eurwen

Eirwyn is a masculine given name.

== Origin and meaning ==
Eirwyn is a Welsh masculine given name meaning "white/blessed snow" and derives from the Welsh words "Eira" (snow) and "Gwyn" (white, fair or blessed).

== Notable people ==
- Eirwyn George (1936–2026), Welsh poet, writer and author
- Gwilym Eirwyn Jones (1922–1994), Welsh carpenter, entertainer and nationalist (known as Eirwyn Pontshân or Pontsian)
- David Eirwyn Morgan (1918–1982), Welsh minister, journalist and nationalist politician
- John "Shôn" Eirwyn Ffowcs Williams (1935–2020), Welsh Professor of Engineering and Master of Emmanuel College, Cambridge

== Eurwyn ==
A variant is Eurwyn (Welsh: [ˈɛiruːɪn]; /ˈɛərwɪn/ AYR-win) meaning "white/blessed gold" deriving from the Welsh words "Aur" (gold) and "Gwyn" (white, fair, blessed).

Notable people with this name include:

- Eurwyn Wiliam, Welsh curator and author

== See also ==
- Eirwen (feminine form)
- Euryn
- Euryn (given name)
