= Gowers Report =

Gowers Report may refer to:

- A number of reports by Ernest Gowers (1880–1966)
- Gowers Review of Intellectual Property, by Andrew Gowers, 2006

== See also ==
- Gowers, a surname
