= Royal Commission on Capital Punishment =

Royal Commission on Capital Punishment may refer to:

- Royal Commission on Capital Punishment 1864–66
- Royal Commission on Capital Punishment 1949–1953
