= Vallins =

Vallins is a surname. Notable people with the surname include:

- George Henry Vallins (1897–1956), English schoolmaster
- John Vallins (born 1950), Australian songwriter
