= Pont Aberarth =

Grade II listed bridge in Wales

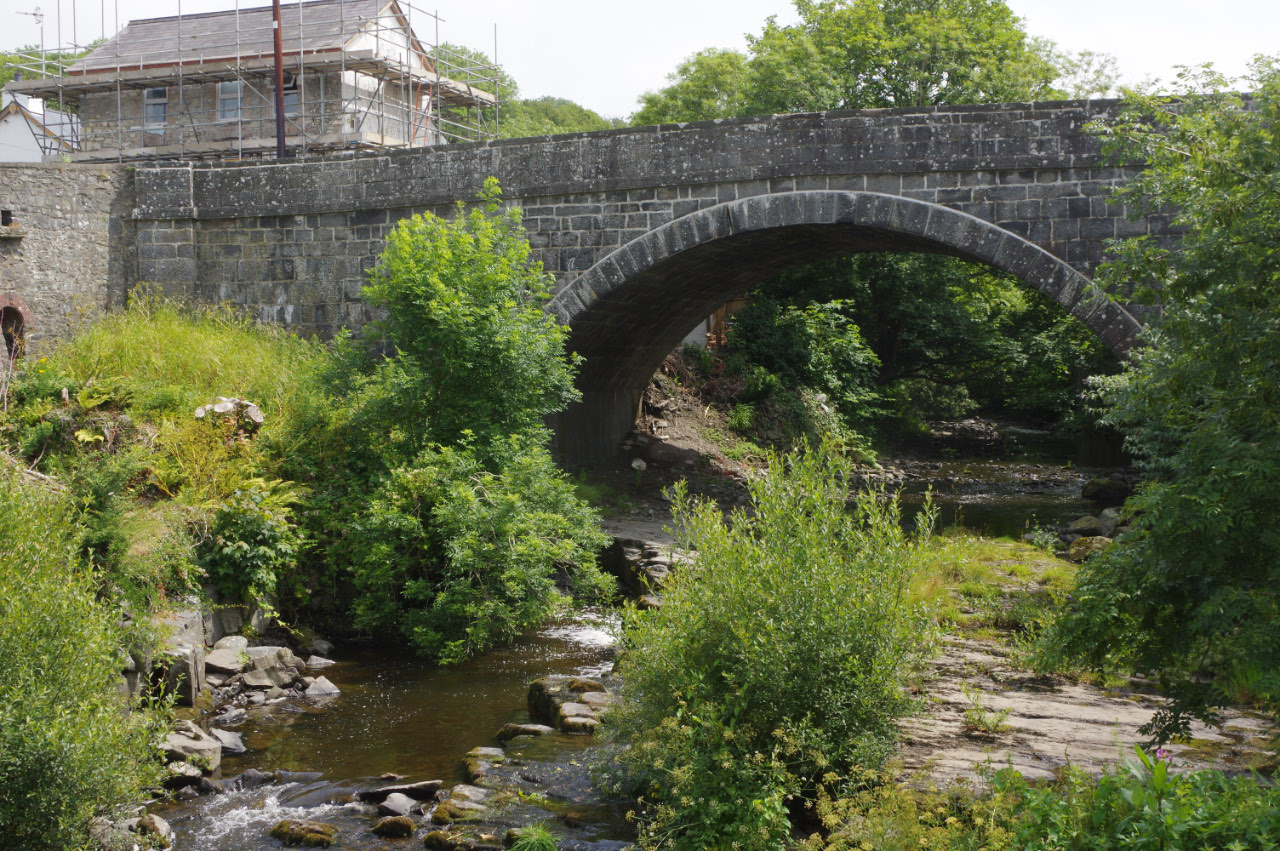
- Pont Aberarth
- Coordinates: 52°15′04″N 4°13′44″W
- Carries: A487 road
- Crosses: River Arth
- Locale: Aberarth, Wales
- Heritage status: Grade II Listed

Characteristics
- Design: Arch bridge

History
- Designer: Thomas Penson or Richard Penson
- Construction end: 1849

Location
- Interactive map of Pont Aberarth

Pont Aberarth, also known as the Llanddewi-Aberarth Bridge, is a single-arched grade II listed bridge, which spans the River Arth in the village of Aberarth, Ceredigion, Wales. It was completed in 1849, and carries the A487 trunk road between Cardigan and Aberystwyth.

== History ==
An earlier bridge at Aberarth was destroyed by floods in 1846. Calls for tenders to rebuild the bridge were made early in 1847. Along with plans, costs and sureties, the successful tender would have to include maintaining the bridge for seven years.

== Construction ==
The new bridge was completed in 1849 by Thomas Penson of Oswestry or his son Richard Penson. The bridge carries the A487 road, also known as the Fishguard to Bangor Trunk Road in West and North Wales. A short section with an arch for leat overflow carries the date 1912. The bridge was listed Grade II on 23 May 1996, and it is described as "Pont Aberarth and attached abutment walls".

== See also ==
- List of bridges in Wales
