= Llewelyn Wyn Griffith =

Welsh novelist

Llewelyn Wyn Griffith CBE
- Born: 30 August 1890; Llandrillo yn Rhos, Denbighshire, Wales
- Died: 27 September 1977 (aged 87)
- Occupation: Novelist
- Notable work: Up to Mametz

Llewelyn Wyn Griffith CBE (30 August 1890 – 27 September 1977) was a Welsh novelist, born in Llandrillo yn Rhos, Denbighshire. He is known for his memoir, Up to Mametz, based on his service during World War I.

Educated at Dolgellau Grammar School, he joined the civil service. On the outbreak of war in August 1914 he was working at the Inland Revenue in London. He tried to join up but was refused because the Inland Revenue was considered a reserved occupation. When the rules were relaxed he and a friend tried to join the Royal Naval Division, but his friend was rejected. Both then joined the 7th (Merionethshire and Montgomeryshire) Battalion, Royal Welch Fusiliers of the Territorial Force. When the 15th (Service) Battalion, Royal Welsh Fusiliers (1st London Welsh) was forming as part of 'Kitchener's Army' Griffith applied for a commission and was accepted in January 1915. His service as a company commander with the 15th Royal Welsh Fusiliers, part of the 38th (Welsh) Division, provided the material for Up to Mametz. He covered his later war service on the staff in the sequel Beyond Mametz (unpublished until 2010).

Griffith was a career civil servant, and rose to a senior post in the Inland Revenue. He was a key helper to Sir Ernest Gowers in the writing of Plain Words in 1948. He was a well-known broadcaster, a founder-member of the Round Britain Quiz team. After retirement from the Inland Revenue he served as vice chairman of the Arts Council of Great Britain. He was appointed CBE in the 1961 Birthday Honours.

A continuation of his World War memoir, based on research into Griffith's papers, was published in 2010.

== Works ==
=== Works by Griffith ===
- Up to Mametz (1930)
- Spring of Youth (1935)
- The Wooden Spoon (1937)
- The Way Lies West (1945)
- The Barren Tree (1945)
- The Welsh (1950)
- The Adventures of Pryderi (1962)

=== Related works ===
- Up to Mametz and Beyond (2010)
