= A Manual of Diseases of the Nervous System =

1886 textbook by William Gowers

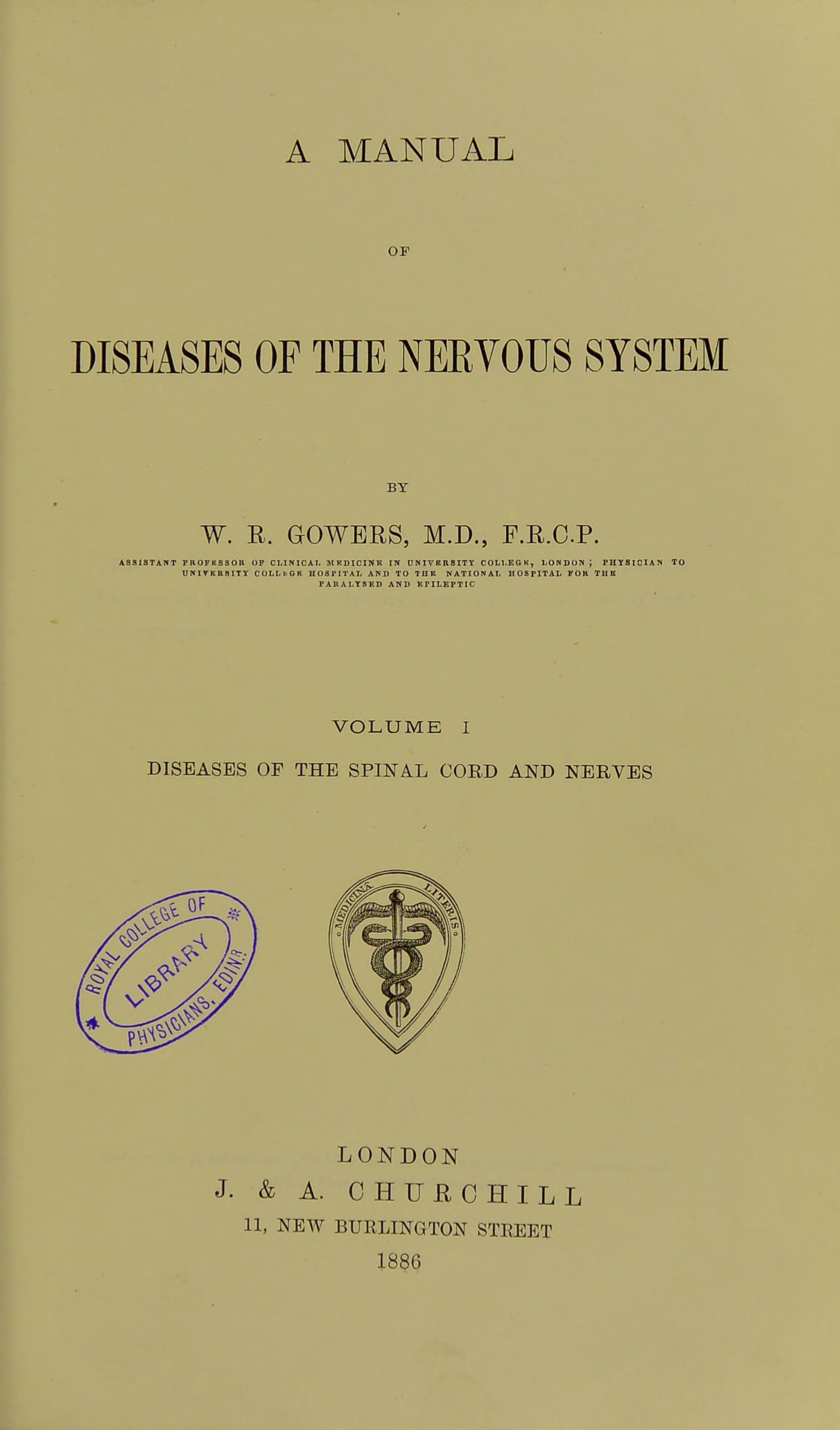
- A Manual of Diseases of the Nervous System. Volume I title page, 1886.
- Author: W.R. Gowers
- Original title: A Manual of Diseases of the Nervous System. Volume I: Diseases Of The Spinal Cord And Nerves
- Language: English
- Published: 1886
- Publisher: P. Blackiston & Son
- Publication place: United Kingdom

A Manual of Diseases of the Nervous System, also known as the ‘Bible of Neurology’, is a medical textbook by William Gowers. It was first published in 1886 by P. Blackiston & Son. A second volume appeared in 1888.
