= Harlequin Puppet Theatre =

Puppet theatre in Rhos-on-Sea, Wales

Coordinates: 53°18′24″N 3°44′23″W

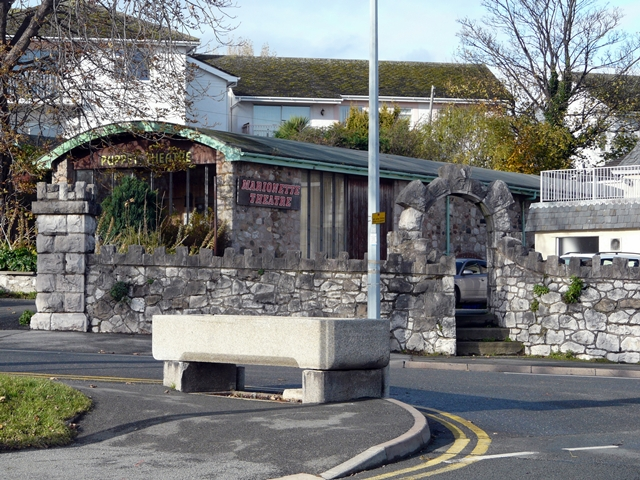
- Interactive map of Harlequin Puppet Theatre
- Address: Promenade; Rhos on Sea; Wales
- Operator: Chris Somerville
- Capacity: 100
- Type: Puppet theatre

Construction
- Opened: 1958
- Architect: Eric Bramall

The Harlequin Puppet Theatre (founded 1958) is a puppet theatre at Rhos-on-Sea, Wales. Britain's oldest permanent puppet theatre, the Harlequin was built in 1958 by Eric Bramall and was later run by his former puppeteer partner, Chris Somerville, who died in 2023. The small, 100-seat theatre is home to a collection of approximately 1,000 marionettes that featured in puppet shows during Britain's school holiday seasons.

== History ==
Theatre founder Eric Bramall (born in Wallasey, Merseyside, England) began putting on touring puppet shows in 1946, with the help of his mother. From 1951 to 1956, Bramall performed increasingly elaborate puppet shows each summer in a temporary theatre built onto an existing bandstand in Colwyn Bay, North Wales. After Colwyn Bay Council said he could no longer use the bandstand, a fellow puppet enthusiast named Millicent Ford who lived on the seafront at Rhos-on-Sea offered him a portion of her land on which to build a permanent puppet theatre. Architects drew up plans based on Eric Bramall's detailed ideas. The Harlequin was built in eleven weeks, using wood, glass, and local stone salvaged from derelict servants' quarters which had occupied the site. Bramall painted the murals on the auditorium walls in a single week. The Opening Ceremony was performed by Sir Clayton Russon on 7 July 1958. The resulting building won a Civic Trust Award for its design. Its construction marked the first time in British history that a permanent theatre had been specifically designed and built for puppet playing.

Since 1958 Bramall's marionette skills had been regularly featured on a children's television show; he and co-puppeteer Chris Somerville were subsequently given a weekly 15-minute puppet programme on BBC Wales, which continued until 1984. This and other outside work helped enable the Harlequin Puppet Theatre to stay in business, despite declining attendance over the decades. Eric Bramall died in July 1996. As of 2012 his theatre continued to operate under Chris Somerville's stewardship until his death early in 2023. The theatre was subsequently granted Grade II listed building status to secure its future .

In an interview for The Telegraph, Somerville commented on the increasingly endangered status of marionette artistry:

I worry that the marionette is not the puppet of choice any more – you see a lot of hand puppets in the West End shows but marionettes take time to learn the craft. Why would people spend the time training when there are no jobs and no money? I don't earn enough to pay tax and I only go home to sleep, I work the rest of the time. But I'm one of the lucky ones; if you've got some way of being creative then it's the most satisfying thing in life. I get the same thrill out of this as I got when I was a kid playing with toys.
