= The Complete Plain Words =

1954 book by Ernest Gowers

Click to access a PDF of the original 1954 edition

The Complete Plain Words, titled simply Plain Words in its 2014 revision, is a style guide written by Sir Ernest Gowers, published in 1954. It has never been out of print. It comprises expanded and revised versions of two pamphlets that he wrote at the request of HM Treasury, Plain Words (1948) and ABC of Plain Words (1951). The aim of the book is to help officials in their use of English as a tool of their trade. To keep the work relevant for readers in subsequent decades it has been revised by Sir Bruce Fraser in 1973, by Sidney Greenbaum and Janet Whitcut in 1986, and by the original author's great-granddaughter Rebecca Gowers in 2014.

All the editions until that of 2014 were published by Her Majesty's Stationery Office (HMSO). The most recent is issued by an imprint of Penguin Books.

== Background ==
The association of wordiness with bureaucracy has a long history. In the 14th century Geoffrey Chaucer, a prominent civil servant as well as a poet, urged the use of straightforward writing. (Note: In The House of Fame (c. 1380) Chaucer wrote: Have I not preved thus simply, Withouten any subtiltee Of speche, or gret prolixitee Of termes of philosophye, Of figures of poetrye, Or colours of rethoryke? Pardee, hit oghte thee to lyke; For hard langage and hard matere Is encombrous for to here At ones) Reviewing Plain Words in 1948, The Manchester Guardian quoted the French revolutionary Martial Herman writing in 1794:

The nonsensical jargon of the old Ministries must be replaced by a simple style, clear and yet concise, free from expressions of servility, from obsequious formulae, stand-offishness, pedantry, or any suggestion that there is an authority superior to that of reason, or of the order established by law. There must be no conventional phrases, no waste of words.

The British civil service of the 19th and early 20th centuries had a reputation for pomposity and long-windedness in its written communications. In Little Dorrit in the mid-1850s, Charles Dickens caricatured officialdom as the "Circumlocution Office", where for even the most urgent matter nothing could be done without "half a score of boards, half a bushel of minutes, several sacks of official memoranda, and a family-vault full of ungrammatical correspondence." By the 1880s the term "officialese" was in use, defined by the Oxford English Dictionary as, "The formal and typically verbose language considered characteristic of officials or official documents".

Ernest Gowers in 1920

Sir Ernest Gowers, a senior civil servant, was among those who wished to see officialese replaced by normal English. In 1929 he remarked in a speech about the civil service, "It is said ... that we revel in jargon and obscurity". During the Second World War, with the role of government greatly expanded, official communications proliferated, and in Gowers's (Note: Gowers was not dogmatic about the possessive form of names such as his that end in "s", but he described the form "Jones's room" as "the most favoured practice" as opposed to "Jones' room". In her biography of Gowers, his granddaughter Ann Scott uses the form "Gowers' room"; in the extensive biographical sketch that prefaces the 2014 edition of Plain Words, his great-granddaughter Rebecca Gowers uses "Gowers's room". After the 1973 revised edition came out, Bruce Fraser was criticised for referring to "Gowers' work", rather than "Gowers's work". To an amateur grammarian who objected, he replied, "No one can deny that what you say is entirely logical and sensible", but he retained the shorter form in reprints of the edition, and it was preserved in the Greenbaum and Whitcut edition of 1986.) view were full of "mistiness and grandiloquence". He called for a new style of official writing, friendly in tone and easy to understand. His views came to the notice of the head of the civil service, Sir Edward Bridges, permanent secretary to the Treasury. After Gowers retired from the civil service at the end of the war, (Note: Gowers's public service career continued as chairman of several royal commissions and other bodies until 1953, and on the board of the National Hospitals for Nervous Diseases until 1957.) Bridges asked him to write a short pamphlet on good writing, for the benefit of the new generation of officials. Bridges called on his senior colleagues throughout the civil service to cooperate; some had already made efforts in the same cause, including the Inland Revenue, whose advice to staff included "one golden rule to bear in mind always: that we should try to put ourselves in the position of our correspondent, to imagine his feelings as he writes his letters, and to gauge his reaction as he receives ours." (Note: This use of "he" to indicate readers of both sexes was customary at the time, and was used in the original Plain Words and its successors until the 1986 revision. Twenty-five years after the first Plain Words, David Hunt, reviewing the 1973 edition, wrote, "No writer of English at any level, from the most elaborate to the most utilitarian, can fail to derive profit from this book. He could [profit] for example, by studying Sir Bruce's instructions on how to arrange his thoughts before starting to write.")

Government departments sent Gowers many examples of officialese so extreme as to be amusing; a small committee of senior officials formed to help him and comment on his proposals. The colleague on whom Gowers most relied was Llewelyn Wyn Griffith of the Inland Revenue, whose contribution Gowers acknowledged in the prefaces to Plain Words and its two successors.

== Plain Words, 1948 ==
The result of Gowers's work was Plain Words, a 94-page booklet. It was judged successful by the civil service, and the Treasury considered that it should be made publicly available. Had Gowers written it as part of his duties while still a civil servant it would have automatically been Crown copyright, but as he had not begun it until after his retirement he owned the rights. The Treasury offered a flat fee of £500, but he successfully held out for a royalty on every copy sold. The government publisher, His Majesty's Stationery Office (HMSO), issued the booklet for sale in April 1948. It was priced at two shillings (10 pence in British decimal currency); between April and Christmas 1948 it sold more than 150,000 copies and had to be reprinted seven times.

Reviewers responded favourably. The Times Literary Supplement praised the book and engaged in a little mock-officialese of its own: "It deserves to be a 'best seller' (or perhaps we should say that in all the circumstances it may reasonably be anticipated that it will be found to evoke a relatively considerable demand on the part of the general public)." The Times devoted a leader to the work, and concluded, "for all its cool urbanity Plain Words is written with missionary zeal". The Manchester Guardian considered that by commissioning Plain Words from Gowers "the Treasury has put us all in its debt." The Economist commented, "The Stationery Office must have enjoyed publishing this book. It is great fun to read".

Occasionally Gowers's humour misled literal-minded reviewers. The Daily Mail, Harold Nicolson and the grammarian G H Vallins objected to the conspicuously un-plain words of Gowers's opening sentences:

The purpose of this book is to help officials in their use of written English. To some of them this may seem a work of supererogation, calculated only to place an unnecessary burden on a body of people already overburdened.

When revising the text in preparation for The Complete Plain Words, Gowers abandoned the joke, (Note: If indeed it was a joke: the text was read by Gowers's advisory colleagues, all keen on plain English, but Rebecca Gowers suggests that the use of the phrase was an oversight.) and rewrote the second sentence as, "I suspect that this project may be received by many of them without any marked enthusiasm or gratitude." A substantive objection by Vallins to "the cult of 'plain English'" was his view that verbose phrases lose important nuances when reduced to plain words. He gave as an example "evacuated to alternative accommodation", which in his opinion has overtones that Gowers's "taken to other houses" lacks.

== ABC of Plain Words, 1951 ==
Click to access a PDF

The Treasury invited Gowers to build on the success of Plain Words by producing a second volume of advice on good, clear writing. As with its predecessor, he "had many helpers to thank", including Griffith and other civil service colleagues. He also drew on the works of well-known writers on English usage, including H W Fowler, A P Herbert and Eric Partridge. The ABC of Plain Words had 160 pages, and was priced at three shillings (15p).

Gowers explained the purpose of the new book in his preface, "We must have something that can be kept on the desk and consulted on points of difficulty as they arise. Plain Words is of little use for that: it has not even an index". The new work consisted of articles, mostly brief, on points of vocabulary, grammar, construction, punctuation and style, set out in alphabetical order, beginning with "Abstract words" and ending with "Write". The former was one of the longer entries, explaining the dangers of overuse of abstract words, and recommending concrete terms where possible. Thus, "Was this the realisation of an anticipated liability?" would be better as, "Did you expect to have to do this?" The entry on "Write" was an example of one of the short articles on particular words; it pointed out that "I wrote to you about it" needs the "to" but "I wrote you a letter" does not.

Gowers and his successors revised their advice as usage changed over the years. Two consecutive entries in The ABC illustrate how some comments have become dated and others have not: Gowers warned in 1951 that the word "backlog" meaning "arrears" would be unintelligible to British readers, and in the next entry he advised that the construction "on a ... basis" should be avoided. The latter remains a frequent feature of loose writing and all the editions of the Plain Words books retain and expand Gowers's advice, whereas within three years of writing The ABC, Gowers noted in The Complete Plain Words that "backlog" was rapidly and usefully establishing itself in British usage.

Neither the Treasury nor HMSO expected the second book to rival the popularity of its predecessor, but it sold nearly 80,000 copies in its first year. Gowers was nevertheless not wholly happy with it. He thought the A–Z layout had two disadvantages. The first was that it gave the wrong impression that all the topics were of equal importance; the second was that the people most in need of advice would not think to look up the relevant entry: "There is no reason why anyone addicted to abstract nouns, unconscious of any offence, should ever be prompted to read that article; nor can I think of any other title for it that would be more likely to throw it in his way."

== The Complete Plain Words, 1954 ==
By 1954 both books were still selling well. Almost 300,000 copies of Plain Words and more than 130,000 of The ABC had been sold. The Treasury, HMSO and Gowers agreed that the obvious and best course would be to combine the two booklets into a single volume. This Gowers did, with help from his colleagues, as before; he made many revisions as a result of "the many correspondents from all parts of the English-speaking world who have been good enough … to send me suggestions, criticisms and specimens". An example of his revisions is in the entry on "bottleneck", of which in 1951 he had written four brief sentences warning against overuse: in 1954 he felt it necessary to write 270 words, so ubiquitous had the term become. (Note: Among the more extreme uses of the word noted by Gowers in 1954 were "drastic bottleneck", the "vicious circle of interdependent bottlenecks" and the "worldwide bottleneck". In the 2014 edition Rebecca Gowers points out that misuse of the word has not completely vanished, citing a recent use of "the single biggest bottleneck in the economy".) (By the time of the 1973 revision the fad for the word had declined, and Fraser's entry is very much shorter.)

The Complete Plain Words contained 226 pages, including seven pages of index. It was a hardback, in green cloth binding with dust-jacket, in HMSO's preferred size, used for the two earlier Plain Words books, 8.4in x 5.25in (21.3 cm x 13.3 cm). It was published in September 1954 at what The Manchester Guardian called the remarkably cheap price of five shillings (25p). (Note: Using the Retail Price Index, five shillings in 1954 equates to £5.62 in 2011 terms. The 2014 edition of Plain Words was published at £14.99.) The Times Literary Supplement greeted the publication: "It may be hoped that in this more durable form the book's good influence will continue to spread: Civil Servants have not been alone in profiting from it in the past, nor should they be in the future." The book has remained in print, in its original and revised editions, ever since.

Between Gowers's prologue and epilogue there is a Digression on Legal English followed by chapters on The Elements, Correctness, Avoiding the Superfluous Word, Choosing the Familiar Word, Choosing the Precise Word, The Handling of Words, and Punctuation.

== 1973 revision by Bruce Fraser ==
Click to access a PDF

The 1954 text was reprinted seven times during Gowers's lifetime, and he made a number of amendments in the various impressions. Changing times in the 1960s meant that a substantial revision was needed if the book was to continue to fulfil its purpose. Gowers, fully occupied for a decade in making the first revision of Fowler's Modern English Usage, was unable to carry out the task; he died in 1966, a few months after the publication of the revised Fowler. Another retired senior civil servant, Bruce Fraser, was asked to revise The Complete Plain Words. The new edition, 250 pages long, was published by HMSO at £1, in hardback with black cloth binding and dust-jacket, in the same format as the first edition.

Fraser preserved Gowers's structure, and added three new chapters, the most important of which was titled "Some recent trends"; it covered the increasing prevalence of informality, and the influences of America, science, technology, economics, business, and personnel management. The final sections of the chapter were on "vogue words" and "modish writing". Fraser noted that though Gowers had said approvingly in 1954 that the use of the subjunctive was dying out, it was now, under the influence of American writing, making an unwelcome reappearance in English usage.

Reviewing the new edition in The Times Literary Supplement, David Hunt commented of Fraser, "his wit, perhaps a little drier and more Scottish, is equally acute, diverting and instructive". In The Times, Dennis Potter said that the book remained "the happiest thing to come out of the Treasury". He praised Fraser for replacing Gowers's dated examples of officialese with modern specimens and updating the text to reflect current trends, but concluded:

The core of the book remains Gowers, but I do not think Fraser, for all his desire to be faithful, has been able to keep the urbane, untroubled, effortless grace which made the original so instantly attractive. And, to be fair, the times have made this all but impossible. ... The Complete Plain Words in any new version cannot possibly have the same impact as Gowers first had when he reminded administrators that they could best express themselves in a clean and economical prose. But this version, which battles with later jargon and more subtle temptations, a version less sure of the nature of its readership or the mood of the nation, is an honourable and certainly a useful guide.

The Fraser edition was reprinted in hardback three times between 1973 and 1983. Penguin published a paperback version in the UK in 1973, and in the US in 1975.

== 1986 revision by Sidney Greenbaum and Janet Whitcut ==
The third edition was commissioned not by the Treasury but by Her Majesty's Stationery Office, to mark its bicentenary. The revision was made not by an experienced public servant but by an academic and a lexicographer, Sidney Greenbaum, Quain Professor of English Language and Literature at University College London and Janet Whitcut, formerly senior research editor of the Longman Dictionary. They chose to revise Fraser's 1973 version rather than starting from Gowers's original. Having two authors made it necessary to abandon Gowers's frequent use of the first person; Fraser had retained it, stating "...the reader may take it that 'I' means either 'Gowers agreed with by Fraser' or 'Fraser, confident that Gowers would agree with him'". With joint authors for the new edition, this could not be sustained, and the change from first person to impersonal removed some of the book's previous character. An example is in the section on punctuation, where Gowers wrote, "The author of the style-book of the Oxford University Press ... says 'If you take hyphens seriously you will surely go mad'. I have no intention of taking hyphens seriously." In the new edition the second sentence read, "You should not take hyphens seriously". Rebecca Gowers objects that this approach "systematically depersonalise[s] the writing".

The new edition, in the same format as its two predecessors, is in blue cloth, with dust-jacket, and has 298 pages. A paperback version was issued by Penguin Books in 1987, and an American hardback edition was published in 1988 by Godine Publishing, Boston.

== 2014 revision by Rebecca Gowers ==
The last direct link between Plain Words and the public service was broken in 1996, when HMSO was dismembered under governmental privatisation policy. The 2014 edition of the book was published by Particular Books, an imprint of Penguin Books. It was printed on lower-weight paper and in a smaller format than its predecessors. The reviser was Rebecca Gowers, Ernest's great-granddaughter, a novelist and author of a non-fiction book about a Victorian murder. She begins the new edition with a twenty-page preface that includes a biographical sketch of Ernest Gowers and a history of the revisions after his death.

Unlike the three earlier revisers, Rebecca Gowers generally avoids merging her own comments with the original text. Her practice is to retain Ernest Gowers's remarks and append updated observations in a separate note. An example is the entry on the use of the noun "issue". The original words were:

This word has a very wide range of proper meanings as a noun, and should not be made to do any more work – the work, for instance of subject, topic, consideration and dispute.

To which the reviser has added:

Note: The workload of issue has grown enormously since Gowers wrote this, not least because it now also doubles up on the job done by problem. Thus a government department these days might release a disastrous consultation paper in terms of issues to do with interoperability issues, even as a Minister has personal issues that threaten to become an issue in the press, causing the Prime Minister to have a major issue with the Minister. In short, Gowers's warning went unheeded, and issue is being made to labour harder than ever.

Although Fraser, Greenbaum and Whitcut remained broadly faithful to Gowers's original structure and chapter headings, with some minor changes, Rebecca Gowers reverts to the original almost exclusively. The modernisations she introduces, such as the consideration of gender-neutral language, are incorporated into the chapters of the 1954 book.

== See also ==
- The Complete Plain Words (1954 UK copyright expired version) Note: UK Copyright allows 50 years after the death of the author Sir Ernest Gowers
- Fowler's Modern English Usage
- The Chicago Manual of Style
- The Elements of Style
- Hart's Rules
- Practical English Usage

== Sources ==
- Gowers, Ernest (1948). Plain Words: A Guide to the Use of English. London: His Majesty's Stationery Office. OCLC 2602739.
- Gowers, Ernest (1951). ABC of Plain Words. London: His Majesty's Stationery Office. OCLC 65646838.
- Gowers, Ernest (1954). The Complete Plain Words (1st combined ed.). London: Her Majesty's Stationery Office. OCLC 559778291.
- Gowers, Ernest (1973). Fraser, Bruce (ed.). The Complete Plain Words (2nd ed.). London: Her Majesty's Stationery Office. ISBN 0117003409.
- Gowers, Ernest (1986). Greenbaum, Sidney; Whitcut, Janet (eds.). The Complete Plain Words (3rd ed.). London / Boston: Her Majesty's Stationery Office / Godine. ISBN 9781567922035.
- Gowers, Ernest (2014). Gowers, Rebecca (ed.). Plain Words (4th ed.). London: Particular (Penguin). ISBN 978-0141975535.
- Scott, Ann (2009). Ernest Gowers: Plain Words and Forgotten Deeds. Basingstoke & New York: Palgrave Macmillan. ISBN 978-0230580251.
