= Euryn =

Euryn may refer to:

- Euryn (given name)

== Places ==
- Bryn Euryn, a Site of Special Scientific Interest in Conwy County Borough, Wales
- Llys Euryn, an historic estate owned by Ednyfed Fychan ap Cynwrig (d. 1246), ancestor of Owen Tudor

== People ==
- Euryn Ogwen Williams (1942–2021), Welsh broadcaster, presenter and writer
