= Aberarth =

Village in Ceredigion, Wales

Coordinates: 52.24849°N 4.23528°W

Aberarth is a village in Ceredigion, Wales, in the community of Dyffryn Arth, on the southern end of Cardigan Bay between Aberystwyth and Cardigan at the mouth of the River Arth on the A487 road. The Wales Coast Path passes through the village.

== History ==
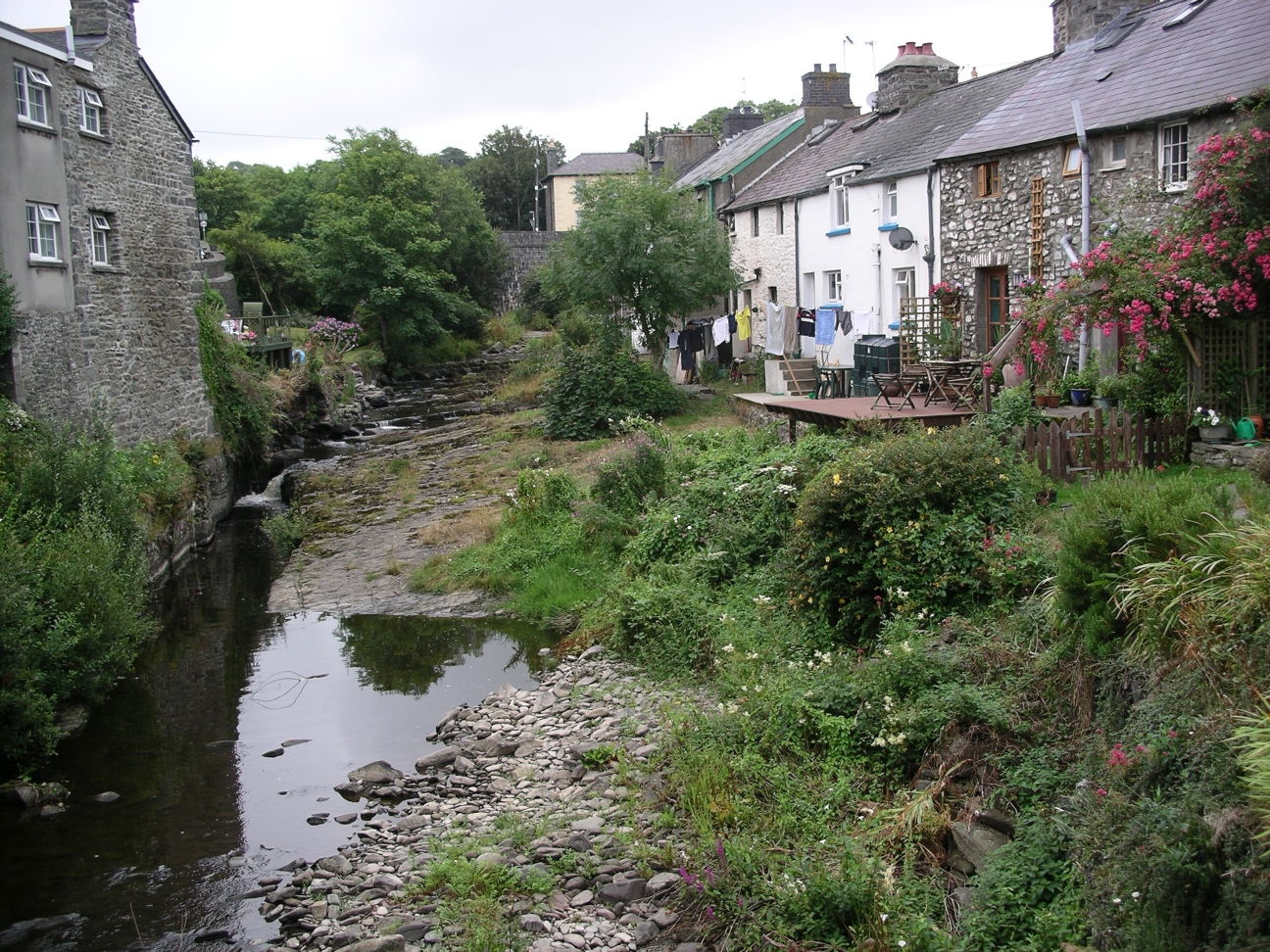
Aberarth village and River Arth Pont Aberarth is in the distance

The village has some historical significance, having been founded around the time of the Norman invasion. The Normans built Dineirth Castle some way up the river valley. During the 12th century Cistercian monks used the area as a seaport to import "Bath stone" from Bristol which they used for the building of Strata Florida Abbey on land granted to them by The Lord Rhys. Llanddewi Aberarth Church on a hill about half a mile to the south of the village is reputedly on the site of a 9th-century church. The present parish church has a Norman architecture tower with the rest rebuilt in the Victorian era in 1860. Secured to the wall inside the front door is the only Viking hogsback stone found in Wales.

Aberarth was involved in the shipbuilding industry before 1850, but the village faded with the decline of the industry.

It has some welcome visitors from the wild bird community; the red kite, peregrine falcon, chough and stonechat are some of the species to be found in the locality.

The beach, although covered with large pebbles, is very popular with surfers at certain times of the year.

In 2005, a public footpath and cycle lane was finished, connecting Aberarth to its larger neighbour, Aberaeron.

== Notable people ==
- Hywel Teifi Edwards (1934–2010), an academic, historian, born and raised in Aberarth; father of Huw Edwards, the BBC newsreader
- Michael Geraint Robinson (born 1962), physicist and engineer, contributed to 3D cinema; he invents items of optical engineering and display technology; born and raised in Aberarth.
- Cynan Jones (born 1975), award-winning author, resident of Aberarth.
