= Gower (magazine) =

Gower: Journal of the Gower Society is an English-language annual magazine containing articles, photographs, and news relating to the archaeology, history, natural history, and landscape of the Gower Peninsula. It was established in 1948 and is published by the Gower Society. The magazine has been digitized by the Welsh Journals Online project at the National Library of Wales.
