= Rhos-on-Sea =

Resort and community in Conwy, Wales

Rhos-on-Sea: Welsh: Llandrillo-yn-Rhos
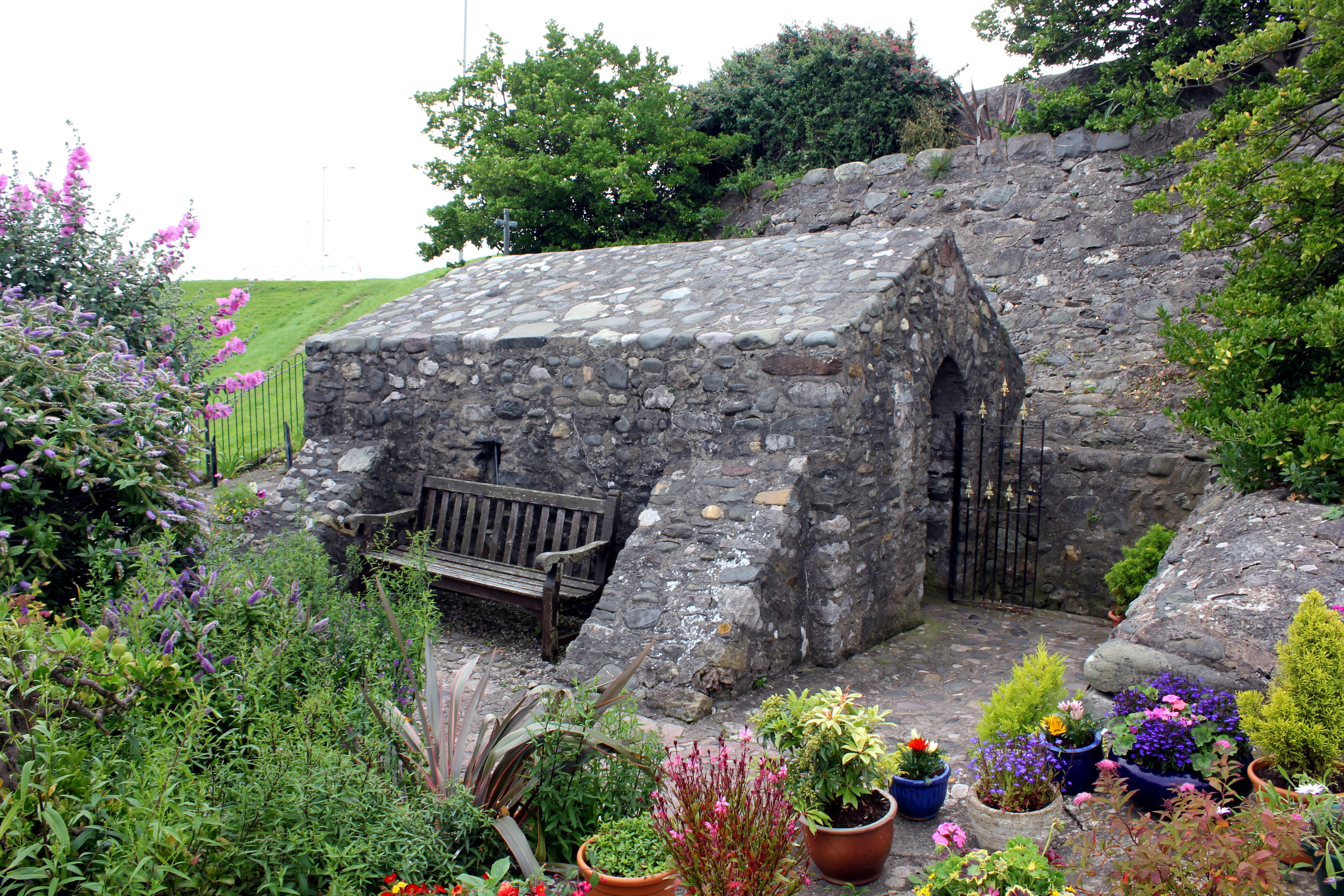
- Saint Trillo's Chapel

- Location within Conwy
- Population: 7,766 (2021)
- OS grid reference: SH842805
- Community: Rhos-on-Sea
- Principal area: Conwy
- Preserved county: Clwyd
- Country: Wales
- Sovereign state: United Kingdom
- Post town: COLWYN BAY
- Postcode district: LL28
- Dialling code: 01492
- Police: North Wales
- Fire: North Wales
- Ambulance: Welsh
- UK Parliament: Clwyd North
- Senedd Cymru – Welsh Parliament: Clwyd
- List of places UK Wales Conwy 53.309°N 3.738°W Map of the community

Rhos-on-Sea (Welsh: Llandrillo-yn-Rhos) is a seaside resort and community in Conwy County Borough, Wales. The population was 7,593 at the 2011 census. It adjoins Colwyn Bay and is named after the Welsh kingdom of Rhos established there in late Roman Britain as a sub-kingdom of Gwynedd. It later became a cantref (hundred).

== History ==
=== Bryn Euryn and Llys Euryn ===
Bryn Euryn is a hill overlooking Rhos-on-Sea on which there are the remains of a hillfort called Dinerth, the 'fort of the bear', and a limestone quarry. Ednyfed Fychan, 13th century seneschal to Llywelyn the Great and ancestor to the House of Tudor was granted the land and built a castle on the hill, of which all traces have disappeared, and a manor, Llys Euryn of which the ruins of its 15th-century reconstruction can be seen today.

=== Church of Llandrillo yn Rhos ===
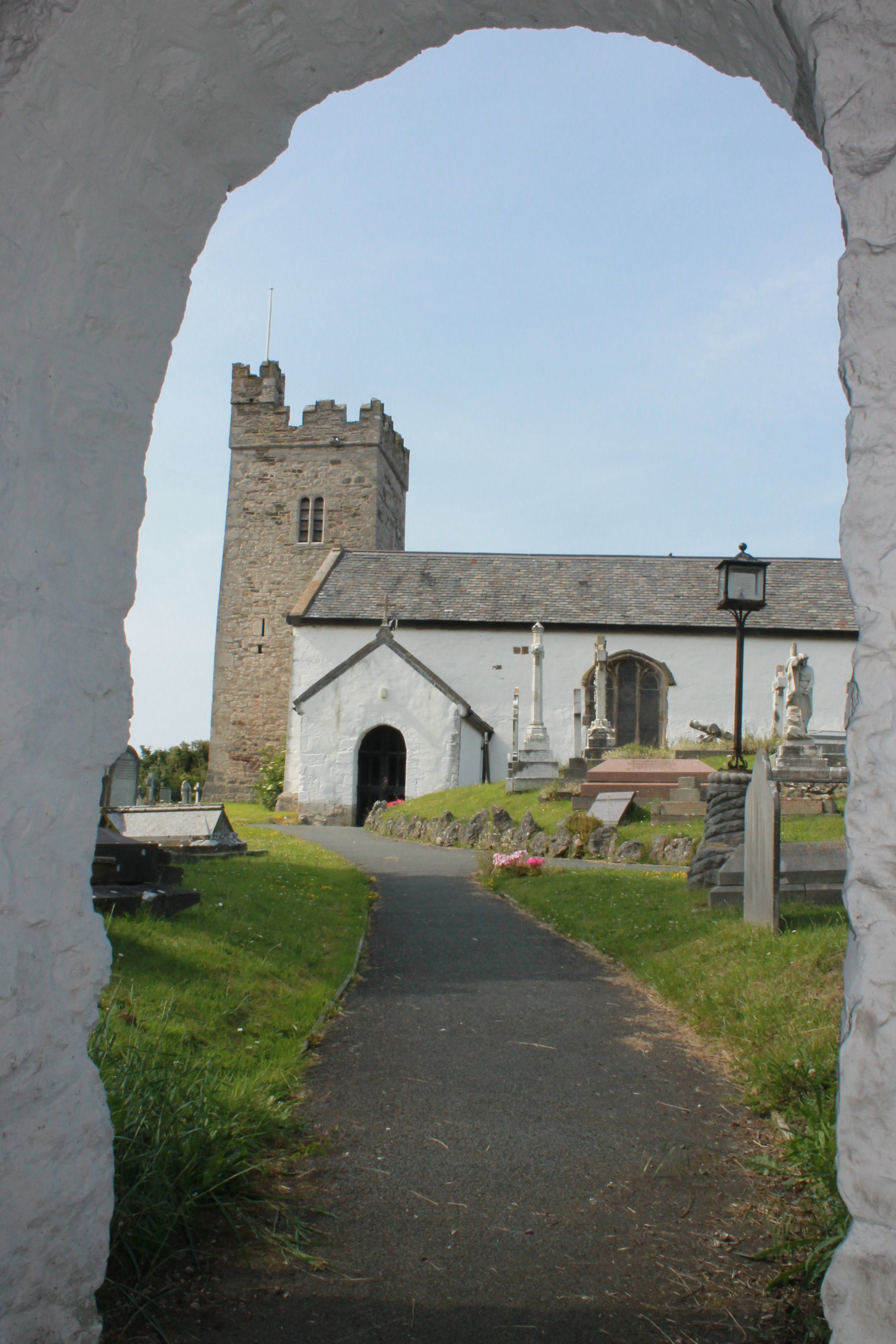

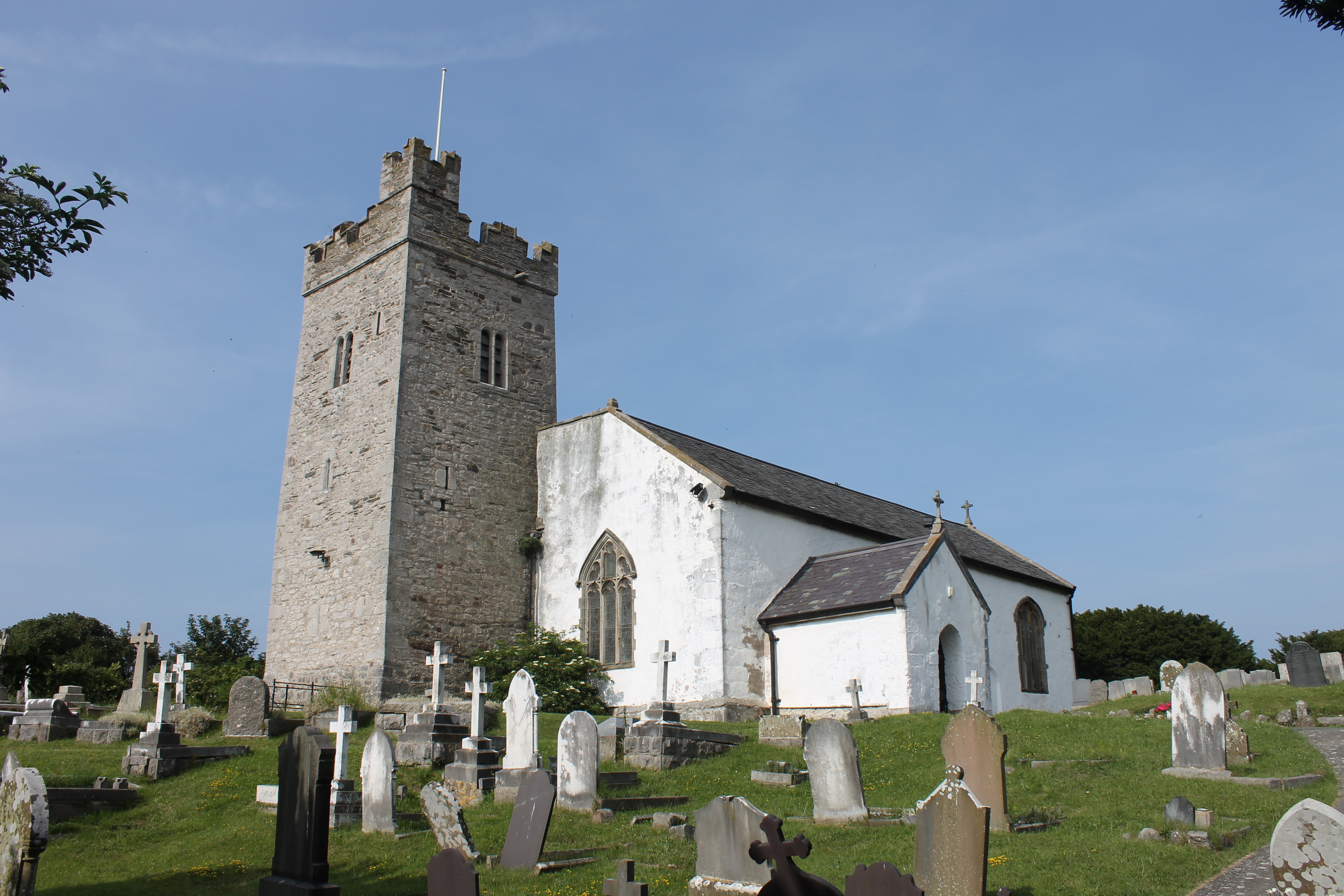

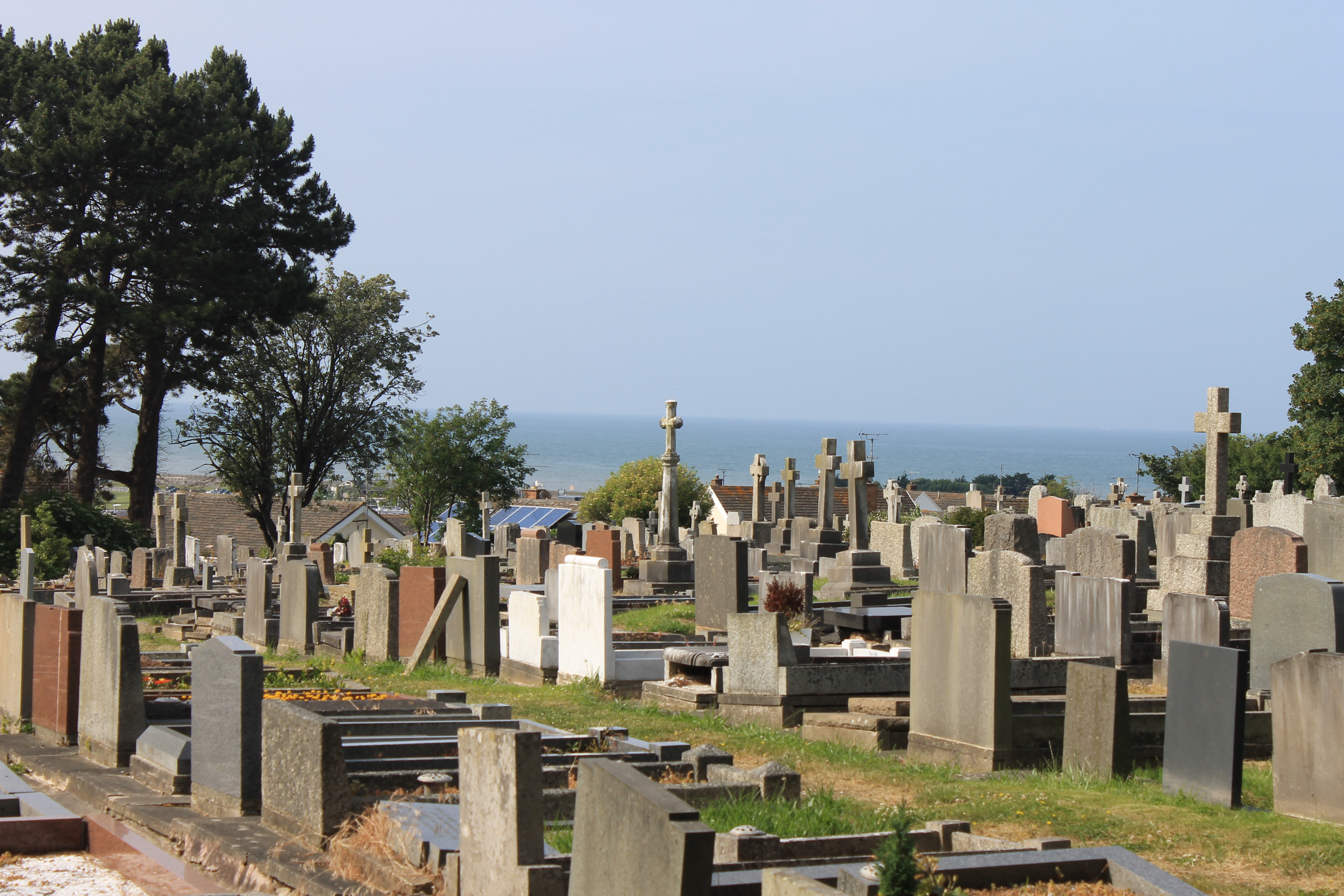

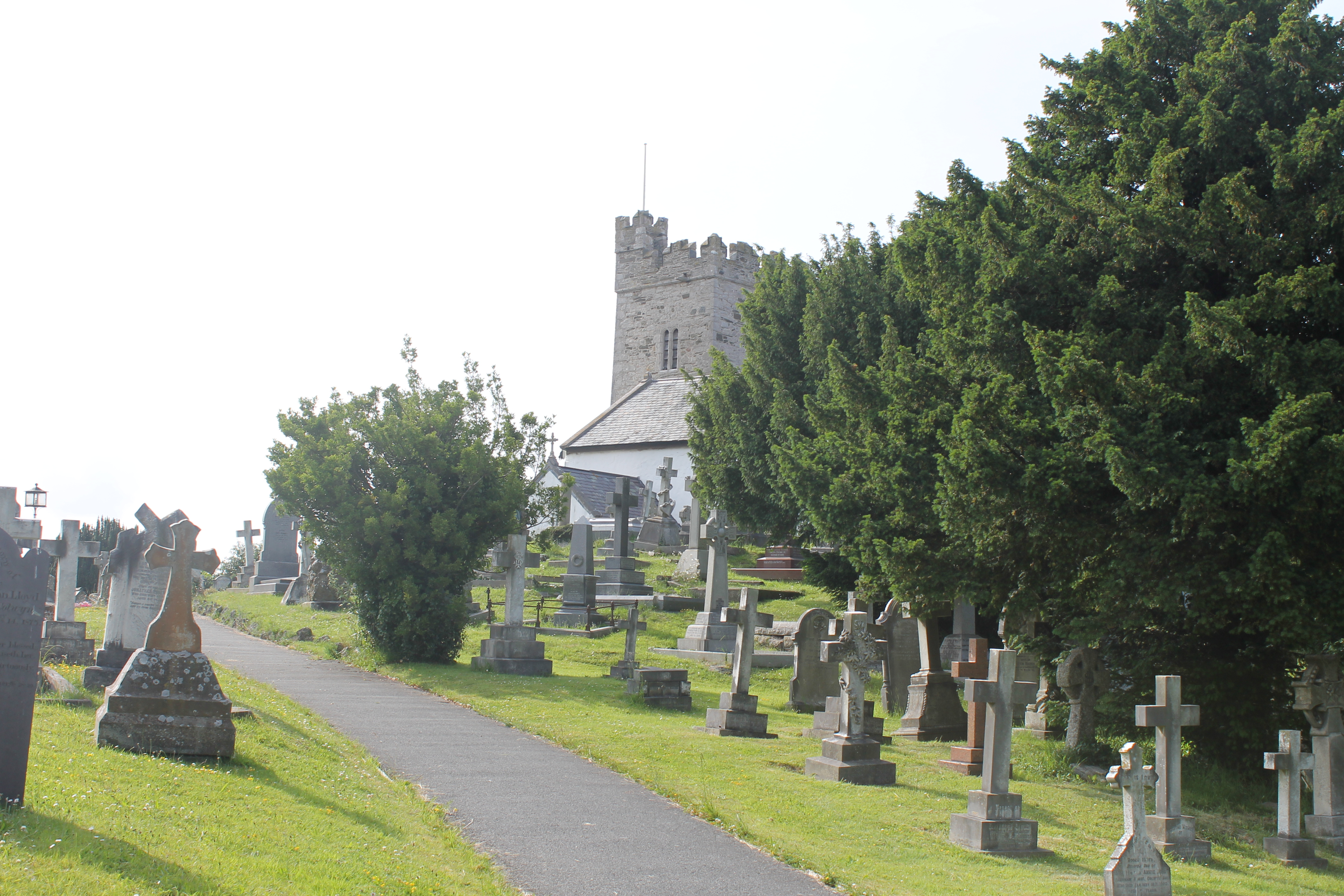

Llandrillo yn Rhos Church was built on the site of Ednyfed Fychan's private chapel and incorporates what was his tombstone, the history of this church goes back to the 13th century, but having been rebuilt over the centuries, the oldest parts of the present church are 15th century. A major restoration was carried out in 1857 and was criticised by some for amounting to 'vandalism', in particular the destruction of an ancient stained glass window. Nevertheless, it remains one of the most important historic buildings in North Wales.

The stone lych-gate was built in 1677 and is one of the oldest in the district; the sundial is from the early 18th century.

The graveyard here contains the grave of Harold Lowe, an officer on the RMS Titanic. He was widely regarded as a hero, helping many to safety with cool nerve and bravery. It also contains war graves of eight service personnel, two of World War I and six of World War II.

=== Rhos Fynach ===
In 1186 Llywelyn the Great permitted the establishment of the Cistercian Aberconwy Abbey, and the monks built a fishing weir on the sea shore below Bryn Euryn. The place became known as Rhos Fynach, heath of the monks. In a charter of 1230, Llywelyn sanctioned the purchase by Ednyfed Fychan of land at Rhos Fynach and in 1289, the abbey moved to Maenan (becoming Maenan Abbey), and the weir was ceded to Ednyfed's estate. Eventually Rhos Fynach and the weir came into the hands of Robert Dudley, Earl of Leicester, who in 1575 granted it to a Captain Morgan ap John ap David, a privateer, for services rendered against the enemies of Queen Elizabeth I at sea. (This is not the famous pirate of the Caribbean Captain Henry Morgan who lived in the century following).

The weir continued to provide a prosperous livelihood through to the early 20th century: during a single night in 1850, 35,000 herring were caught, and 10 tons of mackerel were removed in one tide as late as 1907. Because such weirs decimated inshore fish stocks, Parliament banned them in 1861 unless it could be shown they pre-dated the Magna Carta, which the then owners, the Parry Evans family, were able to prove. Their estate included Rhos Fynach house, also known as Rhos Farm, on the Promenade near St Trillo's Chapel. The house is now a pub and restaurant. Its date of construction is not known for sure, but it is considered to have been started by the Cistercians before the dissolution of the monasteries.

The fishing weir fell into disuse during World War I and most traces have disappeared. Trial excavation of the site in 1993 recorded constructions carbon 14-dated between 1500 and 1660.

=== St Trillo's Chapel ===
The 6th-century St Trillo's Chapel (Welsh: Capel Sant Trillo), which was the mother church of a large parish which included places as far apart as Eglwysbach and Eglwys Rhos (Llan Rhos).

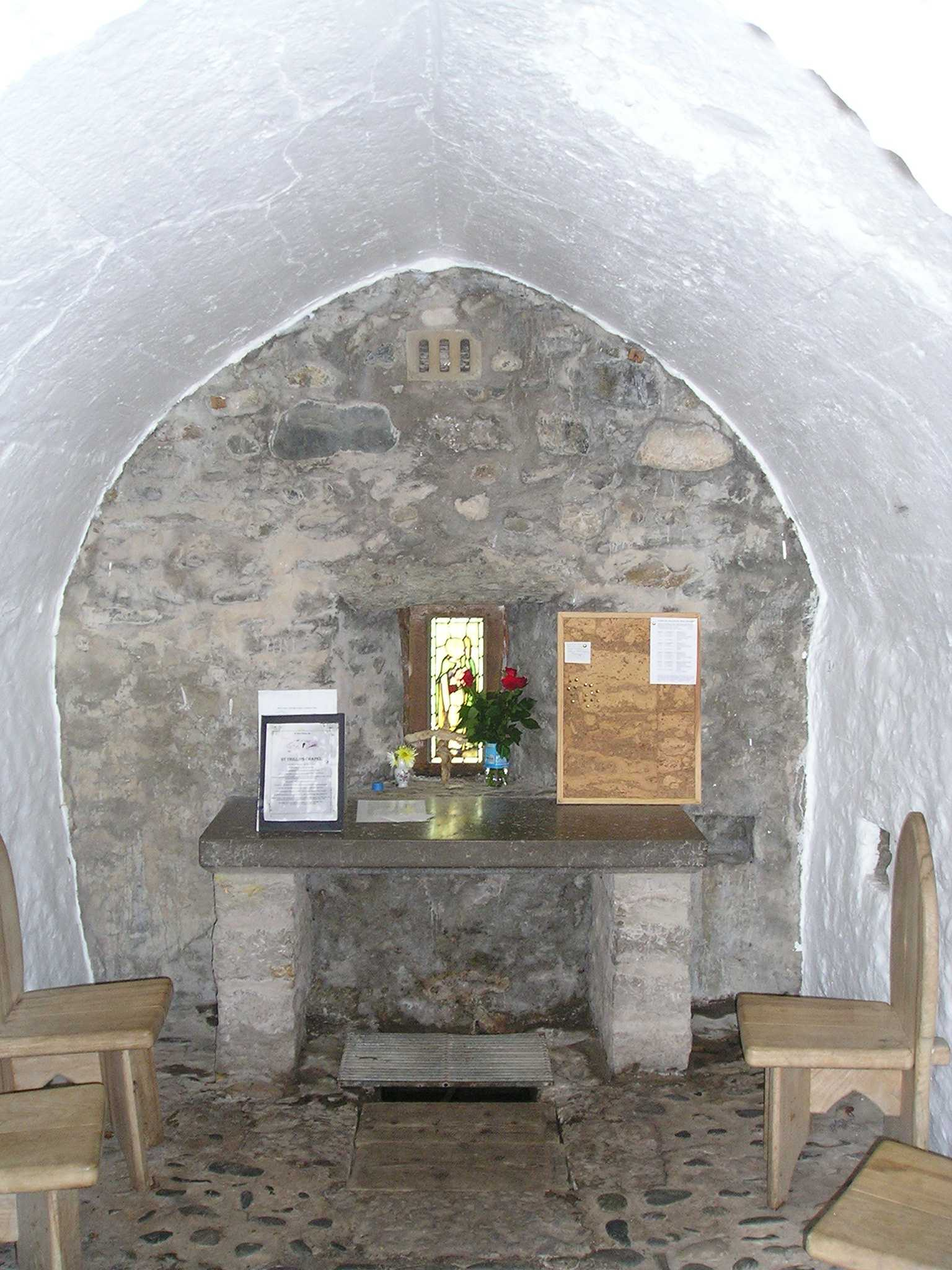
The tiny chapel of Saint Trillo on the foreshore at Rhos-on-Sea

The chapel by the sea is on the site of a pre-Christian, sacred holy well; the altar is built directly over the pure water of the well. Saint Trillo, the son of Ithel Hael from Llydaw (Brittany) also founded a church at Llandrillo in Denbighshire. Trillo's brother Tygai (Llandygai) founded a church near Penrhyn, Bangor; their sister Llechid founded a church (Llanllechid) in the uplands above Penrhyn.

=== Trams ===
The Llandudno and Colwyn Bay Electric Railway operated an electric tramway service between Llandudno and Rhos-on-Sea from 1907 and extended to Colwyn Bay in 1908. The service closed in 1956.

== Other features ==
- Rhos-on-Sea also has the first permanent puppet theatre to be built in Britain, the Harlequin Puppet Theatre, which opened on 7 July 1958, when it won the Civic Trust Award for its design. Founders Eric Bramall and Chris Somerville have also created many puppet programmes for BBC children's television over a forty-year period. Many of the puppets created for these television series are now on display at the National Trust property of Penrhyn Castle.
- Coleg Llandrillo Cymru, the former Llandrillo Technical College.
- Ysgol Llandrillo yn Rhos, a mixed county primary day school.
- The Society of St. Pius X operates a Traditionalist Catholic chapel in a renovated Methodist church on Conwy Road.

== Governance ==
The community boundaries are coterminous with the electoral ward of Llandrillo-yn-Rhos, which elects four county councillors to Conwy County Borough Council.

Rhos-on-Sea is also divided into two community wards, of Rhos and Dinarth. Rhos elects up to five councillors and Dinarth elects up to three councillors to the Bay of Colwyn Town Council (which was formed in 1996).

== Sport ==
Colwyn Bay Cricket Club was founded in 1923 and started playing at Penrhyn Avenue, Rhos-on-Sea in 1924. Glamorgan Cricket has been hosted here intermittently since the 1960s.

Rhos United Football Club currently play in the North Wales Coast East Premier Division.

== Notable people ==
- According to legend, Madog ap Owain Gwynedd, a Welsh prince of Gwynedd, sailed from here in 1170 and discovered America, over three hundred years before Christopher Columbus's famous voyage in 1492. This event was recorded by a plaque on one of the properties on the sea-front. This property was called "Odstone" at no. 179, Marine Drive which, as of June 2012, had become neglected. It was demolished as of September 2017.
- The poet and visual artist David Jones visited Rhos-on-Sea in 1904 when he was 9. It was his first ever trip to Wales and it made an enormous impression on him. His father's family lived in Rhos, and the young Jones played with his cousins at St. Trillo's Chapel, and on Bryn Euryn. He also particularly loved the fishing weir just a few yards from St. Trillos. These were formative influences both on his writing and visual art. He wrote that this visit left 'an indelible mark on my soul'.

In 1937, after the death of his mother, Jones revisited Rhos. He found it a 'wilderness of villas and bungalows'. The fishing weir had gone (there remain a few stumps), and the chapel was now 'cleared and cared for', but it had 'lost half its numinous feeling'.

- Harold Lowe 5th officer of Titanic, is buried at Llandrillo-yn-Rhos churchyard
- Thérèse Coffey, Baroness Coffey MP [Con., Suffolk Coastal, 2010–2024] was partly educated in Rhos-on-Sea
- Llewelyn Wyn Griffith, author of Up to Mametz, born 1890
- Wilf Wooller, Welsh rugby international, Glamorgan cricketer and Cardiff City footballer, was born here.

== See also ==
- Colwyn Bay
