= Gower's Island =

Island in Davidson County, Tennessee, United States

Coordinates: 36.210°N 86.976°W

Gower's Island is an island in the Cumberland River in Tennessee, United States. It is the third river island between the Old Hickory Lock and Dam and the Cheatham Dam, and it spans 16 acres. It was settled by James Russell and Abel Gower, Sr., two North Carolinians, in the late 18th century. As of 2015, it is owned by a private entity.
