= Patrick Gowers =

English film composer (1936–2014)

William Patrick Gowers (5 May 1936 – 30 December 2014) was an English composer, mainly known for his film scores.

== Early life and education ==
Born in Islington, Gowers was the son of Stella Gowers (née Pelly) and Richard Gowers, a solicitor. His great-grandfather was the neurologist Sir William Richard Gowers, and his grandfather was the civil servant and writer Sir Ernest Gowers. He was educated at Radley College and later read music at The University of Cambridge. Whilst at Cambridge, he composed music for the Cambridge Footlights and taught composition part-time. He completed his doctorate, on the music of Erik Satie, in 1966.

== Career ==
Gowers served as assistant conductor of Bill Russo's London Jazz Orchestra. In 1964, he was music director of the Royal Shakespeare Company's productions of Marat/Sade in the West End and in New York. He subsequently composed the music for the 1967 film of Marat/Sade. In the 1970s, he directed the electronic music studio at Dartington and played keyboards for the New Swingle Singers.

Gowers began composing for feature and documentary films more extensively after his work on the film of Marat/Sade. Another notable early film score was for the 1969 Tony Richardson film of Hamlet. Other films for which he composed the music included:

- Thomas er Fredloes (1968)
- Balladen om Carl-Henning (1969)
- Hamlet (1969)
- The Virgin and the Gypsy (1970)
- Giv Gud en Chance Om Soendagen (1970)
- The Boy Who Turned Yellow (1972)
- Farlige kys (1972)
- A Bigger Splash (1974)
- Children of Rage (1975)
- The Shetland Experience (1977)
- Stevie (1978)
- Whoops Apocalypse (1986)
- Comic Act (1998)

Gowers started writing music for television in the 1970s. In 1982, he won the BAFTA original music award for his scores for Smiley's People, The Woman in White and I Remember Nelson. Gowers composed the music to The Adventures of Sherlock Holmes and its sequels, starring Jeremy Brett, whose series ran from 1984 to 1994; the soundtrack was released in 1987. Gowers also scored the TV film adaptations with Brett of The Sign of Four (1987) and The Hound of the Baskervilles (1988). Amongst other TV series for which he composed the music are Therese Raquin (1980), Anna Karenina (1985), and Forever Green (1989).

Gowers' concert music included works written for the guitarist John Williams: Chamber Concerto for Guitar and Rhapsody for Guitar, Electric Guitars and Electric Organ. He was also noted for his choral music, including his setting of Veni Sancte Spiritus and his commission for the consecration of Richard Harries as bishop of Oxford, Viri Galilaei (1987). He also composed a cantata (1991) and several other anthems such as Aveto Augustine and Holy, Holy, Holy. Other works include his "Toccata" for organ, commissioned by Simon Preston and joined over a decade later by a fugue, and his "Occasional Trumpet Voluntary".

== Personal life ==
Gowers married Caroline Maurice in 1961. The couple had three children, the mathematician Sir Timothy Gowers, the writer Rebecca Gowers, and the violinist Katharine Gowers. His widow and children survive him.
