= Royal Commission on Capital Punishment 1949–1953 =

British royal commission

The Royal Commission on Capital Punishment 1949–1953 reviewed the application of death penalty in the United Kingdom, including the questions of what crimes should receive the death penalty and what method of execution should be employed. The commission was set up by the Attlee government in an attempt to defuse the long-term political debate over capital punishment. The Royal Warrant establishing the commission (dated 4 May 1949) instructed their inquiry to assume the retention of the death penalty. In their report, the Commission described their own task as "trying to find some practical half-way house between the present scope of the death penalty and its abolition".

The thirteen commissioners met 63 times in total, holding their first meeting on 27 May 1949. Its Chairman was Sir Ernest Gowers GCB, GBE. Gowers was profoundly affected by the evidence presented to the commission and said later that what he learned as chairman of the commission converted him from vague support of capital punishment to strong opposition.

In order to determine which cases of homicide ought to receive the death penalty, the commissioners sought to devise a classification of murder in terms of degrees of severity. However, their conclusion from that attempt was that "the object of our quest is chimerical ... and must be abandoned".

It also made recommendations responding to criticism of rules for the insanity defense in a criminal case. It responded to the M'Naghten rule that a person is legally insane if a mental disease prevents their knowledge of the nature or quality of their criminal act or that the act is wrong, and irresistible impulse rules that mental disease caused a lack of volitional control even if defendant knew the nature and quality of her act and that it was wrong. Its report said M'Naughten should be abrogated and the jury should be left "to determine whether at the time of the act the accused was suffering from disease of the mind (or mental deficiency) to such a degree that he ought not be held responsible."
