= William Frederick Gowers =

Sir William Frederick Gowers KCMG
- Sir William Frederick Gowers (second from left), poses with members of the 1931 Trader Horn movie company: director W.S. Van Dyke, Edwina Booth, Harry Carey and Duncan Renaldo

Lieutenant Governor of Northern Nigeria
- In office 1921–1925
- Preceded by: Herbert Symonds Goldsmith
- Succeeded by: Sir Herbert Richmond Palmer

Governor of Uganda
- In office 18 May 1925 – 23 Nov 1932
- Preceded by: Geoffrey Francis Archer
- Succeeded by: Bernard Henry Bourdillon

Personal details
- Born: 31 December 1875
- Died: 7 October 1954 (aged 78)
- Relations: William Gowers (neurologist) (father), Ernest Gowers (brother)

Sir William Frederick Gowers, KCMG (31 December 1875 – 7 October 1954) was a British colonial administrator who was Governor of Uganda from 1925 to 1932.

== Early years ==
Gowers was born 31 December 1875 in London. He was educated at Rugby School and then at Trinity College, Cambridge, where he graduated BA in 1898 with a First in the Classical Tripos. He retained his interest in the classics throughout his life. He went to Africa in 1899 as an employee of the British South Africa Company (BSA) and became an assistant Native Commissioner in Matabeleland, in what is now western Zimbabwe, leaving this post in 1902.

He was the elder brother of Ernest Gowers.

== Nigeria ==
In 1902, Gowers resigned from the BSA and joined the Colonial Service, taking the job of third-class resident in Northern Nigeria. He took up this post two years after the Protectorate of Nigeria had been declared, and saw the occupation of the Moslem Emirates of the region under Frederick Lugard's policy of indirect rule. During the First World War Gowers served as political adviser in the Cameroons Expeditionary Force (1915–1916). He rose to the position of Lieutenant-Governor of the Northern Province of Nigeria.

== Uganda ==
From 1925 to 1932 Gowers was Governor and Commander-in-Chief of the Uganda Protectorate. Soon after taking office, Gowers proposed a remedy to the practice of payment of envujo on cash crops, which colonial officials had denounced as "repugnant to justice and morality". His recommendation was to make envujo payable to the British administration rather than to African landlords. On the question of the Toro Kingdom, which the British had restored after driving out the Banyoro, Gowers felt that the agreement made at the time was simply a declaration of principle by the protecting power. The British were free to deal with the kingdom as they saw fit.

Committees on language policy in Uganda had recommended teaching Acholi in the north, Teso in parts of the eastern province and Luganda elsewhere.

As governor of Uganda, Gowers pointed out the local importance of Swahili, a Bantu language also spoken in Kenya and Tanganyika and the eastern Congo. He was perhaps anticipating the need for a common language in a federation of territories in the African Great Lakes region. Gowers respected African sovereignty and took care to always be deferential towards the kings of Bunyoro and Uganda. He saw to it that medicine be widely distributed to the indigenous majority so that they would not die from treatable diseases. In particular, the distribution of quinine for malaria became common.

When Gowers could not convince the colonial office to increase the money spent in Uganda for African civil servants' wages, Gowers undertook the (at the time controversial) step of firing over a dozen of his European staff members in the capital and then using the money thus saved to dramatically increase the pay of all of the indigenous African civil servants who worked directly under him. Gowers oversaw the introduction of government subsidies for indigenous farmers, distributing equipment such as fence-making materials, shovels, fertilizer while also guaranteeing the purchase of certain amounts of crops in order to create a thriving agricultural economy. This program was in effect from 1926 to 1931. Gowers was ultimately forced to end the program due to the financial restrictions of the international Great Depression. However he managed to keep the program going throughout most of 1931, despite struggling to do so, by cutting funding for other things (including his own security team). He ended the expensive housing for European civil servants completely (to much protest) but even that only freed up enough money to continue the agricultural subsidies for a few months. However, even with budget cuts in other places he was forced to end the program in late 1931.

In 1926, Sir Edward Grigg, Governor of British Kenya, called a conference in Nairobi to discuss closer union of the African Great Lakes colonies, which Sir William Gowers fully supported the idea on the grounds it would massively increase funding for the Uganda colony. However, Governor Donald Charles Cameron of Tanganyika was firmly against it, thinking it would be unjust to Africans due to the fact that part of the plan included land in Tanganyika being set aside for European settlers as had been done in Kenya. Notably, the plan did not call for any land in Uganda to be set aside for Europeans, and it was on this basis (on the basis that it not set aside any land in Uganda for Europeans) that Gowers accepted it.

== Later career ==
Gowers was appointed Senior Crown Agent for the Colonies (1932–1938), Deputy Chairman of the Cereals Control Board (1939–1940) and Civil Defence Liaison Officer, Southern Command (1940–1942). Gowers died on 7 October 1954, aged 78.
