= Eirwen Gwynn =

Welsh writer, teacher and scientist

- Born: Eirwen Meiriona St John Williams; 1 December 1916; Liverpool, England
- Died: 26 January 2007 (aged 90); Tal-y-bont, Ceredigion, Wales
- Occupations: Writer, teacher, physicist
- Years active: 1942–1999
- Spouse: Harri Gwynn (m. 1942; died 1985)
- Children: 1

Eirwen Meiriona St John Gwynn (née Williams; Welsh: [ˈe(i)ruːɛn] /ˈaɪərwɛn/; 1 December 1916 – 26 January 2007) was a Welsh nationalist writer, teacher and physicist. Born in Liverpool, she read physics at the University College of North Wales and later earned a Doctor of Philosophy degree in that field in 1942. Gwynn taught physics at Rhyl Grammar School and later worked as an assistant account at the Government Exchequer and Audit Department. She then worked as a full-time lecturer for the Workers' Educational Association and was a freelance writer who created 1,500 works on social development and science in the English and Welsh printed press. Gwynn also authored multiple books and short stories, won awards during her career, promoted the Welsh language by being a member of four committees and served as president of two societies.

== Early life and education ==
Gwynn was born Eirwen Meiriona St John Williams on 1 December 1916 at 99 Shiel Road, Newsham Park, Liverpool; her father wrote her date of birth as 12 December to avoid a fine for late registration of birth. and was disappointed his first born was a girl. She was the eldest child of the self-trained dentist William St John Williams and his wife Annie (née Williams); the family resided amongst a large Welsh diaspora in Liverpool. Gwynn had a younger brother, Gwilym Gareth. Her father encouraged her to become interested in current affairs, read widely and become proud of her family roots in North West Wales. From 1923 to 1927, Gwynn attended Birchfield Road Council School, and enjoyed on-stage performing. She learnt to resist bullying from her fellow pupils and teachers because she was Welsh.

When Gwynn was ten years old, the family moved to Llangefni, because one of her father's siblings had found employment as Cardiff's Regional Dental Officer for Wales. She was taught at Pwllheli County School, and was attracted to chemistry, mathematics and physics due to influential teachers and her father. Gwynn defied the school's predominant English-language education, and assaulted an English mistress, who called the girls in the class "Welsh scum". In 1930, she joined Plaid Cymru, five years after the party was founded. Gwynn earned a scholarship to read physics at the University College of North Wales in 1934, after declining to attend the University of Cambridge. She was the only woman in her class to study physics at the college, and received abuse from the external examiner because she was a woman. Gwynn graduated three years later with a higher second class degree.

Afterwards, she remained in Bangor to research X-ray crystallography, and received a Doctor of Philosophy in physics in 1942, becoming the first woman to graduate with such honours at the college.

== Career ==
Gwynn and her future husband Harri Gwynn established a Plaid Cymru branch at the university, and was a member of Mudiad Gwerin ('the Peasant Movement'), which united nationalists and socialists. She was head of the physics department at Rhyl Grammar School between 1941 and 1942, before spending the remainder of the Second World War in Warwick and then London at the Government Exchequer and Audit Department as an assistant accountant. Gwynn had an ovarian growth removed and the experienced caused her to develop a dislike of using nuclear technology and nuclear power. According to Meic Stephens of The Independent, she was unsuccessful in other occupations because the interview panel had not expected to meet a woman and did not want to accept that one had a degree.

After she was unable to form a Welsh-speaking school in London, the family chose to move close to the Welsh-speaking village of Rhoslan on the Llŷn Peninsula in 1950. The family took a stockholding that had no electricity, telephone communication or running water; neither had any experience of farming. Gwynn found a job working as a full-time lecturer for the Workers' Educational Association, from 1970 to 1979 in Anglesey, Arfon, Eifionydd and Llŷn, becoming according to her biography written by Deri Tomos in the Dictionary of Welsh Biography "one of the most important interpreters of science and technology – and their implications – to the Welsh speaking community." During her career, she became a freelancer, writing about 1,500 works on social development and science in the Welsh and English printed press. Papers she wrote for included The Scientist, New Scientist, The Observer, Scientific American, The Sunday Times, The Listener, New Internationalist and Y Faner. Gwynn also produced a weekly column of science in Y Cymro for 13 years and a weekly column on nutrition for Y Cymro for 10 years. She also appeared on radio and television.

Gwynn reached a large audience by remaining independent from organisations or those from a narrow academic expertise and became a national celebrity in Wales. She expanded her role to write about alternative medicine, nutrition, women's status in society and the dangers of nuclear power. Gwynn authored the space exploration book I'r Lleuad a thu hwnt ('To the Moon and Beyond') in 1964, a tip book for women in societal change called Cyfrol o gyngor a chyfarwyddyd ('Marriage. A volume of advice and guidance') in 1966 and a healthy eating book called Bwyta i Fyw ('Eating to Live') in 1987. She was the recipient of a BBC drama writing competition award for her work on a scientific field in 1970. Seven years later, a painting Gwynn produced was exhibited at the National Eisteddfod Art and Crafts exhibition; she preferred to paint in charcoal, oil and watercolour.

In 1977, she won a prize for a short story at the National Eisteddfod of Wales, and on more than one occasion she came close to winning the Prose Medal. From these competitions, Gwynn authored Dau Lygad Du ('Two Black Eyes') in 1979, Caethiwed ('Captivity') two years later, Cwsg ni Ddaw ('Sleep will Not Come') in 1982, Torri'n Rhydd ('Breaking Free') in 1990 and Dim ond Un ('Only One') in 1997. In 1999, she wrote her autobiography Ni 'n Dau: hanes dau gariad ('Us Two: the story of two lovers'), which discusses her views on religion and life experiences during her early years. That same year, Gwynn appeared in court because she did not pay her television licence fee in protest over the lack of Welsh-language programming, and was issued a fine; the BBC did not pick up her perception. She was one of five individuals to sign a protest to prevent English-only speakers from having an escort at the National Eisteddfod in Newport in 2004.

She authored and co-edited the 600-page bilingual volume of books called Ein Canrif, 100 mlynedd o hanes ardal Ceulanmaesmawr ('Ein Canrif, 100 years of the history of the Ceulanmaesmawr area') in 2005. Gwynn became a Druid (Welsh: Derwydd) in the Gorsedd of the Bards in 1985, earned a Bangor University Fellowship in 2002, and was named the recipient of the Science and Technology Medal at the National Eisteddfod in June 2006. She promoted the Welsh language by becoming a member of the Central Advisory Council for Education (Wales), the Court of the National Library, Guild of Graduates Standing Committee and the University of Wales Court. Gwynn was also a president of the British Scientific Society, and of Y Gymdeithas Wyddonol Genedlaethol (the National Scientific Society).

== Personal life ==
She married the broadcaster Harri Gwynn on 1 January 1942. They remained married until his death in 1985. They had a son, Iolo ap Gwynn, who went on to become a lecturer in biology at the University of Wales and joined Plaid Cymru. Gwynn died suddenly of a heart attack at her home in Tal-y-bont, Ceredigion, on 26 January 2007; she had rheumatism that kept her housebound. She was buried alongside her husband close to Llanrug in accordance with her wishes.

== Personality and legacy ==
Gwynn described her outlook on life as "quite cruel and sometimes dark", and was a feminist. In 2018, Women's Equality Network Wales named her one of the 100 Welsh Women as a means of commemorating the 100th anniversary of the passage of the Representation of the People Act 1918. The National Library of Wales holds a collection relating to Gwynn. They include her personal papers and objects connected to her life's work.
