= Llys Euryn =

Archaeological site in Rhos-on-Sea, Conwy, Wales

Coordinates: 53.305°N 3.754°W

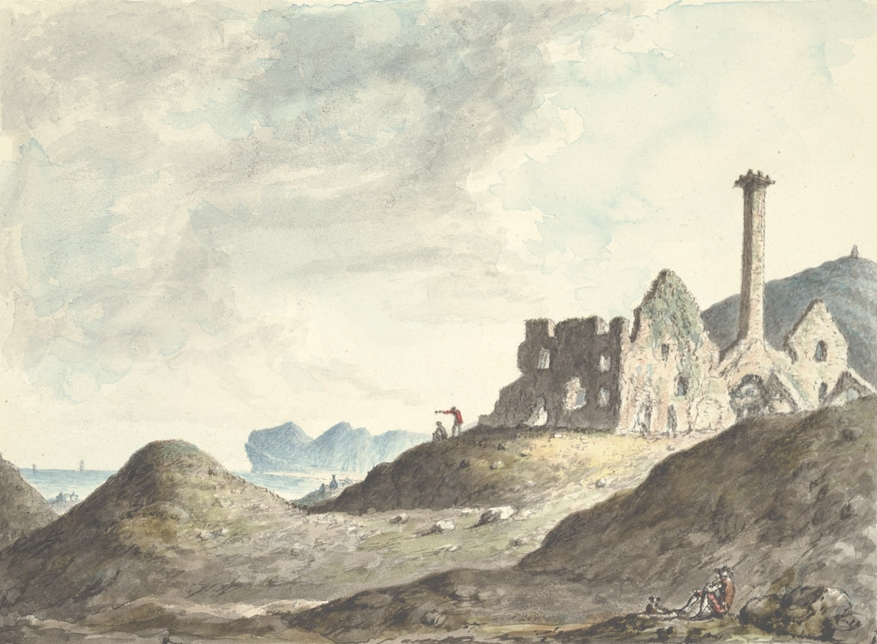
Llys Euryn, 1795

The ruined remains of Llys Euryn (Welsh: [ˈɛirɪn]; /ˈɛərɪn/ AYR-in) sit upon a wooded shoulder of Bryn Euryn — a limestone hill on the outskirts of Rhos-on-Sea (Welsh: Llandrillo-yn-Rhos) in the county of Conwy, north Wales. Three sides of the building remain, with the remains of interior walls, a complete fireplace and chimney stack rising to around 50 feet, two other fireplaces and windows. More than anything else, its history makes this one of the more intriguing and important historical buildings in north Wales.

View of the entire Llys Euryn site

== History ==
Llys Euryn was one of the local estates in the Dinerth area owned and occupied by Ednyfed Fychan (d. 1246) — full name Ednyfed Fychan ap Cynwrig — who was seneschal to the Kingdom of Gwynedd in northern Wales, serving Llywelyn the Great and his son Dafydd ap Llywelyn. He was the ancestor of Owen Tudor and thereby of the Tudor dynasty.

It is thought that the house was burnt in 1409 during the revolt of Owain Glyndŵr and restored or rebuilt shortly afterwards. The present structure is late medieval and may be the house occupied by the Conwy Family until 1629 when it was sold to Sir Peter Mutton.

During the working life (end of the 19th century) of the nearby limestone quarry, a small hut was built against one of the walls which was believed to house the blasting materials.

An amateur attempt was made to demolish the distinctive chimney stack and although a hole was blown in the side of the fireplace, the chimney remained standing. The site was left overgrown and largely overlooked until the late 1990s.

View through original arched doorway

During 1998/1999 the site was subject to a serious conservation project. Much of the vegetation was stripped away, the interior walls and a large fireplace were uncovered, the blasting hut removed and the hole in the chimney filled-in. Finally, stone chippings were added to prevent further vegetation growth and an informative sign about the sites history was erected.
