= Gower (surname) =

Gower, as a surname of Anglo-Norman origin. Notable people with the surname include:

- Andre Gower (born 1973), American child actor
- Andrew Gower (born 1989), British actor
- Craig Gower (born 1978), Australian rugby footballer
- David Gower (born 1957), English former cricketer
- David Gower (rugby league) (born 1985), Australian Rugby league player
- David J. Gower, palaeontologist
- Erasmus Gower (1742–1814), Welsh naval officer and colonial governor
- Flynn Gower (born 1972), Australian musician with the rock band Cog
- George Gower (c. 1540–1596), English portrait painter
- H. D. G. Leveson Gower (1873–1954), English cricketer
- Henry Gower, fourteenth century canonist, Chancellor of the University of Oxford, and bishop
- Humphrey Gower (1638–1711), English clergyman and academic
- Iris Gower, pen name of novelist Iris Davies (1935–2010)
- Jack Gower, Irish alpine ski racer
- Janice Gower, English bowls player
- Jessica Gower (born 1977), Australian actress
- John Gower (c. 1330–1403), English poet
- John Gower (politician) (1941–2011), American politician from Wisconsin
- Laurence Gower (1913–1967), English lawyer and academic
- Lily Gower (1877–1959), English croquet player
- Luke Gower, Australian musician for rock band Cog and Flynn's brother
- Mark Gower (born 1978), English footballer
- Pauline Gower (1910–1947), British pilot and writer, head of the female branch of the Air Transport Auxiliary during the Second World War
- Patrick Gower (born 1976/1977), a New Zealand journalist and the former editor of Newshub
- Raymond Gower (1916–1989), Welsh Member of Parliament
- Richard Hall Gower (1768–1833), English mariner, empirical philosopher, nautical inventor, entrepreneur, and humanitarian
- Lord Ronald Gower (1845–1916), British aristocrat, Member of Parliament, sculptor and writer
- Rosalie Gower (1931–2013), Canadian civil servant and activist
- Sir Thomas Gower, 2nd Baronet (c. 1605–1672), twice High Sheriff of Yorkshire
- William Gower (born c. 1662), English Member of Parliament

== See also ==
- Leveson-Gower, the name of a Scottish noble family
- Gowers, another surname
