= George Henry Vallins =

George Henry Vallins (29 May 1897 – 30 October 1956), who wrote as G H Vallins, was an English schoolmaster, grammarian and author. His best-known books are Good English (1951) and Better English (1953).

== Life and career ==
Vallins was born in Sevenoaks, Kent. He was educated at Beckenham County School and King's College London. He served in the army towards the end of the First World War, after which he became a schoolmaster, first at Wreights School, Faversham, and then for many years at Selhurst High School, Croydon. He published a volume of poems, and co-edited several anthologies for the use of English teachers.

In 1936, together with H A Treble, he published An ABC of English Usage, described by The Times as "an admirable if sometimes controversial little work." After the Second World War he published The Making and Meaning of Words, and then, according to The Times, "his best and wittiest handbooks", Good English (1951) and Better English (1953). The paper commented, "Both are delightful reading not merely for the soundness of the doctrine but for the combative tone of the writing."

Vallins was a contributor to Punch and The Times Educational Supplement. He died in hospital near his home in Banstead, Surrey, aged 59. The obituarist in The Times described him as "a valiant champion for the purity of the English language".
