= Bryn Euryn =

Hill and protected area in Clwyd, Wales

Coordinates: 53.30269°N 3.75344°W

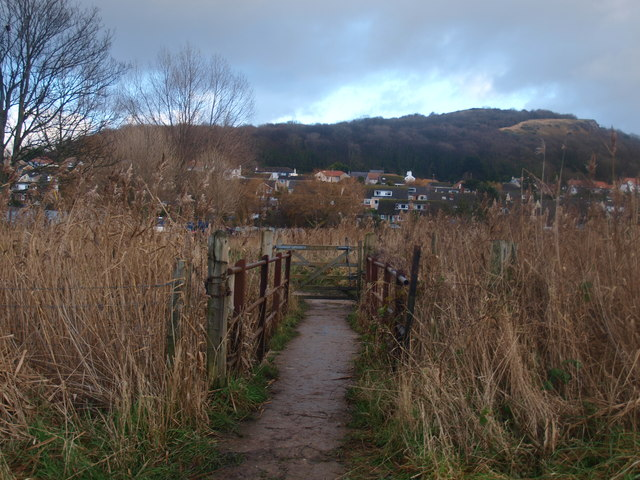
View towards Bryn Euryn

Bryn Euryn (Welsh: [ˈɛirɪn]; /ˈɛərɪn/ AYR-in) is a hill which is a Site of Special Scientific Interest in Conwy County Borough, Wales. There is a trig point at the summit. It lies above the seaside town of Rhos-on-Sea and village of Mochdre, Conwy. It is 131 metres (430 feet) above sea level, and is listed as a HuMP. At the bottom of the hill are the remains of Llys Euryn.

== Dinerth ==
The site commands extensive views of the Conwy Valley and coast, and was once the location of a hillfort, which was initially excavated in the autumn of 1997 for the Gwynedd Archaeological Trust. The excavations revealed a "massive, well-built" wall formed from quarried limestone, believed to have once been 3 m (9.8 ft) high and to have been fronted by 3.5 m (11 ft) of rubble. There were no archaeological discoveries permitting a certain identification, but the pre-Norman layout led David Longley, the study's director, to connect it with the early-6th century king of Rhos Cynlas the Red on the basis of the "Bear Den" (Latin: receptaculi ursi) mentioned in Gildas's passage on him and the surviving local name of the area as Dinerth (Old Welsh: Din Eirth, "Fort Bear").

The hilltop was used again in World War II first as an observation post by the Home Guard; it was then used by the RAF as one of the first radar posts used to detect German bombers heading to Liverpool.

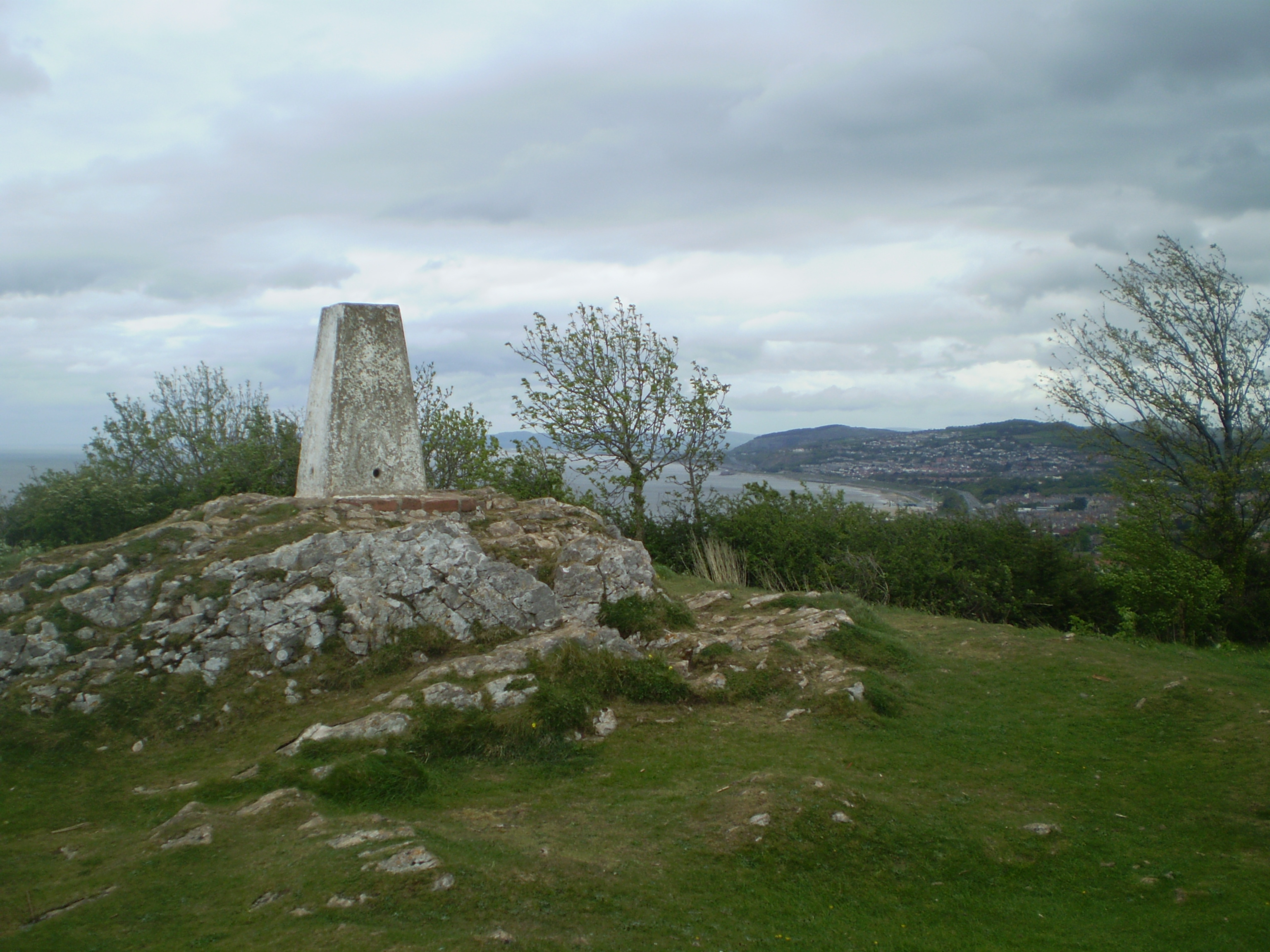
Bryn Euryn summit

== See also ==
- List of Sites of Special Scientific Interest in Clwyd
- List of hillforts in Wales
