= Euryn (given name) =

Welsh male given name

- Pronunciation: Welsh: [ˈɛirɪn] /ˈɛərɪn/ AYR-in
- Gender: Male

Origin
- Origin: Welsh
- Meaning: Gold Trinket/Jewel

Euryn is a masculine given name and place name.

== Origin and meaning ==
Euryn means "gold trinket or jewel" and derives from the Welsh word "Aur" (gold).

== Notable people ==
- Euryn Ogwen Williams (1942–2021), Welsh broadcaster, presenter and writer

== See also ==
- Euryn
