= River Arth =

River in Ceredigion, Wales

Coordinates: 52.249°N 4.225°W

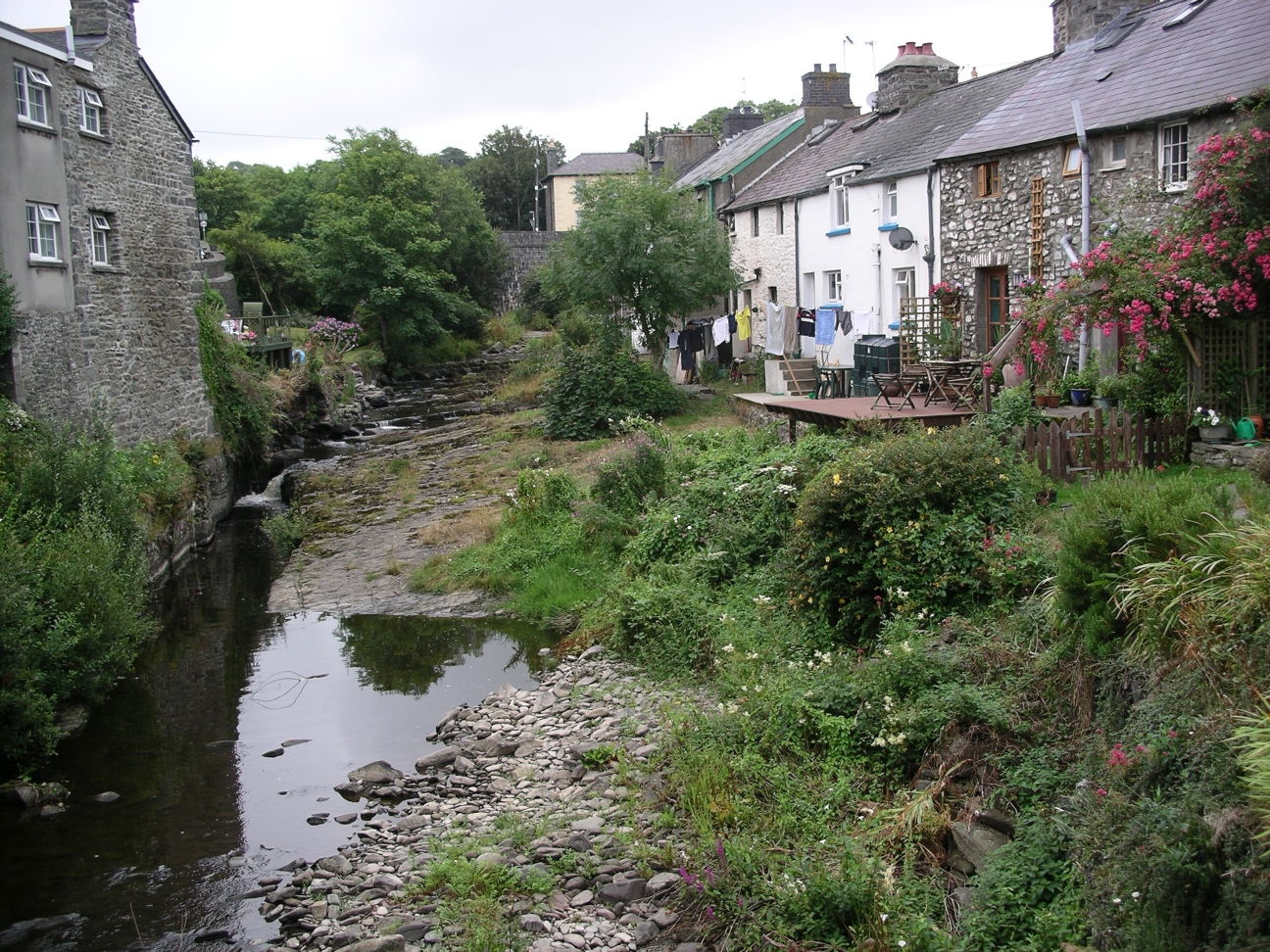
- Arth in Aberarth

Location
- Country: Wales

Physical characteristics
- Source
  - location: hills near Bethania, Ceredigion
- Mouth: Cardigan Bay
  - location: Aberarth
- Length: 15 mi (24 km)

The River Arth is a small river that rises in the hills near Bethania, Ceredigion, Wales, and runs west for 15 miles (24 km) and discharges into Cardigan Bay at Aberarth.

Despite its small size it is one of the few rivers in Britain which has a bore when the incoming tide cause a tidal wave to run upstream. The bore is only a few inches high and it runs only for a short distance upstream; beyond the road bridge in Aberarth the terrain rises steeply, preventing the bore propagating any further.

In the 1970s, the River Arth suffered severe intermittent agricultural pollution from a dairy unit not far from the village but improved pollution control and a change of ownership of the farm rectified that position.
