= Ernest Gowers =

English writer and civil servant (1880–1966)

Sir Ernest Gowers GCB GBE
- Ernest Gowers in 1920
- Born: Ernest Arthur Gowers; 2 June 1880; Marylebone, London, England
- Died: 16 April 1966 (aged 85); Midhurst, Sussex, England
- Education: Rugby School; University of Cambridge
- Occupation: Civil Servant
- Notable work: The Complete Plain Words

Sir Ernest Arthur Gowers (/ˈɡaʊ.ərz/; 2 June 1880 – 16 April 1966) was a British civil servant and author who is best remembered for his book Plain Words, first published in 1948, and his revision of Fowler's classic Modern English Usage. Before making his name as an author, he had a long career in the Civil Service, which he entered in 1903. His final full-time appointment was as Senior Regional Commissioner for Civil Defence, London Region (1940–45). After the Second World War, he was appointed chairman of numerous government inquiries, including the 1949 Royal Commission into Capital Punishment. He was also chairman of the Harlow New Town Development Corporation.

== Early life and education ==
Ernet Arthur Gowers was born in London, the younger son of the neurologist Sir William Gowers and his wife, Mary, (daughter of Frederick Baines, one of the proprietors of the Leeds Mercury). The family lived in Queen Anne Street, W1. Ernest followed his elder brother, William Frederick Gowers (1875–1954), to Rugby School, where he excelled academically and in sport. At Rugby, Ernest was also noted as an outstanding organist, an accomplishment that became a lifelong hobby. Both boys won scholarships to read Classics at Cambridge--(William to Trinity College, Cambridge and Ernest to Clare College, Cambridge). Their sisters, Edith and Evelyn, mainly schooled at home, both lost their sight after developing Retinitis pigmentosa in early adult life.

In 1902 Gowers graduated from Cambridge with a First in the Classical Tripos, and attended Wren's, a civil service crammer in London, to study for the highly competitive Civil Service Examination. In December 1903 he passed the Civil Service Examination. He also sat for the Inner Temple Bar exam, which he passed in 1906.

In 1905 Gowers married Constance Greer, daughter of Thomas Macgregor Greer (member of the Senate of Northern Ireland, and a Deputy-Lieutenant for Co. Antrim). They had two daughters and one son. Gowers's elder brother, William, went to Africa, joined the colonial civil service and rose to become Governor of Uganda (1925–32) and Senior Crown Agent for the Colonies (1932–38).

== Career ==
=== Civil service ===
After passing the Civil Service Examination in December 1903, Gowers embarked on the career that led to the claim that he "may be regarded as one of the greatest public servants of his day."

Gowers entered the home civil service as an upper division clerk in the Department of Inland Revenue. He moved to the India Office in September 1904, and from March 1907 to October 1911, he was private secretary to successive Parliamentary Under-Secretaries for India, most notably Edwin Montagu. In October 1911 he was promoted to HM Treasury as private secretary to the Chancellor of the Exchequer, David Lloyd George, at a time when Lloyd George was introducing his controversial National Insurance Bill. In November 1912 Lloyd George appointed him to the National Health Insurance Commission, as one of a team of promising young civil servants (including John Anderson, Warren Fisher, Arthur Salter, and Claud Schuster) nicknamed the "Loan Collection" as they had been hand-picked from across the civil service. Gowers wrote later, "This gigantic task of bringing the National Health and Unemployment Insurance Acts into operation taught the Service what it could do, and the control of the whole of the social and economic life of the nation during the war drove home the lesson." The members of the loan collection were deployed to other departments during the First World War. While nominally continuing to hold his post, Gowers was attached to the Foreign Office working under Charles Masterman MP at Wellington House, Britain's top-secret wartime propaganda unit.

=== Grappling with the coal industry ===
In 1917 Gowers was appointed secretary of the Conciliation and Arbitration Board for government employees. In 1919 he began a 25-year involvement with the coal industry, joining the Board of Trade as director of production in the mines department. The following year he was promoted to head the department as permanent under-secretary for mines, a position he retained throughout the Miners' Strike. In 1927 he became chairman of the Board of Inland Revenue.

In 1930 Gowers was appointed chair of the newly established Coal Mines Reorganisation Commission, set up under the Coal Mines Act of 1930, in an attempt to improve the efficiency of British coal mines, but deficiencies in the Act soon became evident. The Times commented, "Sir Ernest Gowers and his colleagues struggled manfully with their difficulties, but Parliament had inadvertently tied their hands behind their backs." A new and more powerful body, the Coal Commission, was set up in 1938, with Gowers as chairman. In July 1942 all unmined coal in Britain ceased to be the property of the colliery owners and was vested in the Coal Commission.

=== Senior Regional Commissioner for Civil Defence, London Region ===
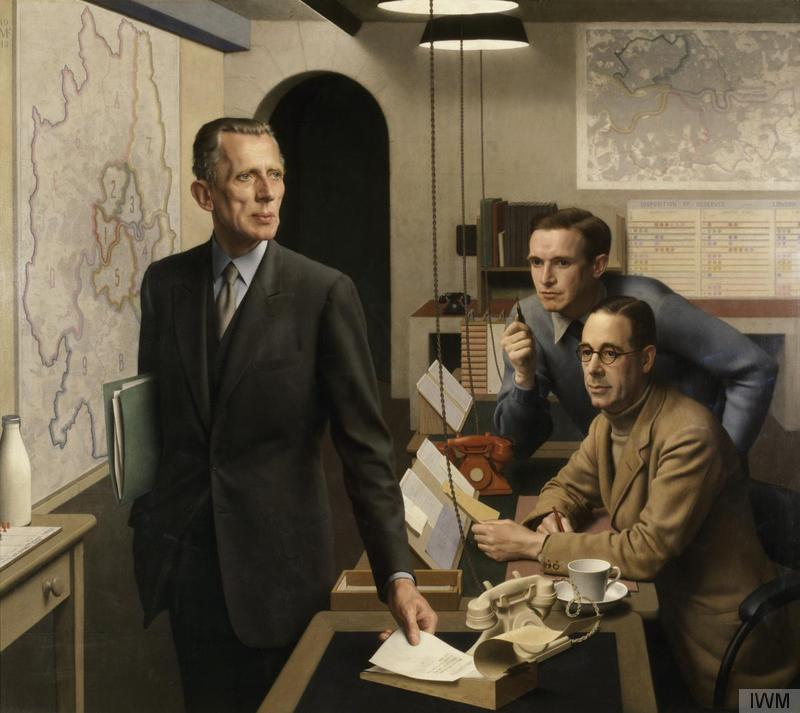
Gowers (left) with Lt Col A J Child, Director of Operations and Intelligence, and K A L Parker, Deputy Chief Administrative Officer, in the London Regional Civil Defence Control Room, 1943, by Meredith Frampton

Throughout the 1930s Gowers and his colleagues had also been involved in preparing for possible war, and invasion. From 1935 onwards he combined his frustrating work with the coal industry with civil defence planning, attached to the Department for the Co-ordination of Defence. John Anderson was given control of civil defence planning in 1938 and set up a network of civil defence regions. Euan Wallace MP was appointed head of London Region, but ill-health forced him to retire in 1940. Gowers, his deputy, became Senior Regional Commissioner for Civil Defence in London, running civil defence through the Blitz from a concrete bunker underneath the Natural History Museum, with Harold Scott and Edward "Teddy" Evans as his deputies.

The prime minister, Winston Churchill, told Gowers, "If communication with the Government becomes very difficult or impossible, it may be necessary for you to act on behalf of the Government … without consultation with ministers." Churchill promised that in such an event Gowers would have the Government's backing. In a biographical sketch of Gowers, his great-granddaughter Rebecca Gowers comments that this potentially gave him direct responsibility for governing seven million people, though at the time he wrote of himself as "but a transient and embarrassed phantom flitting across the stage of history." The Times wrote of Gowers, "In this post he showed his full powers as an administrator, and indeed as a leader. Energetic, forceful, always cheerful, with an unfailing eye for the essential, he gave the impression of being master of every unexpected development and, as a result, infused confidence into all who came in contact with him." His wife became a member of the Women's Voluntary Service and ran the Gordon Services Club, a hostel for soldiers on leave in London.

=== Post-war reconstruction ===
After the war Gowers was appointed chairman of the Harlow New Town Development Corporation, one of several new towns being built to provide housing for people displaced by wartime bombing, but he fell foul of the bureaucracy in the Ministry for Town and Country Planning and his three-year contract was not renewed. He was told that he was too old. This did not prevent his being invited to chair a series of committees of inquiry on Women in the Foreign Service (1945); Closing Hours of Shops (1946); Houses of Outstanding Historic or Architectural Interest (1948); and Foot-and-mouth Disease (1952).

In 1949 Gowers was appointed chairman of the Royal Commission on Capital Punishment (1949–53), set up by the Attlee government in an attempt to defuse the long-term political debate over capital punishment, but the terms of reference did not include provision for recommending its abolition. He was profoundly affected by the evidence presented to the commission and said later that what he learned as chairman of the commission converted him from vague support of capital punishment to strong opposition. As a result, he wrote A Life for a Life? The Problem of Capital Punishment (1956), of which H L A Hart wrote, "Certainly the publication of this report in England introduced altogether new standards of clarity and relevance into discussions of a subject which had too often been obscured by ignorance and prejudice." The political debate dragged on and it was not until 1965 that capital punishment was effectively abolished in England.

=== Plain Words and Modern English Usage ===
Gowers first went into print on the subject of bureaucratic English usage, in 1929. in an article entitled "Mainly About the King's English", and he continued this crusade throughout his career. After the Second World War, Sir Edward Bridges, head of the home civil service, invited him to write a pamphlet on English usage for use in civil service training courses.

The books on "plain words" show his regard for brevity and precision as the leading virtues in factual writing. Throughout his life he crusaded against the faults which have made "officialese" a term of opprobrium and in favour of simple and direct English.

— Robert Burchfield on Gowers and Plain Words.

The resulting Plain Words, a work 94 pages long, became an instant success, not only within the civil service but internationally. It was published in April 1948 and by Christmas of that year, it was in its eighth impression, with more than 150,000 copies sold. It was followed by the ABC of Plain Words (1951), and the two books were combined in 1954 and published by Her Majesty's Stationery Office as The Complete Plain Words. This was revised in 1973 by Sir Bruce Fraser, and then in 1986 by Sidney Greenbaum and Janet Whitcut. In March 2014, a new revision, by Gowers's great-granddaughter Rebecca Gowers, was published by Penguin Books.

In 1956, at the age of 76, Gowers accepted a commission from the Oxford University Press to undertake the first revision of H W Fowler's Modern English Usage, which had been in print since 1926 with only very minor changes. It took Gowers nine years to complete the task. In 1996, Gowers' edition was succeeded by a more radical revision, edited by Robert Burchfield.

=== Honours and awards ===
Gowers was appointed CB in the 1917 Birthday Honours, Chevalier of the Order of the Crown of Belgium in 1918, KBE in the 1926 Birthday Honours, KCB in the 1928 Birthday Honours, GBE in the 1945 Birthday Honours, and GCB in the 1953 New Year Honours. He was Gentleman Usher of the Purple Rod of the Order of the British Empire, 1952–60. He was a Freeman of Royal Borough of the Kingston-on-Thames.

Gowers received an honorary doctorate from Manchester University, was an honorary fellow of Clare College, Cambridge, and an honorary Associate of the Royal Institute of British Architects, and was elected president of the English Association (1956–57).

== Later life and death ==
Gowers bought a house in Sussex in the 1930s and lived there permanently after the war, writing books and managing a small farm. He became chairman of the board of the hospital where his father had worked, the National Hospital for Nervous Diseases (now the National Hospital for Neurology and Neurosurgery), Queen Square, London, and was on the board of Le Court Cheshire Home near Petersfield.

Gowers died in April 1966, at King Edward VII Hospital, Midhurst, Sussex, age 85, nine months after his revision of Fowler's Modern English Usage was published.

== Personal life ==
Ernest Gowers and Constance (Kit) had three children and six grandchildren, for whom they always offered an open house in the school holidays. When Kit died in 1952, one of their daughters, the oboist Peggy Shiffner, gave up her career and moved in to look after him, also working as a volunteer at Le Court.

The composer Patrick Gowers was his grandson, and the mathematician Sir Timothy Gowers is his great-grandson.

== Works ==
=== Books ===
- Plain Words: A Guide to the Use of English. London: His Majesty's Stationery Office. 1948. OCLC 2602739.
- ABC of Plain Words. London: His Majesty's Stationery Office. 1951. OCLC 65646838.
- The Complete Plain Words. London: Her Majesty's Stationery Office. 1954. OCLC 559778291.
- A Life for a Life? The Problem of Capital Punishment. London: Chatto and Windus. 1956. OCLC 1241240.
- H.W. Fowler: The Man and his Teaching. London: English Association. 1957. OCLC 3078213.
- Medical Jargon: The Osler Oration, 1958. London: Practitioner Ltd. 1958. OCLC 32987909.
- H.W. Fowler: A Dictionary of Modern English Usage (second edition). Oxford: Oxford University Press. 1965. OCLC 334209140.

=== Official reports ===
- Coal Mines Reorganisation Commission: Report to the Secretary for Mines. London: His Majesty's Stationery Office. 1933. OCLC 17858091.
- Closing Hours of Shops: Report by a Committee of Enquiry. London: His Majesty's Stationery Office. 1947. OCLC 39021698.
- Health, Welfare, and Safety in Non-Industrial Employment Hours of Employment of Juveniles: Report by a Committee of Enquiry. London: His Majesty's Stationery Office. 1947. OCLC 558981410.
- Report of the Committee on Houses of Outstanding Historic or Architectural Interest. London: His Majesty's Stationery Office. 1950. OCLC 29416569.
- Royal Commission on Capital Punishment, 1949–1953: Report. London: Her Majesty's Stationery Office. 1953. OCLC 65416058.

Government offices
Preceded by Sir Richard Hopkins	Chairman, Board of Inland Revenue; 1927–1930	Succeeded by Sir James Grigg
