= List of Cross Game episodes =

Cover of the Japanese DVD release of Cross Game volume 1, showing Ko (left) and Aoba

Cross Game is an anime television series based on the manga series of the same name written and illustrated by Mitsuru Adachi and published by Shogakukan. The series is about the high school baseball players Ko Kitamura and Aoba Tsukishima and their attempts to fulfill the dream of Aoba's dead sister, Wakaba, of seeing them play in the national high school championship tournament in Koshien Stadium.

The anime adaptation is produced by SynergySP and directed by Osamu Sekita, with character designs by Yuuji Kondō and music by Kotaro Nakagawa. The series began broadcasting on the TV Tokyo network on 5 April 2009 in the 10:00–10:30 am slot; episodes began syndication later in April 2009 on AT-X and other channels in Japan, and finished airing with episode 50 on 28 March 2010. The first DVD volume of episodes 1–3 was released in Japan on 24 July 2009, with additional DVDs released monthly. Viz Media began streaming subtitled episodes of the Cross Game anime in North America in May 2010.

Six pieces of theme music were used in the series. "Summer Rain", written by Kentarō Kobuchi and sung by Kobukuro, was used as the opening theme song for all episodes. It was released by Lantis on 15 April 2009 in both regular and limited edition versions, and reached #2 on the Oricon singles chart. "Heartfelt Dream" (恋焦がれて見た夢, Koi Kogarete Mita Yume), composed and sung by Ayaka and arranged by Shintarō Tokita., was the ending theme song for episodes 1–13. It was released as a single by Lantis in both regular and limited edition versions on 22 April 2009, and reached #6 on the Oricon singles chart. "Orange Days" (オレンジDays, Orenji Deizu), written and performed by Squarehood, was the ending theme for episodes 14–26. It was released as a single by Warner Music Japan on 5 August 2009. "Moeru yō na Koi ja Nai kedo" (燃えるような恋じゃないけど), by Tsuru, was the ending theme song for episodes 27–39. It was released as a single by Warner Music Japan on 11 November 2009. "Rehearsal" (リハーサル, "Rihāsaru"), by Natsuko Kondo, was the ending theme song for episodes 40–49. It was released by 725 RECORDS on Kondo's album Kondomania 4 (コンドウマニア 4, Kondōmania 4) on 11 November 2009. "Loving Maiden" (恋スル乙女, Koisuru Otome), also by Kondo, was the ending theme song for episode 50.

== List of episodes ==
No.	Title	Original release date
1	"Four-Leaf Clover"; Transliteration: "Yotsuba no Kurōbā" (Japanese: 四つ葉のクローバー)	5 April 2009
Fifth-grader Ko Kitamura was born on the same day in the same hospital as his neighbor, Wakaba Tsukishima, who treats him as her boyfriend as a result. One day during summer vacation, she makes him take her to swimming lessons on his bicycle. On the way back, to avoid classmate Osamu Akaishi, who has a crush on Wakaba, Ko joins a sandlot baseball game organized by another classmate, Daiki Nakanishi. Because he has never played before, Ko fields badly, but because he has practiced in the Tsukishima family's batting cages he hits the game-winning home run. After their joint 11th birthday, Wakaba gives Ko a schedule of birthday presents for him to give her through age 20. Soon after this, Wakaba drowns while saving a younger girl at an overnight swimming camp. Ko does not know how to respond to this until, the evening after her funeral, he sees Akaishi weeping outside Wakaba's house and realizes he just needs to cry. The closing credits show time passing and by the end, Ko and Wakaba's younger sister Aoba Tsukishima are in junior high school.
2	"I Hate You!"; Transliteration: "Daikkirai!" (Japanese: 大っ嫌い!)	12 April 2009
Four years later, in the fall of her second year at Seishu Junior High School, Aoba is a pitcher for the baseball team, and still hates Ko for having monopolized her dead sister's time. Starting pitcher Keiichiro Senda, who considers himself popular, asks her out on a date without waiting for a response. When she does not show up, Senda goes to her house but is frightened off by the family cat. When Ko (in his third year at Seishu Junior High) delivers baseballs to the Tsukishima batting cages, he hits four home runs, which annoys Aoba, especially since she cannot match it. In a flashback, she remembers Wakaba telling her about Ko's potential to one day pitch 100-mile-per-hour (160 km/h) fastballs, which Aoba claimed was her ideal in a man, but that if he does, Aoba cannot take him from her. Meanwhile, inspired by Aoba's pitching, Ko has been obeying Wakaba's order to follow Aoba's workout routine.
3	"For Real?"; Transliteration: "Chanto?" (Japanese: ちゃんと?)	19 April 2009
Nakanishi recruits Ko for a rematch of the sandlot game from fifth grade. When Ko warms up with what he calls a few soft pitches, Nakanishi has him play right fielder instead, claiming he wants a friendly game. Meanwhile, when Aoba plays catch with her little sister, Momiji, she is startled to learn that Momiji can handle her hardest throws because Momiji has helped Ko practice. Akaishi, now captain of the junior high school baseball team, watches the sandlot game and is reminded of Wakaba's boasts about Ko's abilities. With Ko's fielding and batting, his team wins in a close game. Afterward Nakanishi learns that Ko did not join the baseball team, despite his surprisingly fast fastball, because Nakanishi had been kicked off it for fighting. During practice, Aoba and Akaishi discuss unsettling rumors about the Seishu High School baseball team, which has had a second straight losing year. In his office at Seishu High School, Acting Principal Shido tells a man dressed as a coach that he is pleased with his plans.
4	"Secret Weapon"; Transliteration: "Himitsu Heiki" (Japanese: 秘密兵器)	26 April 2009
On the way to school one morning, Aoba and Ko foil a burglary they glimpse from the train by hitting the burglar with a baseball, but Senda gets credit for it. Akaishi does not believe Senda foiled the robbery, and learns from Aoba that she threw a ball that Ko had been carrying, and then from Nakanishi that he and Ko have been training in secret. Akaishi takes over Ko's training on the condition that Nakanishi return to the baseball team. At the Tsukishima batting cages, an unknown boy breaks Ko's home run record but complains about how slow the pitching machines are. The boy later appears at Seishu High School, being given a tour for prospective baseball players. Senda visits Aoba while she is working in the Clover Cafe attached to the batting cages and asks about Ko's secret training, but she denies any knowledge about random neighbors. As Ko practices pitching with Akaishi as catcher, the latter describes the dream Wakaba had the night before she left for swimming camp, in which Ko and Akaishi are a playing as a battery in the national high school baseball tournament at Koshien.
5	"Can I Borrow a Pot?"; Transliteration: "Nabe Kashitekureru?" (Japanese: ナベ貸してくれる?)	3 May 2009
On New Year's Eve, Aoba's father and oldest sister, Ichiyo, visit her sick grandmother, leaving Aoba to care for Momiji, who is down with a cold. When Ko visits, he brings the ingredients for rice porridge. When Momiji's fever spikes, Ko helps Aoba tend her until the fever breaks after a few hours. Unlike Aoba, Ko is a decent cook, and his porridge tastes just the way Wakaba prepared it for Aoba. After Momiji tells Aoba about a time Ko played with her when no one else would, Aoba tells Ko that she will never be a good sister like Wakaba, then gets mad when he tells her she is not that worthless. Ko cooks New Year soba for Momiji and himself, but Aoba makes her own instant noodles. Ko stays the night to watch Momiji and after the three fall asleep while watching television, Aoba snuggles up to him, thinking he is Wakaba. The next morning, before Aoba wakes up, Momiji tells Ko they looked comfortable sleeping together. Ko leaves to practice pitching with Akaishi and Nakanishi, and in a montage, the main cast is shown training as time passes, ending with spring.
6	"Who Are You?"; Transliteration: "Dare Da? Omae" (Japanese: 誰だ?おまえ)	10 May 2009
Ko enters Seishu High School and joins the baseball club along with Akaishi and Nakanishi, where they are put on the second-string "prefab" team (so-called because it is housed in a prefab hut) headed by former Head Coach Maeno. Most of the varsity team are ringers recruited by new Head Coach Daimon from around the country, including power hitter Yuhei Azuma, the boy from the batting center, and Daimon promises Shido that he will take the school to the national spotlight of Koshien within three years. When Aoba, now captain of the junior high school team, visits a high school team practice, she is surprised to see Ko playing baseball, and he tells her he was inspired by her pitching. In class, Azuma does not recognize Senda (who is on the varsity team) but does remember Ko from the batting center. Azuma tells Daimon that he only remembers faces of significant people, of which there are four on the team. One day as the prefab team practices on the junior high field, out of sight from the varsity players, Maeno has Ko pitch at full strength once and Aoba realizes Ko is Akaishi's "secret weapon" for getting off the prefab team.
7	"Sucker for a Pretty Face"; Transliteration: "Menkui Nan Desu" (Japanese: 面食いなんです)	17 May 2009
Akaishi tells Ko and Nakanishi about Daimon's career as a coach who cares more about results than his players, and suggests they drive him out. Daimon tells Azuma that he picked Senda for the varsity team to be a pitcher who can be used up during practice, then recruits Aoba as another disposable practice pitcher. When Ko, Akaishi, and Nakanishi watch her pitch, Daimon tells them it does not matter if she pitches too much because, as a girl, she cannot play in a tournament game. When Azuma takes his turn at bat, he asks her to not hold back, and in response she insists that Akaishi be her catcher. Pitching her fastest, she almost strikes out Azuma. After Akaishi accuses Azuma of not being manly for deliberately fouling back, Azuma hits a home run on the next pitch and Aoba collapses exhausted. Afterward, Aoba tells Ko that despite her sore arm she will continue pitching for the varsity team to learn their batting weaknesses, and that she wants to believe Wakaba's claims about him.
8	"You Two Are Alike"; Transliteration: "Niteru n'Da" (Japanese: 似てるんだ)	24 May 2009
When Akaishi meets Momiji, he is startled by her resemblance to Wakaba, who died at the age Momiji is now. Ichiyo reminds Aoba that she resented how Ko monopolized Wakaba's time, and both Ichiyo and Akaishi tell Aoba that she and Ko are alike in their competitiveness. In the park, Momiji plays catch with an old man who is a regular at Akaishi's family's liquor store. Daimon tells Shido that an upcoming scrimmage between varsity and prefab teams will demonstrate how much better the varsity players are. Because of a rumor that prefab players who perform well might be promoted to varsity, the third-year players train hard. Before the scrimmage, Ko has Aoba catch his pitches because he has never played in a real game and so has no comparison for his pitching. She calls them okay, which pleases him as the best compliment he can expect from her, and makes a bet that he will hold the varsity team to ten runs, which she changes to five runs after looking at her bruised hand. When Aoba arrives at the scrimmage, Momiji's old man tells her Shido has ordered the audience to sit and cheer only on the varsity side of the field.
9	"Let's Do This!"; Transliteration: "Shimatte Ikō" (Japanese: しまって行こー)	31 May 2009
As the scrimmage starts, Daimon tells Shido he is using Senda as starting pitcher to test his team's fielding. In the top of the first inning, the prefab team is quickly retired. In the bottom of the inning, Ko quickly pitches out the first three batters, which Daimon attributes to luck but Azuma recognizes is based on Aoba's batting data and Ko's ability. After Senda gives up three runs in the top of the second inning, including home runs by Ko and Akaishi, Daimon kicks him off the varsity team and Maeno substitutes him in as shortstop for the prefab team. Ko pitches fastballs down the middle to Azuma, which Aoba calls foolish and Azuma hits for a home run. The prefab team quickly retires the rest of the side but has trouble hitting against the best varsity pitcher. After Daimon chews out his players for failing to hit against "small fry," they manage only one run in the third inning. At the end of three innings with the prefab team ahead 3 to 2, Ko complains of being tired.
10	"Yeah, Right"; Transliteration: "Jōdan wa Yose" (Japanese: 冗談はよせ)	7 June 2009
At the top of the fourth, Ko hits a triple but fails to score. In the bottom of the inning, Azuma hits a two-run homer to give the varsity team the lead. The prefab team players in their third year tell their teammates that winning does not matter, only playing well enough to get promoted back to varsity. Daimon chews out center fielder Miki for strategically bunting against his orders to treat the scrimmage as a batting practice. At the bottom of the sixth, a tiring Ko tells catcher Akaishi that he can no longer pitch with both speed and control, and Akaishi has him go for speed. After Azuma hits another home run, Akaishi tells him the pitch was weak because this is Ko's first real game. When a third-year prefab player, Makihara, is thrown out while running for home, Senda tells him Daimon has no intention of promoting anyone to the varsity team because that would mean admitting he was wrong. In the bottom of the seventh, Miki notices that if Ko had intentionally walked Azuma, the varsity team would be losing 1 to 3 instead of winning 5 to 3.
11	"Wipe That Smirk Off Your Face"; Transliteration: "Niyaniya Suru na" (Japanese: ニヤニヤするな)	14 June 2009
Knowing they will not be promoted, Maeno's third-year players stop playing hard, but after the prefab team manager, Hiroko "Tubby" Ōkubo, tells Makihara that Daimon injured Maeno's head as the latter pleaded to give a third-year player a spot, Makihara plays with renewed effort. At the end of eight innings, Ko notices that if the score remains 5 to 3, he will win his bet with Aoba. In the top of the ninth, the prefab team gets runners on first and second and Makihara advances them with a sacrifice bunt. Ko hits both runners in with a single to tie the game. While Ko is on base, Azuma criticizes his pitching, to which Ko says he did not expect Azuma could hit him. In the bottom of the ninth with a runner on first, Azuma comes to bat and deliberately fouls out twice before being struck out by Ko. On the bench, Azuma silently tells Ko to stop smirking, and the next batter hits in the runner to win the game. Afterward, Ko visits Wakaba's grave to tell her about his debut, only to find Aoba had been there first.
12	"I Challenge You!"; Transliteration: "Shōbu Shinasai!" (Japanese: 勝負しなさい！)	21 June 2009
Aoba's teammates ask her out on dates conditional on their performance during a game, but she criticizes their goals as too low. Even with Aoba not pitching her hardest, Seishu Junior High wins in a called game. Afterward Senda meets his cousin, Midori Koganezawa, who is annoyed he ditched practicing with her to watch Aoba's game. Midori challenges Aoba as a batter, but Aoba declines to pitch to her. At the Tsukishima batting cages, Ko tells Midori the pitching machines are not as fast as Aoba's pitches. Ko helps Risa Shido, the spoiled varsity team manager, go shopping and brings her to the Clover Cafe, where he asks Aoba to put the bill on his tab as a birthday favor. Aoba finally agrees to pitch against Midori and strikes her out; she tells Midori she plans to attend Seishu High School, even though she would not be able play in tournament games, instead of a school with a girls' baseball team. Aoba learns from friends that Ko was being Risa's servant for a day in return for the last available teapot that is the 16th birthday gift on Wakaba's schedule of presents.
13	"Summer Training Camp?"; Transliteration: "Natsugasshuku?" (Japanese: 夏合宿?)	28 June 2009
Ko, Akaishi, and Nakanishi watch Seishu's varsity team crush an opponent in the prefectural summer baseball tournament and realize they did very well against them. During one game, Miki shifts position against Daimon's orders to make a game-winning play. Banned from using the school's field by Daimon, Maeno takes the prefab team on a secret intensive training camp in the mountains. Ko forgets his suitcase, and when Aoba takes it to him she gets lost following his father's bad instructions. While waiting for Aoba at the bus stop, Senda complains about how strict Maeno has become and Ko says he prefers to keep busy in the summer. After a thunderstorm, they search for Aoba and find her shoe near a swollen stream similar to the one Wakaba drowned in, before finally finding her at a woodcutter's house. In Seishu's next game, Daimon takes Miki out of the lineup for ignoring his orders. Aoba spends the night at camp, and in the morning Maeno tells her the team is training hard to keep up with Ko because they have become fans of him. As she leaves on the bus, Aoba whispers to herself, "prefabs, fight."
14	"How Many Points?"; Transliteration: "Nanten?" (Japanese: 何点?)	5 July 2009
At the prefab team's training camp, Akaishi and Maeno note that their outfield's defense has been weakened by the retirement of the third-year students. Without Miki in the lineup, Seishu loses in the round of 16. After the game, Aoba helps a Seishu fan by hitting a thief with a baseball and learns the fan is Junpei Azuma, Yuhei Azuma's older brother. Junpei gives her a ride home, where he is immediately taken with Ichiyo and becomes a regular suitor. When Aoba goes to the swimming pool, Ichiyo asks Ko to take Aoba her forgotten change of clothes in return for Aoba's bringing his suitcase to camp. At the pool, Ko meets some boys who asked Aoba out but were turned down, including Senda and a boxer who despairs because Ko and Aoba argue familiarly. Ko and Aoba are reminded of visiting the pool with Wakaba, and when he asks Aoba what her sister saw in him, she says she wants to know too.
15	"Enjoy It More"; Transliteration: "Motto Tanoshime yo" (Japanese: もっと楽しめよ)	12 July 2009
Shido tells Daimon that the prefab team has been playing practice games without permission, losing all five times. After a sixth loss, Azuma learns from Tubby who the opponents were. Shido orders the prefab team be disbanded. However, Maeno proposes to instead hold a rematch scrimmage with the losing team's coach losing his job, and Daimon agrees in order to settle things once and for all. When Momiji's mysterious old man visits a prefab team practice, Tubby introduces him as her grandfather. Yuhei Azuma tells his older brother he will get to Koshien for certain, to which Junpei says to have fun with baseball. Because of his differences with Daimon, Miki transfers to another school. The prefab team recruits Aoba for the scrimmage to replace a retired third-year player, and to convince her to play center field instead of pitcher, Akaishi has her bat against Ko. After watching the prefab team practice, Azuma deliberately injures himself to avoid playing in the scrimmage and tells Daimon to prove that he has enough other good players to take him to Koshien.
16	"How Should I Know?"; Transliteration: "Shiru ka" (Japanese: 知るか)	19 July 2009
Before the scrimmage Daimon tells Azuma that Shido will not fire him even if the varsity team loses, and Shido confirms this. However, during the first inning, Tubby's grandfather, who is the school's chairman, tells Shido and Daimon he is ratifying the wager with Maeno. During the first two innings, Ko allows the bases to get loaded before striking out the next three batters, and to focus him, Akaishi tells Ko to pitch as if it were late in the game. In the sixth inning, the game still scoreless, Daimon asks Azuma who were the prefab team's opponents in their practice matches; Azuma says they played top teams from the prefectural tournament, and that Ko pitched easily the first six innings to give his team fielding practice. In the seventh inning, Aoba hits a single and then scores on Senda's sacrifice fly. During the final innings, Azuma asks Daimon if he wishes he had better hitters in his lineup, such as Miki, and as Ko strikes out the final three batters, Azuma says Ko is now the best pitcher they have played against all year. As the prefab team celebrates their win, Aoba silently tells Wakaba that Ko did it.
17	"That's Tough"; Transliteration: "Shindoi na" (Japanese: シンドイな)	26 July 2009
After the scrimmage, Shido and Daimon are fired and most of Daimon's varsity players follow him to another school. Yuhei Azuma stays and begins living with the Kitamuras because the baseball dorm is closed down. Because Ko's stamina flags during the fall prefectural tournament, Azuma makes Ko begin jogging to school instead of taking the train. A boy asks Ko for an introduction to Aoba, and Ko congratulates him as the 100th person to do so. When Azuma asks Ko about a photograph of Wakaba, Ko admits that he was in love with her, and Azuma responds that "you guys" have it tough. To get the five most persistent boys to stop asking her out, Aoba goes on a date with all five at once. When Junpei asks about his pitching form, Ko is surprised but says that he based it on Aoba's. Aoba explains to Ko that Junpei's promising career as a pitcher was ended by an injury before he could go to Koshien, and that Yuhei is trying to reach Koshien in his place. Ko tells Aoba he is also serious about going to Koshien, to make Wakaba's last dream come true.
18	"An Audition?"; Transliteration: "Ōdishon?" (Japanese: オーディション?)	2 August 2009
Aoba's friends urge her to audition for the lead in a movie adaptation of Idol Ace, but she declines. Risa auditions and when she is picked as a finalist, she makes Ko try to teach her to pitch convincingly. Midori tries again to recruit Aoba for her school's girls' baseball team. When Aoba declines a batting rematch, Midori shows off her hitting in the Tsukishima cages, where she meets Risa practicing batting and coaches her. With continual practice Risa's pitching improves but, as Azuma puts it, only from kindergarten to first-grade level. After a week of Midori's pleading, Aoba agrees to pitch to her again. At the school baseball field, they meet Risa practicing at the last minute. Aoba strikes Midori out in three pitches, and after watching her form, Risa pitches a ball over the plate for the first time. Risa gets the role of a spoiled team manager and resigns as Seishu's manager. Risa gives Aoba a gift in thanks, and says she's okay with a supporting role if it leads her to her goal of becoming famous.
19	"Memories ..."; Transliteration: "Omoide no ..." (Japanese: 思い出の・・・)	9 August 2009
For the first time since Wakaba's death, Ko goes with the Tsukishimas to visit to the sisters' maternal grandparents in the mountains, where they are caught in a snowstorm. While trapped in the house, he and Aoba remember his past visits and playing with Wakaba. Looking through a photo album, Ko recognizes Aoba's uncle, a famous mountain climber, but not his son, Mizuki, who is the same age as Aoba. In the morning, Ko goes into the snowy forest to visit the tree on which he and Wakaba carved their names, which Aoba had then scratched out. He gets lost and Aoba directs him to the tree, where he discovers that Aoba had later carved replacement names. Back home, at the start of spring, Ko and Nakanishi see a strange boy climb up a drain spout to retrieve a woman's hat blown there by the wind. When Ko later visits the batting center, he learns the boy is Mizuki, who is moving in with the Tsukishimas.
20	"Mizuki Asami"; Transliteration: "Asami Mizuki" (Japanese: 朝見水輝)	16 August 2009
At the start of the school year, Aoba and Mizuki enter Seishu High School, where Mizuki quickly becomes popular with girls, to Senda's annoyance. Aoba joins the baseball team as a pitcher, which pleases Akaishi and Maeno as the rest of the team will try hard to not lose to a girl. When Mizuki and Aoba reminisce about Wakaba, he tells her that Aoba is the one he loves. Mizuki belatedly recognizes Ko as Wakaba's boyfriend and wonders whether he throws a 100 mph fastball yet. Momiji asks Aoba if she finds Mizuki attractive but she does not answer, and later Momiji remembers Ko and Wakaba playing with her and silently apologises to Wakaba. Several girls ask Mizuki out. He turns them down, claiming to be in love with Aoba, and tells some irate boys that the rumor that Aoba and Ko are going out is false. At practice, Ko tells Akaishi that Aoba is hiding a twisted ankle no one had noticed, and Aoba retaliates by revealing Ko is hiding a stiff left arm. As Mizuki helps Aoba walk home, he tells her he is serious about her.
21	"No Matter What Happens"; Transliteration: "Nani wa Tomoare" (Japanese: 何はともあれ)	23 August 2009
Fliers are posted around school describing Mizuki and Aoba as a couple, and when Ko tears one down, Mizuki tapes it back up. After Ko finishes a meal prepared by Aoba at the Clover Cafe, Ichiyo tells him Aoba tried hard to cook it well because it was for him. Ko tells Ichiyo that he turned down a girl Aoba introduced to him, to which Ichiyo says Wakaba would not mind if he dated someone else, then admits she is more serious about Junpei than any previous boyfriend. For Seishu's first practice game of the season, Aoba is the starting pitcher. When Ko relieves her, Akaishi tells him not to throw too hard just to compete. Ichiyo watches Aoba and Ko squabble in the dugout and comments on their similarity. After Seishu wins, Mizuki fulfills his promise to take Aoba to a movie, though she refuses to call it a date. As they return home, they meet Ko and Aoba squabbles with him again, after which Mizuki comments the encounter cheered her up.
22	"You Underestimated It, Didn't You?"; Transliteration: "Nameteta Desho" (Japanese: なめてたでしょ)	30 August 2009
Before the prefectural summer tournament begins, Aoba teaches Ko how to throw a slider. Midori asks Aoba to pitch for her high school team in a practice game against Oka University, the current national champions in women's baseball. Aoba refuses, claiming Seishu as a prior commitment. At practice, Aoba overhears some younger Seishu players say her pitches are hard to bat because they want to avoid hitting a girl with the ball. That night, she remembers Wakaba telling her she will pitch at Koshien. After Meano turns down an invitation to play Oka, Aoba watches Oka defeat another high school boys' team and agrees to play for Midori's team, Satomi Girls' School. However, the Satomi catcher and team captain, Matsuyama, does not allow Aoba to start as pitcher. In the first inning, the Satomi center fielder is injured and Aoba substitutes for her. When Aoba makes a play for the final out of the inning, she is welcomed by the other team members. At the end of the first, Oka leads 3 to 0.
23	"We'll Make a Comeback, Right?"; Transliteration: "Gyakuten Suru yo ne?" (Japanese: 逆転するよね?)	6 September 2009
After giving up a fourth run in the second inning, the Satomi pitcher, Kojima, asks to switch positions with Aoba. The Oka players are startled by Aoba's 80 mph fastball, at the upper range for female pitchers, and she strikes out their best batter, Ozaki, all of which annoys Oka's pitcher, Sawaguchi. In the fourth inning, Aoba bats in two runners with a double. After Ozaki figures out Matsuyama's call patterns and Oka scores a fifth run, Aoba asks to give the signals instead. In the sixth inning, Aoba scores when the irritated Sawaguchi makes an error, and then Satomi scores a second run. In the last inning, with two outs and runners on first and second, Aoba bats but is caught out by Ozaki. Oka wins 5 to 4. After the game, the Oka coach asks Aoba to try out for the women's national team in the spring, and the Satomi team captain thanks her for pitching. When Aoba returns to practice with Seishu, she repeatedly strikes out the players who wanted to avoid hitting her, and Akaishi says they still need her.
24	"Don't You Quit"; Transliteration: "Yameru na yo" (Japanese: やめるなよ)	13 September 2009
Ko, Akaishi, Azuma, and Nakanishi scout a practice game of Ryuo Academy, who is favored to win the prefectural tournament, and while there meet a former varsity teammate who transferred to Ryuo. Ko is impressed by a Ryuo batter who is not a regular starter, Mishima, whom Azuma remembers from a single meeting. Azuma talks with Miki, who is also scouting Ryuo for another school, and they tell each other they do not regret their choices, leaving and staying at Seishu. For Wakaba's 17th birthday, Ko buys the scheduled present of a shiny pendent. When the tournament schedule is announced, Ryuo is seeded first and Seishu is bracketed to play them in their third game. Seishu's first game of the tournament is called in the fifth inning. Afterward, Ko catches pitches for Aoba, who was for the first time not allowed to play because she is a girl, and when it gets dark, he tells her not to give up on baseball.
25	"It's an Honor"; Transliteration: "Kōei Desu ne" (Japanese: 光栄ですね)	20 September 2009
Ryuo's coach apologizes to Mishima for benching him during the tournament because his star batter, Shimano, insists on keeping attention on himself while being scouted by pro teams. A scout for Seishu's next opponent, Sanno, overhears Akaishi and Nakahara discuss their own team's weaknesses during practice. While studying Shimano's batting, Ko thanks Azuma because no batter can surprise him now. During practice, another Sanno scout overhears Aoba tease Ko about his weak fielding of bunts. The evening before the game, Ko remembers Wakaba telling him that all he has to do to get Aoba to like him is pitch 100 mph. The next day, during the first two innings against Sanno, Seishu has trouble handling Sanno's bunting, however, with Ko's fielding, they hold Sanno to only one run. During the bottom of the second, Akaishi tells Ko to stop practicing fielding, and he begins pitching with his full power. Sanno's coach admits their data about Ko may be faulty, but tells his players that with their current strategy they still have the advantage.
26	"I Know"; Transliteration: "Shitte 'ru yo" (Japanese: 知ってるよ)	27 September 2009
At the end of the fifth inning, after three batters fail to bunt against Ko, Sanno's coach describes Ko's pitching as the sort seen only once every ten years. When Seishu starts scoring in the sixth, Maeno attributes this to Seishu's players being too inexperienced to have consistent weaknesses or strengths. Meanwhile, at Ryuo, Mishima tells two classmates he does not mind staying away when reporters interview Shimano because he himself will ultimately have a better career. After Seishu wins 8 to 1, newspaper coverage highlights Ko's 93-mile-per-hour (150 km/h) fastball. When Mizuki comments that this was not Aoba's ideal of 100 mph, Aoba retorts that she wanted many things when she was a child. Aoba remembers Wakaba describing her last dream, which included Aoba playing center field at Koshien. When Aoba forces Ko to tidy up before meeting reporters, he comments she reminds him of Wakaba. During the interview, he claims Mishima is the Ryuo batter he worries about the most. The day before the game against Ryuo, Azuma tells Ko that they have a chance of winning if Mishima stays on the bench.
27	"He May Be Right"; Transliteration: "...Kamo Shin'nai" (Japanese: …かもしんない)	4 October 2009
That afternoon, Maeno dismisses practice early. In a bookstore, Mishima and Ryuo backup pitcher Oikawa talk about how unlikely it is they will get to play against Seishu. Midori visits the Tsukishima batting cages, where Aoba tells her Seishu might beat Ryuo. That evening, Akaishi reviews tapes of Ryuo's games one more time, particularly Shimano's batting, while the rest of the team prepares their equipment. The next morning, after a press conference for Idol Ace, former manager Risa tunes in to the start of the game. In the first inning, Ryuo quickly retires all three Seishu batters, and Ko strikes out three Ryuo batters with nine pitches. In the second inning, Azuma hits a home run on the first pitch, while Shimano hits a single but is left on base. At the top of the fourth inning, Seishu still leading 1 to 0, Mishima asks to be sent out to the first base coach box during Ryuo's next at-bat.
28	"Let's End This"; Transliteration: "Owarase yōze" (Japanese: 終わらせようぜ)	11 October 2009
In the top of the fourth inning, Azuma hits a double but again fails to score. In the bottom of the inning, Mishima stands in the first base coach box, where he tells first-baseman Azuma he is having fun. Akaishi and Aoba are both impressed by Ko's pitching, and the end of six innings, with the score unchanged, Ko has struck out 10 of 18 batters. In the seventh inning, Shimano breaks a finger fielding Azuma's hit and is replaced by Mishima, making Ko and Akaishi worry about Seishu's chances. When Mishama bats, later that inning, he hits a solo home run to tie the game at 1. At the top of the ninth, Senda hits a single, thus ensuring that the best hitters of both teams, Azuma and Mishima, will bat again. As Azuma comes to bat with two outs, Ryuo sends out Oikawa as relief pitcher, and he intentionally walks Azuma before striking out Akaishi. Ko sacrifices control for speed to pitch to Mishima, who manages to hit a blazing line drive that Ko barely catches.
29	"No I'm Not!"; Transliteration: "Dare gya?" (Japanese: だれぎゃ?)	18 October 2009
Ko strikes out the last Ryuo batter, sending the game into extra innings, tied 1 to 1. At the top of the tenth, Ko loses control of his bat before successfully bunting, but is left on base. In the bottom of the inning, after fouling off Ko's fastball, a Ryuo batter loses his bat because his hands are numb from the previous pitch. With a runner on second, Oikawa hits a line drive that Ko, with his arm still affected by Mishima's hit, fails to catch. The runner scores, and Ryuo wins the game. After the game, Ko apologizes to a disappointed Aoba for losing, but she manages to smile. Ryuo goes on to easily win the prefectural tournament and their first game at Koshien. When Ko apologizes to Azuma for failing to make the play, Azuma tells him to focus instead on Aoba's disappointment at not being able to play in tournament games. As Ko and Azuma walk past the construction next-door to Kitamura Sports, they are told by a young woman who resembles Wakaba that it will be a soba restaurant.
30	"Wakaba"; Transliteration: "Wakaba" (Japanese: 若葉)	25 October 2009
Upon seeing the girl who looks like Wakaba, Ko remembers the summer Wakaba died. In a flashback, scenes of Wakaba from the first three episodes are shown, leading up to her death. In the present, the girl invites him to come to the restaurant when it opens.
31	"Do Ghosts Grow Older?"; Transliteration: "Toshi o Toru no ka na" (Japanese: 年をとるのかなァ)	1 November 2009
The girl, Akane Takigawa, apologizes to Ko for the construction noise. Later, Ko tells Azuma he does not know whether Akane really looks like Wakaba would now, because in his mind Wakaba is still in fifth grade. Mizuki invites Aoba to a summer festival the next day. Ko dreams of going to the festival with Wakaba, as she promised before she died, then of running to meet Akane at the Takigawa's soba restaurant. The next day, the anniversary of Wakaba's death, Aoba tells Ko to report his tournament result to Wakaba when he visits her grave. On his way back, he meets Akane wearing a yukata similar to Wakaba's. On her way to Wakaba's grave, Aoba sees them walking together and asks Mizuki if ghosts grow up. At the festival, Akaishi also sees them and asks Nakanishi the same question. Ko and Akane meet her parents at the festival, and after parting with them, Ko meets Momiji, Ichiyo, Aoba, and Mizuki. When Aoba asks where his companion went, they begin to squabble but suddenly stop when the Tsukishimas see Akane at random through the festival crowd.
32	"Hey"; Transliteration: "Chotto" (Japanese: ちょっと)	8 November 2009
When Azuma asks Aoba whether Akane really does look like Wakaba, Aoba says, just as Ko did, that in her mind Wakaba is still in fifth grade. Ryuo loses in the semifinal at Koshien. One morning after the Takigawa soba restaurant opens, when Akane and Ko walk to the train station together, he accidentally takes her case of art supplies and goes to her school to return it, where he helps stop an exhibitionist by hitting him with a baseball. During practice, when Aoba makes a bad pun, Azuma tells her she and Ko are a lot alike. Akane meets Momiji at a park where they both are sketching and walks her home, where Aoba and her father formally meet Akane for the first time. After Aoba rescues Akane from being harassed by some boys, Akane recognizes her from Ko's description of the three Tsukishima sisters. Aoba later asks Ko why he didn't tell Akane about Wakaba, then admits that Akane is very like Wakaba beyond just appearance.
33	"Or Is It Fate...?"; Transliteration: "Hata Mata Unmei...ka" (Japanese: はたまた運命･･･か)	15 November 2009
Seishu wins their first game of the autumn prefectural tournament. On a day without practice, Aoba and Ko each decide to clean their bedrooms, which neither does regularly. As thanks for saving her, Akane makes Aoba a frilly cushion, telling Ko that she always wanted a cute little sister like Aoba. While delivering it, Akane learns that Aoba had an older sister, Wakaba, who died. Aoba quite bluntly asks Ko and Akane that she wishes to continue cleaning and could they please leave. When Akaishi helps his father deliver liquor to the Takigawa soba shop, he again is shocked by Akane's appearance, dropping a complimentary glass, after which Akane learns from Senda (who happened to drop in whilst Akaishi was there) of her resemblance to Wakaba. After practicing in the Tsukishima batting cages, Azuma eats a meal cooked by Aoba at the Clover Cafe despite Ko's warnings. The next day Azuma has acute appendicitis and misses Seishu's next game. While watching it, Akane learns that Aoba cannot play in tournament games such as this one, and begins watching Aoba in the stands. The game is a pitchers' duel that Seishu ultimately loses 1 to 0, after the baseman continually fumble Ko's attempts to prevent stolen bases, and the runner advancing bases from bunted balls.
34	"Happy New Year"; Transliteration: "Akemashite" (Japanese: あけまして)	22 November 2009
On New Year's Eve, Ko helps the Takigawas deliver soba. At the Tsukishima's, he meets Junpei Azuma, who had forgotten he is driving his brother home for a visit. When Ko is done, Akane returns a book to him, thanking him for helping her draw a good picture for a competition. Ko, Akaishi, and Nakanishi go to a shrine to pray for good luck, and Senda follows to avoid practicing with Midori but fails to find them. Yuhei Azuma returns and finds Aoba alone in the Tsukishima batting cages, the rest of the family having gone to the shrine. Junpei's wallet is stolen at the shrine, and Ko and his friends chase the thief, but he is caught by Momiji's "candidate" boyfriend. In the batting cages, when Aoba tells Azuma she will not try out for the women's national team because does not want to take time away from practicing with Seishu, to help them get to Koshien, he tells her she should try for a Koshien of her own.
35	"14 February"; Transliteration: "Nigatsu Jūyokka" (Japanese: 2月14日)	29 November 2009
Because of their fall record, Seishu is not invited to the spring Koshien tournament. Akane wins that year's Koshien poster art contest with a painting of a pitcher that Aoba claims depicts Ko's form. Ko corrects her, saying that Akane based it on his photos of Aoba, which he had used to model his pitching style. From Akaishi, Akane learns of Wakaba's relationship with Ko. Aoba tells Azuma she will try out for the women's national team in March, and when she teases him about being given chocolates for Valentine's Day, he says the only girl he would consider going out with is her. For Valentine's Day, both Aoba and Azuma receive many chocolates. When Aoba drops Ko's chocolates off a bridge, she buys replacements, including one extra to give to Azuma for her. When Ko delivers it, Azuma says that he likes Aoba because she is hard to figure out, because she is not true to herself. That evening, Akane asks Ko to show her photographs of Wakaba. As she looks through his albums, she comments that it is obvious Wakaba loved him, and would still love him today. As she leaves, she gives him chocolate.
36	"To Women's Baseball?!"; Transliteration: "Joshi Yakyū e!?" (Japanese: 女子野球へ!?)	6 December 2009
The day of Aoba's tryout for the women's national team, Ko and Azuma see her off at the train station. During the journey, Midori, Matsuyama, and Kojima tell her that her play during Satomi's match with Oka a year ago inspired Satomi to win the girls' high school championship. At the tryouts, the Satomi players point out Shimano from Ryuo, who looks and plays like her cousin from the boys' team. In Tokyo, Ko waits out the rainy day in Akane's soba shop. During her batting tryout, Shimano is overshadowed by Oka's Ozaki. Kojima and Oka's Sawaguchi watch Aoba's pitching and are impressed by how her speed and control have improved. Before the coaches announce the results, Shimano insists on showing how she bats against a pitcher instead of a machine, and draws Aoba as her pitcher. Aoba strikes her out with three pitches, and Aoba, Matsuyama, and Midori all pass the first round of tryouts. At Seishu's practice the next day, Aoba pitches to Azuma, a challenge they both enjoy, until he hits her with a line drive.
37	"I Guess I Slept Well"; Transliteration: "Yoku Neta kara Desho" (Japanese: よく寝たからでしょ)	13 December 2009
Aoba is hospitalized with a broken foot and unable to play for a month. She claims will not affect the team, given she cannot participate in tournament games, but Ko tells Akane that Aoba really is frustrated. Because Azuma feels guilty, he stops hitting hard in practice and visits Aoba daily in the hospital, and because of this both Ichiyo and Nakanishi suggest he has feelings for her. Midori is disappointed that Aoba cannot participate in the second round of tryouts, and is herself wait-listed for the national team. Junpei Azuma proposes marriage to Ichiyo, who says yes on one condition, which she does not name. To keep Aoba occupied in the hospital, Ko brings her a ball and glove, after which a nurse says she looks more lively. Akaishi gives Akane two tickets his family cannot use and tells her to invite Ko to the performance. While watching Ryuo advance in the spring Koshien tournament, Aoba tells Azuma she will train hard when she gets out so Seishu will have a pitcher for batting practice who can match Oikawa.
38	"It's His First Date"; Transliteration: "Hatsu Dēto Desu yo" (Japanese: 初デートですよ)	20 December 2009
Ryuo continues to advance at Koshien. Akaishi gives Ko an introduction to kabuki theater to study up on it, saying that he set up Ko to take Akane to a performance because he wants to see Wakaba's smile. Outside of Aoba's hospital, Azuma meets Daimon, who says his new team will beat Ryuo. Aoba tells Azuma that Ko's date with Akane is his first, then assumes the glove maintenance kit Ko sent her is from Azuma. After the play, Ko and Akane visit the neighborhood where she grew up. Ko later gives Akaishi kabuki-themed snack food. At the start of the school year, when Ko becomes a third-year student and Momiji enters junior high school, Aoba is discharged. With Aoba out of the hospital, Azuma starts hitting hard again. In return for the kabuki tickets, Akane gives Akaishi a handmade mobile phone charm that she modeled after him, then later gives another to Ko.
39	"Since Forever"; Transliteration: "Zutto Zutto" (Japanese: ずっとずっと)	27 December 2009
Akaishi visits his old elementary school and remembers Wakaba describing her Koshien dream. Aoba teaches Ko new breaking pitches, which Azuma describes as her way of climbing on the mound in Koshien using Ko's body, and resumes training after her cast is removed. After Ryuo wins the spring Koshien tournament, its coach denies to reporters that he is worried about Seishu in the upcoming summer tournament. Akane becomes a waitress at the Clover Cafe. When Akane visits a flea market in another township, Aoba suggests that Ko accompany her, where in return for Aoba's coaching Ko buys her a garish T-shirt. Aoba tells Azuma that she does not regret not making the women's national team, then complains about how quickly Ko learns new pitches, saying that maybe she has underestimated him. When Ko gives her the shirt, she thanks him, to his surprise. Because the women's national team is short on pitchers with fastballs, the coach asks Aoba to join their training camp.
40	"Idiot!"; Transliteration: "Baka-tare!" (Japanese: バカたれ!)	10 January 2010
Distracted by the coach's request, Aoba burns a customer's order in the Clover Cafe. One night, Ko escorts Akane home because she thinks she is being followed by a stalker, and together Ko and Aoba catch a man who had recently stalked Aoba before finding her too scary. As punishment, Aoba forces the man to use the batting cages until he is exhausted. After Ichiyo tells Junpei Azuma she will marry him if Seishu goes to Koshien, he joins the team as an enthusiastic assistant coach; Ichiyo later tells Ko that she never said she would not marry Junpei if Seishu does not make it. When they go shopping together, Aoba tells Akane about her invitation to join the women's national team, and Akane suggests she chose the course that leads to the fewest regrets. While Junpei and Aoba scout a Ryuo practice, he asks whether she likes his brother. When she cannot answer, he suggests that she be honest with herself, and she later reassures him that Seishu will go to Koshien.
41	"Koshien, Here I Go!"; Transliteration: "Iku zo Kōshien!" (Japanese: 行くぞ甲子園!)	17 January 2010
Akane tells Aoba that she drew a lot as a child because she was sickly and could not play outdoors, unlike Wakaba. Akane claims Wakaba had no weaknesses but before Aoba can name one, Ko suggests her taste in guys. Ko visits Wakaba's grave on their 18th birthday, after which both Akane and Aoba give him cake and he buys the scheduled, slightly expensive earrings for Wakaba. A younger player tells Ko that the team has gotten a lot better because of Aoba's influence and gets Ko to confirm that she and Azuma are not yet officially dating. The brackets for the summer prefectural tournament are announced, which have Seishu meeting Daimon's current school, Kurokoma, in the second round. Aoba surprises Azuma by praising Ko's pitching, but that night she cannot guess what Akane and Wakaba see in Ko. Akane tells Aoba that she and Ko are a lot alike and that if she learns to love herself, she will see what Wakaba saw in Ko. At practice the next day, Aoba is surprised to see how hard Ko works. She asks him if he likes Akane, and he replies that she looks too much like Wakaba.
42	"Everyone's Summer"; Transliteration: "Sorezore no Natsu" (Japanese: それぞれの夏)	24 January 2010
Maeno announces a training camp for the week before the tournament. On her way home from school, Aoba finds Akane having a spell of weakness in the train station and walks her home. On the team's day off before the training camp, Mizuki complains to Ko about Azuma and Aoba being together so much; Nakanishi's girlfriend competes in a track-and-field tournament but loses in the quarterfinal heats; Junpei introduces Ichiyo to his parents; Akaishi meets former prefab teammate Makihara, who tells him to beat Ryuo to save Seishu's face; Azuma gives Senda batting tips at the Tsukishima cages; Tubby scouts a Ryuo practice, where Mishima tells her to not let Seishu lose before they meet; Akaishi and Ko practice pitching at the secret training place they used in junior high school; and Aoba tells Ozaki she has chosen to help take Seishu to Koshien instead of joining the national team. Aoba then pitches for Ozaki, striking her out. The next day, the Seishu training camp begins.
43	"She Hasn't Changed"; Transliteration: "Aikawarazu Da na ..." (Japanese: あいかわらずだな…)	31 January 2010
While scouting Seishu's first opponent in the tournament, Junpei meets Daimon and turns down an invitation to watch Kurokoma practice. Risa returns to Seishu for a photo shoot the day before Seishu's first game but refuses to interrupt the team practice. Various members of the team ask out Aoba based on whether they perform well during the game, while Ko asks to be excused from dating her if he strikes out at least 10 batters. The game is called for Seishu after five innings, but only Ko makes his promised goal. Daimon, watching from the stands, discounts Ko's performance based on how poorly the opponents batted. Aoba asks Ko if he wanted to avoid dating her so much, then advises him to conserve his strength in the future. Kurokoma plays Sena, the team led by Miki, and loses in a close game because Daimon refuses to use his ace pitcher against a "no-name" school.
44	"A Careless Pitch?"; Transliteration: "Shittō ... ka?" (Japanese: 失投…か?)	7 February 2010
Azuma tells Aoba that to understand her popularity, she needs to recognize her good points outside of her baseball skills. When she asks Ko what those are, he tells her that one can to be too close things to see them clearly, and as she watches fans cheer him during the game against Sena, she admits he might be right. After Miki bats for the first time against Ko, Miki admits to Akaishi he may have transferred from Seishu too early. Seishu gets on base each of the first seven innings but fails to score, while not allowing Sena any hits. When Ko complains about how well Miki knows Seishu's abilities, Azuma says Miki has not accounted for Aoba's influence on the younger Seishu players and in the bottom of the eighth, one of them hits a three-run homer. At the end of the ninth, Miki hits a home run, preventing Ko from pitching a no-hitter. Seishu wins 3 to 1.
45	"That's My Line!"; Transliteration: "Kocchi no Serifu Daro!" (Japanese: こっちのセリフだろ!)	14 February 2010
When Seishu wins another game in the tournament, Mizuki complains because it means putting off camping with Aoba. Because she is not feeling well, Akane does not go to work nor to the game, which worries Akaishi. Based on Aoba's coaching, Ko adjusts his pitching form during the next game, which sacrifices control but gives him a speed near 100 mph. Despite his walking many batters, Seishu wins to advance to the quarterfinals. Ko tries to explain to reporters how Aoba is important to himself and the team, even though she cannot play in tournament games. Akane enters the hospital to be tested for an unspecified illness, which disturbs Akaishi's focus. When Aoba visits her, she is startled by Akane repeating something Wakaba once said about Ko. During the quarterfinal game, Akaishi is still distracted, but with Ko's improved control while still maintaining his speed, plus Azuma's batting, Seishu wins.
46	"I've Got a Bad Feeling"; Transliteration: "Yā na Kanji Da nā" (Japanese: やーな感じだなァ)	21 February 2010
Akaishi and Aoba visit Akane in the hospital, where she tells them that she promised to go on a date with Ko after the tournament, and that she may require surgery. In the semifinal, Seishu plays Nishikura, a team that has come from behind to win every game by one run. Senda hits a home run on first pitch of the game, and Nishikura scores a run in the first inning as well. Spurred by Akane's worries, Akaishi hits another home run in the second inning. In the eighth inning, with Nishikura having failed to get on base since the second inning, Seishu scores six runs. Nishikura does not score in the bottom of the inning and the game is called for Seishu, 8 to 1. After the game, Ko finally visits Akane in the hospital for the first time, where he praises Akaishi's performance and then asks when her surgery is.
47	"Can I Lie?"; Transliteration: "Uso Tsuite mo Ii ka?" (Japanese: ウソついてもいいか?)	7 March 2010
Ko promises Akane he will tell Akaishi that she will be out in a couple days, saying that he is a pretty good liar. Akane tells him that her surgery will be on the day of the tournament final against heavily favored Ryuo, so she will have to put off their date, then asks him to tell Aoba the truth. Ko tells Akaishi the lie, then asks Aoba to visit Wakaba's grave with him. While there, he prays that the surgery is successful and tells Aoba that Wakaba would not let her cry again. At practice, when Aoba jokingly asks Azuma out to a movie, he asks if she means to ask him out so lightly, saying he seriously likes her. The morning before the game, Aoba asks Ko if he likes Akane more than herself, to which he asks if he can lie. While warming up in the stadium, Ko spots Momiji, who flashes him a peace sign, after which he celebrates. At the hospital, when Akane's surgery is over, Aoba tells Momiji by text message to give Ko a peace sign to tell him it was successful.
48	"All Right"; Transliteration: "Yoshi" (Japanese: よし)	14 March 2010
Aoba arrives at the stadium in time to see Ko's first pitch at the bottom of the first inning. On the mound, Ko tells Akaishi about Akane's surgery, and Akaishi is annoyed at being kept in the dark. Ko consistently pitches over 94 mph and retires all three batters with two strikeouts. Before batting in the second inning, Azuma tells Akaishi his only regret staying with Seishu is never getting to face Ko's pitches. Ryuo's pitcher Oikawa walks Azuma but strikes out the rest of the side. In the bottom of the second, Mishima gets on base with a drag bunt, and while on first base tells Azuma he did it to keep Ko from having a no-hitter. No other batters get on base in the first six innings except by walks. In the seventh inning, Azuma hits a single, then is batted in by Akaishi, a hit that Akane watches from her hospital room. Seishu leads 1 to 0.
49	"Are You Having Fun?"; Transliteration: "Tanoshinderu ka?" (Japanese: 楽しんでるか?)	21 March 2010
In the seventh inning, Ko strikes out Mishima with pitches reaching the high 90s mph, though Ko is disappointed he did not show Aoba a 100 mph fastball as he promised before the game. In the eighth inning, Oikawa tries to repeat the previous year's line drive to Ko, but Ko catches it. In the bottom of the ninth, Ryuo manages to score, sending the game into extra innings, tied 1 to 1. In the top of the 10th, Azuma hits a triple, after which Oikawa intentionally walks Akaishi and Ko, to load the bases with no outs. However, Seishu's last three batters are unable to hit, stranding the runners on base. As Seishu takes the field, Azuma warns Ko to not let Mishima get on base or Ryuo will keep the momentum. With Ko still pitching in the high 90s mph, Mishima hits a hard line drive to first that Azuma barely catches. Aoba remembers seeing Ko cry while practicing pitching shortly after Wakaba died. In the top of the 12th with two outs, when Ko comes to bat he remembers hitting home runs in the Tsukishima batting cages, and as he does so hits a home run.
50	"More Than Anyone in the World..."; Transliteration: "Sekaijū de Ichiban..." (Japanese: 世界中で一番…)	28 March 2010
In the bottom of the 12th with Seishu leading 2 to 1, because Ko is tiring, Akaishi tells him to pitch all out to decide the game now. With two outs and a runner on first, Mishima comes to bat. Still pitching in the high 90s mph, after reaching a full count, Ko walks Mishima with what Junpei calls the fastest pitch of the day also that Aoba and Mishima was shocked about that pitch. As Aoba watches Ko strike out the last batter, she remembers what he said before the game: that Seishu would go to Koshien, he would pitch 100 mph, and he loves her more than anyone. After the game Ko hugs Aoba, who slaps him, saying she hates him more than anyone, then cries into his chest. The morning before traveling to Koshien, Akaishi visits Akane in the hospital, Nakanishi consoles Azuma for losing Aoba, and Aoba and Ko meet at a cafe near the train station, where they talk about Wakaba and Akane's influence. When leaving the cafe Aoba has to drag Ko to the station (by holding hands), while waiting for the train Ko asks, "how long are we going to hold hands?" which she replies with, "You can let go if you don't like it." the scene ends with them waiting for the train, still holding hands. During the closing credits, Ichiyo Tsukishima and Junpei Azuma get married.

== See also ==
- List of Cross Game characters
- List of Cross Game chapters
