= List of Cross Game chapters =

Cross Game volume 1 cover as published by Shogakukan on 2 September 2005 in Japan

Cross Game is a romantic comedy sports manga series written and illustrated by Mitsuru Adachi and published by Shogakukan. It was serialized in the shōnen manga magazine Weekly Shōnen Sunday from 11 May 2005 (issue 22/23 2005) through 17 February 2010 (issue 12 2010). The individual chapters have been collected into 17 tankōbon volumes, the first of which was released on 2 September 2005, the last on 16 April 2010. A special edition of volume 17 was also released with a 72-page All Color Works: Cross Game mini art book containing all the full-color pages from the original run in Shōnen Sunday as well as the tankōbon cover images.

The series is about the high school baseball players Ko Kitamura and Aoba Tsukishima and their attempts to fulfill the dream of Aoba's dead sister, Wakaba, of seeing them play in the national championship tournament in Koshien. In 2009, it received the Shogakukan Manga Award for shōnen manga.

The series is divided into multiple parts. Part 1, "The Season of Wakaba", consists solely of volume one, and takes place while the main characters are in elementary school. Part 2, "The Season of Aoba", consists of volumes two through fourteen. It begins four years later with Ko in his third year of junior high school and continues into high school. In Part 2, the chapter numbering begins again from one. In October 2008, the series went on hiatus at the end of Part 2 and was resumed in March 2009 with Part 3, which is untitled, beginning with Ko in the summer of his third year of high school.

The series was adapted into a 50-episode anime television series that began airing on the TV Tokyo network on 5 April 2009. The manga is licensed in France by Editions Tonkam, in Italy by Flashbook Editore, in South Korea by Daiwon C.I., in Hong Kong by Jonesky, in Taiwan by Chingwin Publishing Group, in Indonesia by Elex Media Komputindo, and in Thailand by Vibulkij Publishing. Viz Media has licensed the series in North America, with the first volume released on 12 October 2010.

== Chapters and volumes ==
Note: This list uses the chapter titles from Viz Media's English adaptation up to volume 5, literal translations thereafter.

No.	Original release date	Original ISBN	North America release date	North America ISBN
1	2 September 2005	4-09-127351-3	12 October 2010 (Note: The first Viz Media omnibus volume contains the first three volumes of the Japanese release. This is stated in bold print on the back of this volume: "Three in one! Contains volumes 1, 2 and 3 as released in Japan.")	978-1-4215-3758-0
Part 1 – The Season of Wakaba (若葉の季節, Wakaba no Kisetsu): 1. "Four-Leaf Clover" (四葉のクローバー, "Yotsuba no Kurōbā"); 2. "Since I Was Three" (3歳から, "Sansai kara"); 3. "Get Ready" (構えろ, "Kamaero"); 4. "What Did You Draw?" (何描いたんだ?, "Nani Egaita n'Da?"); 5. "Just Barely Safe" (ギリギリセーフ, "Girigiri Sēfu"); *: 6. "Yowch!" (キャイン!, "Kyain!"); 7. "Why, You—!" (ニャロ!, "Nyaro!"); 8. "Fireworks" (花火, "Hanabi"); 9. "She Said by Evening" (夕方って言ってた, "Yūgata 'tte Itte 'ta"); 10. "It's Simple" (かんたんな事なんだ, "Kantan na Koto Nanda")
Fifth-grader Ko Kitamura was born on the same day and in the same hospital as his neighbor, Wakaba Tsukishima, who treats him as her boyfriend as a result. One day in early summer, she makes him take her to swimming lessons on his bicycle. On the way back, to avoid classmate Osamu Akaishi, who also likes Wakaba, Ko joins a sandlot baseball game. Because he has never played before, he fields badly, but because he has practiced in the Tsukishima family's batting cages since he was three years old, he hits the game-winning home run. After their joint 11th birthday, Wakaba gives Ko a schedule of birthday presents for him to give her through age 20. Ko's classmate Daiki Nakanishi makes him practice and subsequently pitch in a sandlot game against a team with Wakaba's little sister Aoba as pitcher. It is a close game, but in the end they lose. Wakaba later tells Aoba that Ko might one day pitch 160 kilometers per hour (99 mph), Aoba's ideal in a man, but that if he does, Aoba cannot have him. At a swimming camp, Wakaba drowns while saving a younger girl. Ko knows not how to respond to this until, on the evening after her funeral, he sees Akaishi crying outside Wakaba's house, which makes him realize that he just needs to cry.
2	15 December 2005	978-4-09-127352-9	12 October 2010	978-1-4215-3758-0
Part 2 – The Season of Aoba (青葉の季節, Aoba no Kisetsu): 1. "I'm Free" (ヒマだよ, "Hima Da yo"); 2. "Just a Daily Routine" (ただの日課だよ, "Tada no Nikka Da yo"); 3. "I Hate Him!" (大っ嫌い!, "Daikkirai!"); 4. "Change Pitchers!" (ピッチャー交代!, "Pitchā Koudai!"); 5. "For Real?" (ちゃんと?, "Chanto?"); *: 6. "Scumbags" (ゲスだ, "Gesu Da"); 7. "Amazing Jr. High Student" (お手柄中学生, "Otegara Chūgakusei"); 8. "Who Was That?" (何者?, "Nanimono?"); 9. "Secret Weapon" (秘密兵器, "Himitsu Heiki"); 10. "Can I Borrow a Pot?" (ナベ貸してくれる?, "Nabe Kashitekureru?")
Four years later, in her second year at Seishu Junior High, Aoba is a pitcher for the school baseball team. Inspired by her and by a promise to Wakaba, Ko (in his third year) has been following Aoba's workout routine, although Aoba still hates him for having monopolized Wakaba. Starting pitcher Keiichiro Senda asks Aoba out without waiting for a response. When she does not show up, Senda goes to her house but is frightened off by the family cat. When Ko hits four home runs at the Tsukishima batting cages, Aoba is annoyed, especially since she cannot match it. Nakanishi recruits Ko for a reunion game of their sandlot team and, with Ko fielding and batting, they win in a close game. Afterward, Nakanishi learns that Ko refrained from joining the middle school team, despite his surprisingly fast fastball, because Nakanishi had been kicked off it for fighting. Aoba and Ko foil a burglary, which they glimpsed from the train to school, by hitting the burglar with a baseball, but Senda receives the credit for it. Akaishi disbelieves Senda foiled the robbery and learns from Aoba that she threw the ball and Ko had been carrying it. Later, he learns from Nakanishi that he and Ko have been training. Akaishi takes over Ko's secret training on the condition that Nakanishi joins the high school baseball team. At the Tsukishima batting cages, an unknown boy breaks Ko's home run record and complains that the pitching machines are too slow. As Ko practices pitching with Akaishi as catcher, the latter tells him about a dream Wakaba had the night before she left for swimming camp. In the dream, Ko and Akaishi were playing as a battery at Koshien. During New Year's Eve, Aoba's little sister Momiji gets sick and Ko stays at their house to care for her, because Aoba is a bad nurse and cook.
	17 March 2006	978-4-09-120130-0	12 October 2010	978-1-4215-3758-0
11. "The First Spring of High School" (高1の春, "Kōichi no Haru"); 12. "Why Did You Even Join the Baseball Team?" (何で野球部に, "Nande Yakyūbu ni"); 13. "Who Are You?" (誰だ?おまえ, "Dare Da? Omae"); 14. "A Good Dream" (いい夢が見れそうだ, "Ii Yume ga Miresou Da"); 15. "Nope" (んにゃ., "Nnya."); 16. "Aoba Tsukishima" (月島青葉, "Tsukishima Aoba"); 17. "A Sucker for a Pretty Face" (面食いなんです, "Menkui Nan Desu"); 18. "We Think Alike" (気が合うな, "Ki ga Au na"); 19. "Two of a Kind" (似てるんだ, "Niterun Da"); 20. "A Nightmare!" (悪夢じゃ!, "Akumu Ja!")
When Ko enters Seishu High School, he learns that the baseball team has a new head coach, Shugo Daimon, who has recruited ringers from around the country (including power hitter Yuhei Azuma, the unknown boy at the batting center), and that the current players as well as Maeno, the former head coach, have been shunted to a second-string team, called the "portable" team because it is housed in a portable hut. Senda passes the selection test for the varsity team, but Ko, Akaishi, and Nakanishi do not take it and are put on the portable team. Before the summer tournament, the two teams are to hold a scrimmage, that, according to rumor, is to determine the future of the portable players. To surprise Coach Daimon at the scrimmage, Coach Maeno has Ko and Akaishi not use their full strength when practicing in sight of the varsity players. Daimon recruits Aoba from the junior high team as a practice pitcher, and is surprised when she almost strikes out Azuma even after pitching too much. Afterward, Aoba tells Ko that she will continue pitching for the varsity players to learn their batting weaknesses. While the portable team prepares for the scrimmage, Maeno approves Akaishi's proposed strategy and lineup.
4	16 June 2006	978-4-09-120419-6	11 January 2011 (Note: The second Viz Media omnibus volume contains the volumes 4 and 5 of the Japanese release. This is stated in bold print on the back of this volume: "Two in one! Contains volumes 4 and 5 as released in Japan.")	978-1-4215-3766-5
21. "Is Aoba Around?" (青葉いる?, "Aoba Iru?"); 22. "No Fair!" (ケチ!, "Kechi!"); 23. "Who's That Pitcher?" (何者かね?, "Nanimono ka ne?"); 24. "Oh Boy..." (はてさて..., "Hate sate..."); 25. "Let's Do This" (しまって行こ――, "Shimatte Iko――"); 26. "... I Get It" (...なるほど, "... Naru Hodo"); 27. "Urk!" (ギク!, "Giku!"); 28. "Not Your Right Hand" (ダメです, "Dame Desu"); 29. "Which Do You Think?" (どっちの方が, "Docchi no Kata ga"); 30. "Yeah, Right" (冗談はよせ, "Jōdan wa Yose")
The night before the scrimmage, Ko asks Aoba's opinion of his pitching, because, he says, he has never played in an official game and so has no comparison for it. She calls it "not bad" (まァまァ...だな, maa maa...da na), which pleases him. He then makes a bet with her that he will keep the varsity team from scoring more than five runs. After Senda, the starting pitcher for the varsity team, allows the portable team to get three runs in the second inning, Daimon kicks him off the team and Maeno substitutes him in as shortstop for the portables. Though Daimon is confident that his batters can hit against an unknown pitcher even without his coaching, Ko's pitching speed and Aoba's data on their batters cause trouble for the varsity players, with the exception of Azuma. Because of his lack of experience and stamina, Ko tires out quickly. In the fifth inning, he tells catcher Akaishi that he can have either speed or control, but not both. Akaishi has him go for speed and, despite his erratic pitches, the varsity players still have trouble hitting. In spite of his batters' difficulties, Daimon persists on seeing Ko as a nobody for being on the portable team, which in his view is totally worthless. In the bottom of the sixth inning, Azuma hits his third home run, putting the varsity team up 5 to 3.
5	15 September 2006	978-4-09-120589-6	11 January 2011	978-1-4215-3766-5
31. "Moving Up to Varsity" (一軍からのお呼び, "Ichigun kara no Oyobi"); 32. "Forgive Me, Makihara" (許してくれ巻原, "Yurushite Kure Makihara"); 33. "Have a Great Time" (楽しんでこい, "Tanoshinde Koi"); 34. "You're Not Using Your Head (頭が悪過ぎる, "Atama ga Warusugiru"); 35. "Wipe That Smirk Off Your Face" (ニヤニヤするな, "Niya Niya Suru na"); 36. "Inter-Police What?" (家宅捜索令状?, "Katoku Sōsaku Reijō?"); 37. "A Bit More Confidence" (自身になったろ, "Jishin ni Nattaro"); 38. "I'll Look Forward to That" (そいつは楽しみだ, "Soitsu wa Tanoshimi da"); 39. "Especially Childhood Friends..." (幼なじみなら..., "Osanajimi nara..."); 40. "If He Were That Kind of Ace" (そんなエースだったら, "Sonna Ēsu Dattara")
After portable player Makihara is tagged out while running for home, Senda reveals that Daimon will not promote anyone to varsity, no matter how well they play, but Maeno convinces Makihara to play his best anyway, for pride alone. At the bottom of the seventh, varsity center fielder Miki notices that if Ko had walked Azuma, the portables would be ahead three to one. At the top of the ninth, Ko bats in two runners, tieing the game. While on base, he tells Azuma that he did not think the latter would hit the pitches he turned into home runs. At the bottom of the ninth, Ko strikes out Azuma, but gives up a game-winning double to the next batter. A few days later, Ko helps the spoiled varsity manager shop for a day in return for the last available teapot which is the 16th birthday gift on Wakaba's schedule of presents, which Ko had promised to buy her. While Seishu's varsity team plays in the prefectural summer baseball tournament, Maeno takes the portable team on an intensive training camp in the mountains. Ko forgets a suitcase and Aoba takes it to him by bus. She is misdirected by Ko's father and a local woodcutter and gets lost in a thunderstorm. Eventually, she is found by Ko and Senda. Maeno tells Aoba that the other players are training hard because they have become fans of Ko. Because Miki ignored Daimon's instructions to make a play, he is left out of the Seishu lineup in the round-of-16 game.
6	16 December 2006	978-4-09-120697-8	12 April 2011 (Note: The third Viz Media omnibus volume contains the volumes 6 and 7 of the Japanese release.)	978-1-4215-3767-2
41. "Amazing, Amazing!" (上等上等!, "Jōtō Jōtō!"); 42. "Nanten?" (何点?, "Nanten?"); 43. "Cocky Little First-Year" (生意気な一年坊主, "Namaiki na Ichinen Bōzu"); 44. "And Who in the World Are You?" (何様かね?, "Nani-sama ka ne?"); 45. "Big Brother" (兄ちゃん, "Nii-chan"); 46. "Middle Schoolers?" (中学生?, "Chūgakusei?"); 47. "Junpei Azuma" (東純平, "Azuma Junpei"); 48. "Boy, I'm Rattled" (緊張するなア, "Kinchōsuru naa"); 49. "Chairman?!" (理事長!?, "Rijichō!?"); 50. "Of Course Not" (知るわけないだろ, "Shiru Wakenai Daro")
Without Miki batting, Seishu fails to reach the quarterfinals. After the game, Aoba meets Junpei Azuma, Yuhei Azuma's older brother, who drives her home and becomes a regular suitor of her older sister, Ichiyo. Aoba and Ko visit the local swimming pool, where they are reminded of swimming with Wakaba. Daimon learns that the portable team has been playing against other teams, but dismisses it as they lost all six games. However, Azuma learns that they were playing against teams, who all reached the quarterfinals or better in the summer tournament. The interim principal, who has been backing Daimon, orders the portable team dissolved. However, Maeno proposes to instead hold a rematch scrimmage with the losing team's coach losing his job. Daimon agrees. Because of his differences with Daimon, Miki transfers out. The portable players recruit Aoba to play center field for the scrimmage. Before the scrimmage, Azuma deliberately injures himself to avoid playing and tells Daimon to prove that he has enough other good players to take him to Koshien. Daimon says that he will overlook the incident and that the interim principal will not honor the agreement with Maeno anyway. As the scrimmage starts, the school chairman, who is also the grandfather of the portable team's manager, tells Daimon and the interim principal that he ratifies the coaching wager. The first two innings, Ko lets the bases get loaded before striking out the next three batters. To calm him, Akaishi tells Ko to pitch as if they were in extra innings and a single run would lose the game. By the middle of the sixth inning, the game is scoreless.
7	16 March 2007	978-4-09-121020-3	12 April 2011	978-1-4215-3767-2
51. "Betrayed" (裏切った, "Uragitta"); 52. "He" (あいつ, "Aitsu"); 53. "Tiring" (シンドイな, "Shindoi na"); 54. "It Was You, Right?" (いたのかね?, "Ita no ka ne?"); 55. "It's a Date" (デートなんだから, "Dēto Nandakara"); 56. "First Dream" (初夢, "Hatsuyume"); 57. "Well That's a Load of Nonsense" (デタラメな話だな, "Detarame na Hanashi Da na); 58. "Fond Memories..." (思い出の..., "Omoide no..."); 59. "Playing on the Hill Around Back" (裏山に遊びに, "Urayama no Asobi ni"); 60. "Early Bird Gets the Fried Tofu" (トンビに油あげ, "Tonbi ni Aburaage")
Daimon tells the interim principal not to worry, as the varsity pitcher is throwing a perfect game. However, at the top of the seventh, the pitcher starts tiring. Aoba hits a single, then scores off Senda's fly ball. The chairman tells the interim principal that he has heard about irregularities in the school's finances and that he trusts that his faith in Daimon's winning program was well placed. Azuma tells Daimon that they need more batters like Miki, as Ko is an even better pitcher than he was during the first scrimmage and the best they have faced all year. In the bottom of the ninth, Ko strikes out all three varsity batters, winning the game. Daimon is fired and many of his picked players follow him to another school. Azuma stays and begins living with the Kitamuras because the baseball dorm is closed down. When Azuma asks him about a photograph of Wakaba, Ko admits that he was in love with her. In response to Junpei asking about it, Ko says that he based his pitching form on Aoba's. He then learns from her that Junpei's promising career as a pitcher was ended by an injury. Aoba later goes on a date with five boys at once to get them to stop asking her out. The spoiled manager has the team help her learn how to pitch for an audition for the movie adaptation of Idol Ace, and she quits the team when she gets a supporting role. During Ko's first visit to Aoba's maternal grandparents after Wakaba's death, Ko and Aoba are reminded of her. The following spring, Aoba's cousin, Mizuki Asami, comes to live with the Tsukishimas.
8	18 June 2007	978-4-09-121075-3	12 July 2011 (Note: The fourth Viz Media omnibus volume contains the volumes 8 and 9 of the Japanese release.)	978-1-4215-3768-9
61. "Mizuki Asami" (朝見水輝, "Asami Mizuki"); 62. "Izzat So" (ほんまかいな, "Honma Kai na"); 63. "They Can" (できます, "Dekimasu"); 64. "That's Just a False Rumor" (それはデマです, "Sore wa Dema Desu"); 65. "Hustle!" (ダッシュ!, "Dasshu!"); 66. "Maybe You're a Good Person" (いい奴かもしんない, "Ii Yatsu Kamoshinnai"); 67. "Only Three Pastries!" (パンは3つまで!, "Pan wa Mitsu made!"); 68. "Is That a Bad Thing?" (ダメ?それじゃ, "Dame? Sore ja"); 69. "Who Was That Guy, Again?" (誰だっけ?あいつ, "Dare Dakke? Aitsu"); 70. "Regardless" (何はともあれ, "Nani wa Tomoare")
At the start of the school year, Aoba and Mizuki enter Seishu High School. Aoba joins the baseball team, which pleases Akaishi and Maeno even though she cannot play in regulation games. Mizuki expresses an interest in Aoba and wonders whether Ko's fastball has reached 160 km/h. Several girls ask Mizuki out. He turns them down, claiming to be in love with Aoba, and tells some irate boys that the rumor that Aoba is going out with Ko is false. During their first practice game of the season, Aoba is the starting pitcher. When Ko takes over, Akaishi tells him not to throw too hard just to compete. Mizuki takes Aoba to a movie that she once saw with Wakaba, though Aoba refuses to call it a date. Afterwards, Mizuki puts up anonymous posters at school, which claim that he and Aoba are a couple. After watching Aoba and Ko squabble, Ichiyo notes their similarity. Aoba tries to set a classmate up with Ko and is annoyed when he turns her down. Ko, Akaishi, Azuma, and Nakanishi scout a practice game of the local favorite team, Ryuō Academy, where they meet Miki, who is also scouting Ryuō for another school. For Wakaba's 17th birthday, Ko buys the scheduled shiny pendent. When the prefectural tournament schedule is announced, Ryuō is seeded first and Seishu is bracketed to play them in their third game.
9	18 September 2007	978-4-09-121170-5	12 July 2011	978-1-4215-3768-9
71. "Don't Quit" (やめるなよ, "Yameruna yo"); 72. "It's an Honor" (光栄ですね, "Kōei Desu ne"); 73. "Ko Can Do It!" (光なら出来る!, "Kō nara Dekiru!"); 74. "Of Course" (当然, "Tōzen"); 75. "One in 10 Years" (10年に一人, "Jūnen ni Hitori"); 76. "Where Would You Like It?" (どこがいい?, "Doko ga Ii?"); 77. "... I Know" (...知ってるよ, "... Shitteru yo"); 78. "Don't Laugh" (笑ってねえよ, "Waratte nee yo"); 79. "... Possibly" (...かもしんない, "... Kamoshinnai"); 80. "Expected Nothing Less" (さすがですね, "Sasuga Desu ne")
Seishu's first game of the tournament is called in the fifth inning. Afterward, Ko catches pitches for Aoba, who was for the first time not allowed to play, because she is a girl. A scout for their next opponent, Sannō, overhears Akaishi and Nakahara discuss their own team's weaknesses. Seishu has trouble the first couple innings handling Sannō's bunting, however, with Ko's fielding, they hold them to only one run. Sannō's coach describes a pitcher who can strike out bunters as a player seen only once every ten years. When Seishu starts scoring in the sixth, Maeno attributes this to Seishu's players being too inexperienced to have consistent weaknesses. After Seishu wins 8–1, the newspaper coverage highlights Ko's 150-kilometer-per-hour (93 mph) fastball. When Mizuki comments that Ko has not reached 160 km/h, Aoba says that she wanted many things when she was a child. In a flashback, Wakaba describes her final dream to Aoba, which includes Aoba playing center field at Koshien. The game against the first-seeded Ryuō begins. In the first inning, both pitchers retire three straight batters, but Azuma hits a home run at the top of the second. Ryuō's star batter, Shimano, who forced his coach to keep the team's other strong batter, Mishima, on the bench to keep attention on himself, manages to hit a single, but is left on base. At the bottom of the third, Seishu is leading 1–0.
10	15 December 2007	978-4-09-121230-6	11 October 2011 (Note: The fifth Viz Media omnibus volume contains the volumes 10 and 11 of the Japanese release.)	978-1-4215-3769-6
81. "Will It Be a Match?" (勝負ですか?, "Shōbu Desu ka?"); 82. "How Many People?" (何人いる?, "Nannin Iru?"); 83. "Oikawa!" (及川!); 84. "It'll Come Around" (回りますよ, "Mawarimasu yo"); 85. "We'll Finish It" (終わらせようぜ, "Owarase yōze"); 86. "He'll Hold Him Down" (抑えますよ, "Osaemasu yo"); 87. "Time to Go for It" (狙ってみるか, "Neratemiru ka"); 88. "Who?!" (だれがァ!?, "Dare ga!?"); 89. "11:14" (11時14分, "Jūichi-ji Jūyon-pun"); 90. "11:15" (11時15分, "Jūichi-ji Jūgo-fun")
For Ryuō's next turn batting, Mishima stands in the first base coach box, where he tells Azuma that he is enjoying himself. In the seventh inning, with the score unchanged, Ko strikes out his tenth batter. Shimano breaks a finger while catching Azuma's hit and is replaced by Mishima, who, the next time Ryuō bats, hits a solo home run, tying the game. At the top of the ninth, Senda hits a single, thus ensuring that both teams' best hitters, Azuma and Mishima, will bat again. As Azuma comes to bat with two outs, Ryuō sends out a relief pitcher, who intentionally walks Azuma before striking out Akaishi. Ko starts sacrificing control for speed to pitch for Mishima, who manages to hit a blazing line drive that Ko catches. The game goes into extra innings. At the bottom of the tenth, with two out and a runner on second, Ryuō's pitcher hits a line drive that Ko, with his arm still affected by Mishima's hit, fails to catch. Ryuō scores, winning the game. Aoba, who had been enthusiastically cheering Ko's pitching, is disappointed but manages to smile at Ko afterward.
11	18 February 2008	978-4-09-121328-0	11 October 2011	978-1-4215-3769-6
91. "The Thing You Should Bear" (おまえが背負うのは, "Omae ga Seō no wa"); 92. "Wa-ka-ba" (わ·か·ば, "Wa. Ka. Ba."); 93. "Summer Festival" (夏祭り, "Natsumatsuri"); 94. "Grow Older" (年をとるのかなァ, "Toshi o Toru no ka na"); 95. "That's What He Said" (同じ事言ってやがら, "Onaji Koto Itte Yagara"); 96. "Where's Our Ace?!" (エースはどうしたァ!?, "Ēsu wa Dōshita!?"); 97. "Wait" (ちょっと, "Chotto"); 98. "What Did You Tell Her?" (何を話したの?, "Nani o Hanashita no?"); 99. "She's My Older Sister" (お姉ちゃんです., "Onee-chan Desu."); 100. "Or Is It Fate...?" (はたまた運命･･･か., "Hata Mata Unmei...ka")
Ryuō easily wins the rest of the games in the prefectural tournament and their first round at Koshien. Azuma tells Ko not to apologize for Seishu's loss, but instead to focus on Aoba's disappointment at not being able to play in official games. A soba shop opens next door to Kitamura Sports and the owners' daughter, Akane Takigawa, has an uncanny resemblance to Wakaba. The Tsukishimas are shocked when they meet her at a summer festival on the sixth anniversary of Wakaba's death. Ryuō continues to advance in the Koshien tournament, but loses in the semifinal. On the first day of the fall semester, Ko accidentally takes Akane's case of art supplies and returns it to her school, where he helps stop an exhibitionist by hitting him with a baseball. Azuma tells Aoba that she and Ko are a lot alike. After Aoba rescues Akane from being harassed by some boys, Akane quickly becomes friends with her, saying that she always wanted a little sister. After Akaishi is twice shocked by Akane's appearance, she finally learns of her resemblance to Wakaba from Senda.
12	28 May 2008	978-4-09-121408-9	24 January 2012 (Note: The sixth Viz Media omnibus volume contains the volumes 12 and 13 of the Japanese release.)	978-1-4215-3770-2
101. "What's That Supposed to Mean?" (どういう意味かな?, "Dōiu Imi ka na?"); 102. "Do I Really Look That Much Like Her?" (そんなに似てますか?, "Sonna ni Nitemasu ka?"); 103. "14 February" (2月14日, "Nigatsu Jūyokka"); 104. "Tsukishima Gave It to Me?" (月島がおれに?, "Tsukishima ga Ore ni?"); 105. "And You Believe Her?" (信じるの?, "Shinjiru no?"); 106. "I Might Be a Pestilence" (疫病神かもしれねえな, "Ekibyōgami Kamoshirenee na"); 107. "Only Because I Had a Good Nap" (よく寝たからでしょ, "Yoku Neta kara Desho"); 108. "From Today" (今日からだよ, "Kyō kara Da yo"); 109. "It's His First Date" (初デートですよ, "Hatsu Dēto Desu yo"); 110. "It Goes So Fast" (早えな, "Hayae na")
Because of their fall record, Seishu is not invited to the spring Koshien tournament. Akane wins that year's Kōshein poster art contest with a picture based on photos of Aoba, which Ko had used to model his pitching after. Azuma tells Aoba that the only girl he would consider going out with is her. For Valentine's Day, Aoba has Ko give Azuma chocolates from her. Akane tells Ko that she will give him chocolates if he shows her a photo of Wakaba. Azuma later says to Ko that he likes Aoba because she is hard to figure out, since she is not true to herself. When Akane sees photos of Ko and Wakaba together, she comments on how obvious it is that Wakaba loved him and that she would still love him today. Then she gives him belated Valentine's chocolate. Azuma accidentally hits Aoba with a line drive during practice, breaking her leg. Because he feels guilty about it, he stops hitting hard during practice. To keep Aoba occupied in the hospital, Ko brings her a ball and a glove. Akaishi gives Akane tickets to a kabuki performance and tells her that Ko likes it. Then he gives Ko a book to study up on it. Ko goes with her on his first date and afterwards brings Akaishi kabuki-themed snacks. When Aoba is discharged, Azuma starts hitting hard again. Ryuō wins the spring Kōshein tournament.
13	18 September 2008	978-4-09-121537-6	24 January 2012	978-1-4215-3770-2
111. "It Feels Good" (気持ちがいい, "Kimochi ga Ii"); 112. "On the Mound at Koshien" (甲子園のマウンドに, "Kōshien no Maundo ni"); 113. "All Three of Them" (あの三人には, "Ano Sannin ni wa"); 114. "Seishu?" (せいしゅう?, Seishū?); 115. "You Don't Get That Feeling?" (そんな気がしない?, "Sonna Ki ga Shinai?"); 116. "Always" (ずっとずっと, "Zutto Zutto"); 117. "Let's Go, Koshien!" (行くぞ甲子園!, "Ikuzo Kōshien!"); 118. "Bad Taste in Men" (男の趣味の悪さ, "Otoko no Shumi no Warusa"); 119. "Don't Fret Over It" (むずかしい顔すんなよ, "Muzukashii Kao Sunna yo"); 120. "Please Do That" (そうしてくれ, "Sōshitekure")
At the start of Ko's third year of high school, Aoba returns to practices with her leg still in a cast. When she and Azuma go home together, Nakanishi calls her hospital stay a boost to their relationship. In return for the kabuki play, Akane gives Akaishi and Ko mobile phone charms she made. When Aoba teaches Ko new breaking pitches, Azuma describes this as her way of climbing onto the mound at Koshien, using Ko's body. Akane starts working as a waitress at the Tsukishima's cafe. One night, Ko escorts her home, because she thinks that she is being followed by a stalker, who is actually interested in Aoba. In return for her coaching, Kō gives Aoba a garish t-shirt, which, to his surprise, she thanks him for. After Ichiyo agrees to marry Junpei Azuma if Seishu makes it to Koshien, he joins the team as an enthusiastic assistant coach. Akane tells Aoba that she was sickly as a child and envied active girls like her. When Junpei and Aoba scout Ryuō before the summer prefectural tournament, he asks what she thinks of Azuma but she cannot answer. For Ko's 18th birthday, both Akane and Aoba give him cake and he buys the scheduled, slightly expensive earrings for Wakaba.
14	11 March 2009	978-4-09-121635-9	10 April 2012 (Note: The seventh Viz Media omnibus volume contains the volumes 14 and 15 of the Japanese release.)	978-1-4215-3771-9
121. "It's Just the Truth" (ただの事実ですから, "Tada no Jijitsu Desukara"); 122. "Still Running" (まだ走ってるぞ, "Mada Hashiteruzo"); 123. "Who's That?" (誰だあいつ?, "Dare Da Aitsu?"); 124. "No-Name Schools and Informal Fools, Or, She'll Never Change..." (無名校と無礼講 (仮) 改め、あいかわらずだな..., "Mumeikō to Bureiko (han) Aratamu, Aikawarazu Da na..."); 125. "It's a Close Game" (接戦だよ, "Sessen Da yo"); 126. "He Looks Damn Happy" (いい顔してやがる, "Ii Kaoshite Yagaru"); 127. "Too Early!" (まだ早ーい!, "Mada Hayai!"); 128. "That's Best of All" (一番ですよ, "Ichiban Desu yo"); 129. "He's Pretty Special" (かなりなもんだよ, "Kanari na Mon Da yo"); 130. "That's Me, the Idiot" (バカですよーだ, "Baka Desu yō Da")
The brackets for the summer prefectural tournament are announced, which have Seishu meeting former head coach Daimon's current school in the second round. A younger player tells Ko that the team has gotten a lot better because of Aoba's influence and gets Ko to confirm that she and Azuma are not yet officially dating. As a result, various members of the team decided to ask out Aoba based on whether they perform well during Seishu's first game. Akane tells Aoba that she and Ko are a lot alike and that if she learns to love herself, she will be able to see what Wakaba saw in Ko. Seishu's first game is called after five innings, but only Ko makes his promised goal to Aoba by striking out 10 batters. Daimon's team plays Sena, an unknown school led by Miki, the player he drove off the Seishu team, and loses in a close game. Azuma tells Aoba that to understand her popularity, she needs to recognize her good points. In the game against Sena, Seishu gets on base several times, but fails to score through seven innings, while not allowing Sena any hits. Azuma tells Ko that Miki has not accounted for Aoba's influence on the younger Seishu players and in the bottom of the eighth, one of them hits a three-run homer. In the ninth, Miki hits a home run, preventing Ko from pitching a no-hitter. Seishu wins 3 to 1.
15	17 July 2009	978-4-09-121699-1	10 April 2012	978-1-4215-3771-9
Part 3: 131. "The Upper Range" (後半だよ, "Kōhan Da yo"); 132. "That's What I'm Saying" (こっちのセリフだろ!, "Kocchi no Serifu Daro!"); 133. "It Happens Sometimes!" (たまたまだよ!, "Tama Tama Da yo!"); 134. "He's About It" (...あいつだよ, "... Aitsu Da yo"); 135. "It Ain't Summer's Fault" (夏のせいじゃねえよ, "Natsu no Sei Janē yo"); *: 136. "I've Got a Bad Feeling About This" (やーな感じだなァ, "Yā na Kanji Da na"); 137. "You'd Be in the Way" (おまえは邪魔, "Omae wa Jama"); 138. "Couldn't Have Been More Clear" (バレバレだったよ, "Bare Bare Datta yo"); 139. "It Never Changes" (変わんねぇなあ, "Kawanne naa"); 140. "He's Always Been a Liar" (ウソつきだったよ, "Usotsuki Datta yo")
Seishu continues to advance in the tournament. Based on Aoba's coaching, Ko adjusts his form during his next game, which sacrifices control but gives him a speed near 160 km/h. Afterward, Ko tries to explain to reporters Aoba's importance even though she cannot play. Akane enters the hospital to be tested for an unspecified illness, which disturbs Akaishi's focus during Seishu's quarterfinal game. When he and Aoba visit the hospital after their win, Akane tells them that she promised to go on a date with Ko after the tournament and that she may require surgery. In the semifinal, Seishu faces Nishikura, a team that has come from behind to win every game by one run. Senda and Akaishi hit home runs as leadoff batters the first two innings and Nishikura scores one run in the first. In the eighth inning, with Nishikura having failed to get on base since the second inning, Seishu scores six runs and the game is called for Seishu, 8 to 1. After the game, Ko finally visits Akane in the hospital, where she tells him that her surgery will be on the morning of Seishu's final game against the heavily favored Ryuō and asks him not to tell it to Akaishi. Ko and Aoba visit Wakaba's grave together, where Ko prays that Akane's surgery goes well and Aoba tells him that Wakaba would forgive him if he went out with Akane. At practice, Aoba jokingly asks Azuma out to a movie. He accepts, saying he seriously likes her.
16	18 November 2009	978-4-09-121884-1	13 November 2012 (Note: The eighth Viz Media omnibus volume contains the volumes 16 and 17 of the Japanese release.)	978-1-4215-3772-6
141. "I Think So" (たぶん...な, "Tabun ... na"); 142. "That Comes Next, Right?" (今からだろ?, "Ima nara Daro?"); 143. "They Were Spectacular?" (見事でした?, "Migoto de Shita?"); 144. "I Already Have" (あきらめてるよ, "Akirameteru yo"); 145. "In the Blink of an Eye" (あっという間だよ, "Atto Iu Ma Da yo"); 146. "Oh, He's Right ..." (あ、本当だ..., "Ah, Honto Da ..."); 147. "This Is Your Chance to Shine" (見せ場だぞ, "Miseba Da zo"); 148. "He Made a Promise" (約束したんです, "Yakusoku Shitanda Desu"); 149. "Now I Remember" (思い出したぞ, "Omoidashita zo"); 150. "I Can't Recall" (記憶にないな, "Kioku ni Nai na")
The morning before the game, Aoba asks Ko if he loves Akane more than her. In response, he asks if he can lie. At the hospital, when Aoba hears the results of Akane's surgery, she tells Momiji by text message to give Ko a peace sign from the stands, to signal that it was successful. Ko tells Akaishi about the surgery and Aoba arrives at the stadium just in time for his first pitch in the bottom of the first inning. Ko consistently pitches over 150 km/h and retires all three batters with two strikeouts. In the second inning, the Ryuō pitcher walks Azuma, but strikes out the rest of the side, while against Ko, the Ryuō slugger, Mishima, gets on base by hitting a drag bunt. No other batters get on base in the first six innings except by walks. In the seventh inning, Azuma hits a single and is then batted in by Akaishi, a hit that Akane watches from her hospital room. At the bottom of the inning, Ko strikes out Mishima with a 158 km/h fastball, though Ko is disappointed he did not reach 160 km/h. In the bottom of the eighth, the Ryuō pitcher tries to repeat the previous year's line drive to Ko, but he catches it. At the bottom of the ninth, with two outs, Aoba describes Ko's composure as something she could not maintain, but rather part of Wakaba's personality. Ryuō scores before the third out, sending the game into extra innings, tied 1 to 1.
17	16 April 2010	978-4-09-122259-6; 978-4-09-159076-3 (w/art book)	13 November 2012	978-1-4215-3772-6
151. "He Was Crying" (泣いてたんだよ, Naitetan Da yo); 152. "I Agree" (同感だ, Dōkan Da); 153. "This Isn't Fair" (不公平だな, Fukōhei Da na); 154. "Don't Forget" (忘れるなよ, Wasureruna yo); 155. "Thanks." (よろしく。, Yorosiku.); 156. "And You?" (おまえは?, Omae wa?); 157. "Let's Settle This Like Men" (潔く行こうぜ, Isagiyoku Ikōze); 158. "Let's Make It Exciting" (盛り上げようぜ, Moriageyōze); 159. "I Know" (知ってるよ, Shitteru yo); 160. "More Than Anyone in the World" (世界中で一番, Sekaijū de Ichiban)
At the top of the 10th inning, Azuma hits a triple, after which Ryuō intentionally walks Akaishi and Ko, to load the bases with no outs. The last three players in Seishu's batting order are unable to hit, stranding the runners on base. As Seishu takes the field, Azuma warns Ko he should not let Mishima, Ryuō's first batter, get on base in any way or Ryuō will keep the momentum. Mishima hits a hard line drive to first that Azuma barely catches. In Aoba's bedroom, Mizuki finds a box of her diaries that were knocked over by the family cat, and from them learns that she never writes of anyone but Ko, whom she constantly insults. Ko retires the other two batters. In the top of the 12th inning with two outs, Ko hits a home run. In the bottom of the 12th, because Ko is tiring, Akaishi tells him to pitch all out to decide the game now. With two outs and a runner on first, Mishima comes to bat. After reaching a full count, Ko walks Mishima, and then strikes out the next player. Seishu wins, and as Ko celebrates, he remembers responding to Aoba's question before the game, saying that Seishu will go to Koshien and that he loves her. After the game he hugs Aoba, who slaps him then cries into his chest. In the final chapter, the morning before traveling to Koshien, Akaishi visits Akane as she recovers in the hospital, Nakanishi consoles Azuma for losing Aoba, and Aoba meets Ko at a cafe near the train station, where they talk about Wakaba's influence and then leave holding hands.

== See also ==
- List of Cross Game characters
- List of Cross Game episodes
