= Jang Min-hyeok =

South Korean voice actor

- Born: 장민혁; December 28, 1978 (age 47)
- Occupation: Voice actor
- Years active: 2006–present

Jang Min-hyeok (Korean: 장민혁; born December 28, 1978) is a South Korean voice actor. In 2006, he started his career by joining Korean Broadcasting System's voice acting division. After being a freelancer, Jang became popular with his cover of Shia LaBeouf on the Korean dub of Transformers and his role as Sherlock Holmes on the Korean dub of a British television series Sherlock.

== Roles ==
=== TV animation dubbing ===
- Avatar: The Legend of Korra (아바타: 코라의 전설, Korean TV Edition, Nickelodeon Korea) - Mako
- Black Butler (흑집사, Korean TV Edition, Anibox TV) - Drocell Kinds
- Bleach (블리치, Korean TV Edition, Animax)
  - Noba
  - Renji Abarai
- A Certain Magical Index (어떤 마술의 금서목록, Korean TV Edition, Animax)
  - Acqua of the Back
  - Etzali
  - Mitsuki Unabara
- Cross Game (크로스 게임, Korean TV Edition, EBS)
  - Mizuki Asami (named Seung-Ri Cheon on the Korean TV edition)
  - Shugo Daimon (named Do-Hoon Nam on the Korean TV edition)
- Fairy Tail (페어리 테일, Korean TV Edition, Champ TV) - Dranbalt/Mest Gryder
- Fish & Chips (피쉬 & 칩스, KBS) - Torpedo
- Gokujō!! Mecha Mote Iinchō (완소! 퍼펙트 반장, Korean TV Edition, Champ TV) - Ushio Toujou (named Woo-Jin Dong on the Korean TV edition)
- Gravity Falls
- Inazuma Eleven GO (썬더 일레븐 GO, Korean TV Edition, JEI TV) - Gōichi Kurumada (named Gang-Il Cha on the Korean TV edition)
- Inuyasha: The Final Act (이누야샤 완결편, Korean TV Edition, Champ TV) - Kaou
- Jewelpet (쥬얼펫, Korean TV Edition, JEI TV) - Seung-Woo Kang
- Jewelpet Twinkle (쥬얼펫 트윙클, Korean TV Edition, Daekyo Kids TV) - Pu-Reum Jeon
- Le Petit Prince (어린 왕자, Korean TV Edition, EBS) - The king on the episode "La Planète du Oiseau-Feu"
- My Friend Haechi (내 친구 해치, SBS) - Chocochip
- Ruler of Nabari (닌자의 왕, Korean TV Edition, Animax) - Kazuhiko Yukimi
- Olly the Little White Van (뛰뛰빵빵 올리, Korean TV Edition, EBS) - Royston
- Toradora! (토라도라!, Korean TV Edition, Animax) - Yūsaku Kitamura
- We Were There (우리들이 있었다, Korean TV Edition, Animax) - Masafumi Takeuchi

=== Animated movie dubbing ===
Year	Title	Role	Notes
2012	Inazuma Eleven GO: Kyūkyoku no Kizuna Gurifon (썬더 일레븐 GO 극장판: 궁극의 인연 그리폰)	Gouichi Kurumada (Kang-Il Cha)	
2012	Detective Conan: The Eleventh Striker (명탐정 코난 극장판: 열한 번째 스트라이커)	Kazumasa Nakaoka (Dong-Min Jang)	
2014	Frozen (2013 film) (겨울왕국)	Kristoff (크리스토프)	

=== Film dubbing ===
- Avatar (아바타, In-Flight Movie Edition) - One of the Na'vis
- Departures (굿바이, Korean TV Edition, KBS) - Tetta Sugimoto as Yamashita
- Harry Potter and the Order of the Phoenix (해리 포터와 불사조 기사단, Korean-dubbed edition in theaters) - Matthew Lewis as Neville Longbottom
- High School Musical (하이 스쿨 뮤지컬, Korean TV Edition, Disney Channel Korea)
  - Chris Warren Jr. as Zeke Baylor
  - Lucas Grabeel as Ryan Evans
- I Am Love (아이 엠 러브, Korean TV Edition, Channel A) - Mattia Zaccaro as Gianluca Recchi
- Indiana Jones and the Kingdom of the Crystal Skull (인디아나 존스: 크리스탈 해골의 왕국, Korean TV Edition, KBS) - Shia LaBeouf as Henry "Mutt Williams" Jones III
- Iron Man (아이언 맨, Korean TV Edition, KBS) - JARVIS (originally voiced by Paul Bettany)
- Letters to Juliet (레터스 투 줄리엣, Korean TV Edition, KBS) - Chris Egan as Charlie Wyman
- The Lincoln Lawyer (링컨 차를 타는 변호사, Korean TV Edition, KBS)
  - Josh Lucas as Ted Minton
  - Shea Whigham as DJ Corliss
- New York, I Love You (뉴욕 아이 러브 유, Korean TV Edition, KBS) - Shia LaBeouf as Jacob (on the "Shekhar Kapur" segment)
- Night of the Living Dead 3D (살아 있는 시체들의 밤, Korean TV Edition) - Sid Haig as Gerald Tovar, Jr.
- Ocean's Eleven (오션스 일레븐, Korean TV Edition, KBS) - Topher Grace as himself
- Princess Protection Program (프린세스 구출 대작전, Korean TV Edition, Disney Channel Korea) - Nicholas Braun as Edwin
- Transformers (트랜스포머, Korean TV Edition, KBS) - Shia LaBeouf as Sam Witwicky
- Transformers: Revenge of the Fallen (트랜스포머: 패자의 역습, Korean TV and streaming Edition, KBS and Amazon Prime) - Shia LaBeouf as Sam Witwicky
- The Twilight Saga: Eclipse (이클립스, Korean TV Edition, KBS)
  - Cameron Bright as Alec
  - Michael Welch as Mike Newton
  - Tyson Houseman as Quil Ateara

=== Foreign soap opera dubbing ===
- Cold Case (콜드 케이스, Korean TV Edition, KBS)
  - Ashton Holmes as Sean Morgan on the episode "Maternal Instincts"
  - Conor Dubin as Benny Rosen on the episode "Disco Inferno"
  - Jason Dohring as Dominic LaSalle on the episode "The Plan"
  - Patrick Macmanus as Daniel Holtz on the episode "A Time to Hate"
- Doctor Who 2008–10 specials (닥터 후 스페셜, Korean TV Edition, KBS) - David Ames as Nathan on the episode "Planet of the Dead"
- Falling Skies (폴링 스카이, Korean TV Edition, KBS) - Drew Roy as Hal Mason
- Good Luck Charlie (찰리야 부탁해, Korean TV Edition, Disney Channel Korea) - Jason Dolley as PJ Duncan
- Masked Rider Kiva (가면라이더 키바, Korean TV Edition, Champ TV) - Mitsu Murata as Bishop/The Swallowtail Fangire
- Sherlock (셜록, Korean TV Edition, KBS) - Benedict Cumberbatch as Sherlock Holmes
- Spirit Warriors (영혼의 전사들, Korean TV Edition, EBS) - Gilles Geary as Trix
- Three Kingdoms (삼국지, Korean TV Edition, KBS) - Fan Guan as Liu Qi

=== Video game dubbing ===
- Fighters Club (파이터스 클럽) - Jack
- League of Legends (리그 오브 레전드)
  - Ryze (The Rogue Mage)
  - Wukong (The Monkey King)
- MapleStory (메이플스토리)
  - Kaiser
  - Magnus
- Wendy's Adventures in Neverland (웬디의 네버랜드) - Starky Gabriel
- Tears of Themis (미해결사건부) - Artem Wing
- Genshin Impact (원신) - Kamisato Ayato
- Afterlife (애프터라이프) - Ghilley'
- Limbus Company (림버스 컴퍼니) - Dongrang
- Zenless Zone Zero (젠리스 존 제로) - Von Lycaon
- Cookie Run Kingdom (블랙사파이어맛 쿠키) - Black Sapphire Cookie

== Awards ==
=== KBS Radio Drama Awards ===
Year	Award	Result
2008	Best New Voice Actor	Won

== See also ==
- Korean Broadcasting System
