= Parks in Bowling Green, Kentucky =

This is a formatted table of Parks in Bowling Green, Kentucky.

	Baseball field(s)	Basketball court(s) (outdoor)	Batting cage(s)	Boat ramp	Concession stand(s)	Disc golf course	Golf holes	Grills	Historic site	Horseshoes	Picnic pavilion(s) and table(s)	Playground(s)	Public gardening plots	Soccer field(s)	Tennis court(s)	Volleyball court(s)	Walking/Running trail
C. W. Lampkin	Yes	Yes			Yes			Yes			Yes	Yes		Yes	Yes	Yes	
Chuck Crume Nature											Yes	Yes					Yes
Covington Woods	Yes	Yes			Yes		Yes	Yes			Yes	Yes			Yes	Yes	
Fort Webb									Yes								
Fountain Square									Yes								
H. P. Thomas								Yes				Yes		Yes		Yes	
Hobson Grove	Yes				Yes	Yes	Yes		Yes		Yes	Yes					
James Hines				Yes					Yes								
Lovers Lane					Yes	Yes					Yes	Yes		Yes			
Ogden																	
Pedigo	Yes	Yes	Yes		Yes						Yes	Yes				Yes	
Preston Miller					Yes	Yes					Yes	Yes				Yes	Yes
Reservoir Hill		Yes						Yes	Yes		Yes	Yes			Yes	Yes	
RiverWalk/Brownfield									Yes								Yes
Roland Bland		Yes						Yes		Yes	Yes	Yes		Yes	Yes	Yes	
Spero Kereiakes	Yes	Yes	Yes		Yes	Yes		Yes			Yes	Yes	Yes	Yes	Yes	Yes	Yes
Westside Neighborhood		Yes															
