= List of Cross Game characters =

Cross Game is a romantic comedy sports manga series written and illustrated by Mitsuru Adachi and published by Shogakukan. The series is about the high school baseball players Kou Kitamura and Aoba Tsukishima, who are bound together by Kou's relationship with Aoba's dead sister, Wakaba, and by their efforts to fulfill Wakaba's last dream of seeing them play in the national tournament in Koshien Stadium.

== Main characters ==
Kou Kitamura (樹多村 光, Kitamura Kō) Voiced by: Miyu Irino
Position: Pitcher
One of the two protagonists, Kou is in 5th grade in Part One and enters Seishu High School early in Part Two. He lives down the street from the Tsukishima family and frequently visits their house, batting cages, and coffee shop. He has been practically inseparable from Wakaba since their birth on the same day (June 10) in the same hospital. Despite their age in Part One, the two are very close and their families treat them as if they are a couple. While he shows little interest in baseball to outsiders, he has practiced daily at the Tsukishima Batting Center in the 60-mile-per-hour (97 km/h) cage and above since he was old enough to swing a bat; as a result, he is an excellent batter from a young age, especially against fastballs.
Kou is described by several other characters, including Ichiyo, Yuhei Azuma, and Junpei Azuma, as very like Aoba. In particular, they say the two are both very competitive, and Junpei attributes their frequent squabbling to their similarities. After a sandlot game against Aoba's team in elementary school, Kou is inspired by her pitching form to become a pitcher himself, and at Wakaba's urging secretly adopts Aoba's daily training regimen. Although he does not play baseball in junior high school, Akaishi and Nakanishi convince him to join the high school baseball team. With his changeup pitches, control, and incredible fastball, he becomes the ace pitcher in Seishu High School, as well as a strong hitter. Kou describes himself as having no self-confidence and an excellent liar.
In Part Three, Kou starts dating Akane Takigawa, who has a remarkable resemblance to Wakaba. However, he is also very attentive towards Aoba; for example noticing when Aoba is injured before anyone else and consoling her by catching her pitches when the realization that she would never be able to share important moments with her fellow teammates on the field, finally sinks in. Despite being at odds with one another, Kou and Aoba share a deep bond through their love for Wakaba. Kou takes to heart what Aoba has to say and values her opinion more than others. During the final Seishu's match against Ryuō, he shows great determination to throw a 100 mph pitch, having promised Aoba he would (based on Wakaba's advice on how to get Aoba to like him) telling her "We're going to Koshien! I'll pitch 100 mph ball! And I love Aoba Tsukishima more than anyone else in the world!' when playing catch with her before the match. Though he did ask if he could lie to her before replying, the first two are shown as true, implying the latter may also be true. This is further implied in the last chapter when Aoba holds his hand and he doesn't pull away when given the choice by her.

Aoba Tsukishima (月島 青葉, Tsukishima Aoba) Voiced by: Haruka Tomatsu
Position: Pitcher, Center fielder
The other protagonist, Aoba is the third daughter of the Tsukishima family, one year younger than Kou and Wakaba. Aoba is seen as a tomboy by other characters, one who loves baseball very much. Her father has played catch with Aoba since she was little, thus grooming her into a strong pitcher. She has a poster of Ryota Igarashi, a famous fastball pitcher, on her bedroom wall, and when she was young Aoba told Wakaba she was only interested in a guy who could pitch a fastball over 100 miles per hour (160 km/h). She has an excellent pitching form, on which Kou based his own form, and she has a wide variety of pitches. Although as a girl she cannot play in official inter-school games, she occasionally pitches in practice games, or plays center field when Kou pitches. Many younger members of the Seishu baseball team are inspired by how much effort she puts into baseball and coaching them, and work hard to not disappoint her. Kou claims she is secretly disappointed that she will never be able to pitch in an official game, and Yuhei Azuma points out that she is using Kou as her proxy to get to Koshien.
Aoba is very close to Wakaba, and according to Ichiyo jealous of how much time Wakaba spends with Kou. She frequently reiterates her intense dislike of Kou throughout the series and often squabbles with him. Despite this, she is very like him in behavior and talents, as several characters comment. After Kou becomes the ace pitcher of Seishu High School, Aoba slowly comes to admit his qualities as a player, and becomes less reluctant to offer advice and even teaches him new breaking pitches. Eventually she admits she has faith in his ability to fulfill Wakaba's last dream, in which he pitches at Koshien.
Late in Part Two, Aoba admits (lightly) to Junpei Azuma that she likes his younger brother Yuhei and is aware of Yuhei's feelings for her, although she finds it hard to reciprocate those feelings. She is often teased about her similarities with Kou in their behaviors and habits. Even with this and her constant arguing with Kou; at times she finds herself moved by his abilities, spirit, and love for her late sister. But she is always reminded of Wakaba's words that even if Kou becomes a man that Aoba would like, that she still can't take him from her. She often reiterates that she 'hates' Kou however after Seishu's victory over Ryuuou she ponders over their conversation before the match, where he told her that Seishu would reach Koshien and that he 'loves' her. Ichiyo also comments that Wakaba and Kou, were the only people who could make Aoba cry, after Aoba cries in Kou's arms knowing Seishu made it to Koshien. In the last chapter she seems far less hostile towards Kou and finally comes to terms with her 'hatred' of him, realising that he was the only other person, besides herself, that truly felt the loss of Wakaba, something she had been trying to deny ever since. She openly holds hands with him at the end, and tells him that if he dislikes it that he can let go, which he doesn't. Despite this, she cryptically thinks to herself that she still hates him and that she can't stand him 'more than anyone else in the world.' Aoba's name means "green leaf" or "fresh leaf".

== Seishu High School ==
Osamu Akaishi (赤石 修, Akaishi Osamu) Voiced by: Kenji Nomura
Position: Catcher
Akaishi is a childhood friend of Kou and Wakaba, the same age as them, whose father owns a liquor/sake store in the neighborhood. In Part One, he has a crush on Wakaba and is jealous of Kou. In elementary school, is able to throw a 60 mph fastball but is thrown out of Little League for fighting with opposing teams. After Wakaba's death, Akaishi switches to catcher to fulfill Wakaba's last dream in which Kou pitches to him at Koshien. At the start of high school, he refuses to take Coach Daimon's placement test and is placed on the portable team with Kou, and plans the boys' strategy to get rid of Daimon. Kou describes Akaishi as a brilliant catcher and is holding the cleanup hitter position in the second match with the regulars then he was positioned in the 5th batter in the batting order, and according to Aoba, Akaishi is one of the few people able to catch her pitches at full power. Coach Maeno sometimes consults with him over game strategy, and makes Akaishi the team captain during his third year. He is greatly shocked when he meets Akane Takigawa because of her resemblance to Wakaba, and while he has feelings for her, he actively works to bring her and Kou together.
Daiki Nakanishi (中西 大気, Nakanishi Daiki) Voiced by: Yoshinori Sonobe
Position: First baseman, Third baseman
Nakanishi is a childhood friend of Kou, the same age as him and Akaishi. At the start of the series, he is described by Kou as the second-best fighter in their grade, and in high school Nakanishi makes occasional comments about restraining his temper. He is depicted as stocky, and Coach Maeno sometimes asks manager Ōkubo to make sure he loses weight. Nakanishi likes Kou, but has a rocky relationship with him after Kou feigns interest in baseball to convince his sandlot team to buy new equipment from Kitamura Sports. Nakanishi joins the baseball club in junior high school, but quits after a few months after getting into a fight with some seniors. However, he keeps training afterward, and when he discovers in their third year of junior high that Kou has been secretly practicing pitching, Nakanishi forces him to learn the other basics of baseball. In return for Akaishi taking over Kou's training, Nakanishi joins the baseball club in high school; like Kou and Akaishi he is placed on the portable team for not taking Coach Daimon's placement test, and with them plots to get rid of Daimon. He plays catcher in elementary school; in high school, he initially plays first base before switching to third base to make way for Azuma, and he is the 3rd batter in the batting order. Partway through high school, he begins dating his classmate, Kyoko Nakagawa, from the track and field club.
Yuhei Azuma (東 雄平, Azuma Yūhei) Voiced by: Takahiro Sakurai
Position: First baseman
Younger brother of Junpei Azuma, in the same year as Kou. Yuhei was recruited to Seishu High School from another part of Tokyo by Coach Daimon for his varsity team. He is an excellent slugger, and bats as cleanup hitter. He has trouble recalling other people's names and faces, claiming that he only remembers people worth worrying about, but he remembers Kou from a single encounter at the Tsukishima batting cages. By the end of his first summer at Seishu, he loses his confidence in Coach Daimon, and refuses to play in the second scrimmage against the portable team. After Daimon is sacked, Azuma stays at Seishu (and begins boarding with the Kitamuras) because he believes Kou's abilities are his best chance of playing in Koshien.
Yuhei's obsession with reaching Koshien comes from guilt towards his brother Junpei, whose baseball career was cut off by injuring himself while saving Yuhei from falling down a staircase. As a result, Yuhei is shown as being sensitive about children playing around stairs and other situations where a person's recklessness affects other people. Because of his Koshien obsession, he is initially perceived as cold and uncaring towards people around him. Over the course of the series, as his brother's happy demeanor becomes more sincere, Yuhei comes to enjoy the game more, focusing more on performance than outcome, and making friends among his teammates. During Part Two, he develops a romantic interest in Aoba, and early in Part Three seriously accepts her joking offer of a date. Though he himself has feelings for Aoba, he often does things to bring Kou and Aoba together such as asking Aoba to massage Kou's back after practice, and nudging Kou to hug Aoba 'for all he's worth' after they reach Koshien.
Keiichiro Senda (千田 圭一郎, Senda Keiichirō) Voiced by: Daisuke Kishio
Position: Shortstop
A member of the Seishu baseball team, in the same year as Kou. Senda claims to be a lady's man, and constantly pursues Aoba as well as other girls. He is the only non-recruit to pass Coach Daimon's placement test, and is placed on the varsity team as a pitcher. Because of this, during his first semester he frequently brags about how good he must be. Coach Maeno comments that Senda is too much of a showoff to be a good pitcher but would be a good "flashy shortstop". After making too many errors as pitcher during the first scrimmage between the varsity and portable teams, he is demoted to the portable team, where Maeno substitutes him as shortstop. After Coach Daimon is fired, Senda becomes the starting shortstop and leadoff batter. In his third year of high school, he becomes impressed by Aoba's hard work and begins taking practice more seriously.
Sentaro Maeno (前野 千太郎, Maeno Sentarō) Voiced by: Minoru Inaba
Position: Coach
Head coach of Seishu baseball team. Because he has coached Seishu for so long, he has a lot of influence with other coaches in the region but is known as a lenient coach who prioritizes enjoying the game over winning. Just before Kou enters high school, Maeno is demoted to coaching the portable team when Interim Principal Shido hires Coach Daimon as head coach. Due to the clash with Coach Daimon, Maeno becomes motivated to win, turning into a stricter coach, and leads the portable team to victory in their rematch scrimmage against Daimon's varsity team. After coach Daimon is fired, Maeno is reinstated as the head coach. He is depicted as a canny coach with a great knowledge of baseball.
Makihara (巻原) Voiced by: Daisuke Endō
Position: Third baseman
A member of the portable team of the Seishu baseball team, two years ahead of Kou. He did not get along with Nakanishi in junior high, and pushed him around. He is jealous of Kou's abilities and lets it affect how he plays. He retires after the first scrimmage against the varsity team.
Sekiguchi (関口) Voiced by: Kōzō Dōzaka
Position: Second baseman
A member of the portable team of the Seishu baseball team, two years ahead of Kou. Like Makihara, Sekiguchi didn't get along with Nakanishi in junior high. He retires after the first scrimmage against the varsity team.
Tsuneki (常木) Voiced by: Kyōsuke Suzuki
Position: Center fielder
A member of the portable team of the Seishu baseball team, two years ahead of Kou. Tsuneki also didn't get along with Nakanishi in junior high. He retires after the first scrimmage against the varsity team.
Toshio Miya (宮 俊男, Miya Toshio)
Position: Left fielder
A member of the portable team of the Seishu baseball club, one year ahead of Kou. Miya is an excellent bunter and very good at squeeze plays as well fielding. His playing helps keep the varsity team from allowing too many runs during their scrimmages. After Daimon is fired, he is promoted to team captain, and he is the 2nd batter in the batting order.
Wataru Morinaka (森中 渡, Morinaka Wataru)
Position: Third baseman, Center fielder
A member of the baseball club, one year ahead of Kou. After the third-year players quit after the first scrimmage, he becomes starting third baseman for the rematch scrimmage. After Nakanishi switches positions to third base, he becomes the center fielder in the team, and took up the 8th batter in the batting order.
Satoshi Takada (高田 智史, Takada Satoshi)
Position: Second baseman
A member of the baseball club, one year ahead of Kou. After the third-year players quit, he becomes starting second baseman during the rematch scrimmage, and he is the 7th batter in the batting order. Takada is a pull hitter.
Tetsu Iwai (岩井 哲, Iwai Tetsu)
Position: Right fielder
A member of the baseball club, one year ahead of Kou. After the third-year players quit, he becomes a starting player (right fielder) during the rematch practice game between the varsity and portable teams, and he is the 8th batter in the batting order.
Hiroko Ōkubo (大久保 博子, Ōkubo Hiroko) / "Tubby" (デーブ, Dēbu) Voiced by: Mami Kameoka
Position: Manager
Manager of the portable team, in the same year as Kou. Despite being called "Tubby" by some of the players, she has a kind heart and is a very hard worker. Like Risa Shido, she is also a former foreign exchange student, but unlike Risa, she is humble and down-to-earth. She is the granddaughter of the Seishu board chairman, but never takes advantage of that fact. She is named after Hiromoto "Dave" Ōkubo, a former Japanese and U.S. baseball catcher and coach.
Risa Shido (志堂 理沙, Shidō Risa) Voiced by: Yuka Hirata
Position: Manager
Manager of the varsity team under Coach Daimon, one year ahead of Kou, and daughter of the stand-in principal. She is a former foreign exchange student who recently returned to Japan. As she has little interest in baseball and considers herself to be above the players, she does not do any work and treats the team (especially the portable members) as her personal servants. During the second scrimmage between the varsity and portable teams, she is on a vacation in Europe. When the regular principal returns, she begins working at her mother's boutique. After she successfully passes an audition for a role in a TV drama, she quits the baseball team altogether and sets up her own fans club in school. However, she is shown to have regrets for never doing anything useful for the team as a manager.
Yokomichi Ōkubo (大久保 横道, Ōkubo Yokomichi) Voiced by: Mugihito
Chair of the Seishu High School board and Hiroko Ōkubo's grandfather. He is a regular customer at Akaishi's father's sake store and occasionally meets Momiji in the park. According to Hiroko, he is a very stubborn and always keeps his promises. During the first scrimmage between the varsity and portable teams, he watches the game with Aoba. At the rematch, he enforces the agreement that the losing team be dissolved and their coach fired, and after the game also fires Interim Principal Shido for financial mismanagement.

== Tsukishima family ==
Wakaba Tsukishima (月島 若葉, Tsukishima Wakaba) Voiced by: Akemi Kanda
Second daughter of the Tsukishima family, she is in fifth grade in Part One. She and Kou share the same birthday and were born in the same hospital. She treats Kou as her boyfriend, whom she sometimes kisses on the cheek, to the annoyance of their mutual friend Akaishi. Kou and Wakaba celebrate their birthdays together by exchanging presents. To help Kou, who has trouble choosing what to get her, after their eleventh birthday she makes a schedule of gifts for the next nine years, culminating with an engagement ring for her twentieth birthday. Wakaba tells Aoba that if Kou puts his mind to it, he could become the greatest pitcher in all of Japan; after his sandlot team loses to Aoba's, Wakaba makes him take up her sister's training routine, so that he can beat her. Soon after this, Wakaba accidentally drowns while saving a younger girl at swimming camp. After her death, Kou continues to follow both the training routine and the schedule of birthday presents into high school.
Before leaving for swimming camp, Wakaba tells Aoba and Akaishi her dream from the night before. In it, Wakaba is watching from the stands of Koshien as Ko pitches, Akaishi catches, and Aoba plays center field. To fulfill this dream, Akaishi switches from pitching to catching, and Aoba eventually comes to trust that Kou can make it come true. Wakaba's name means "young leaf".

Seiji Tsukishima (月島 清次, Tsukishima Seiji) Voiced by: Yasuhiko Kawazu
Owner of the Tsukishima Batting Center and attached Clover Cafe coffee shop, and father of Ichiyo, Wakaba, Aoba, and Momiji. A widower whose wife died some time before the story begins, he is a nice but worldly man. During high school, he was the second-string catcher of a baseball team that went to Koshien, although he did not play there, and he coached Aoba's pitching since she was young.
Ichiyo Tsukishima (月島 一葉, Tsukishima Ichiyō) Voiced by: Megumi Toyoguchi
Oldest daughter of the Tsukishima family. At the start of Part Two, she is in her second year of college. She has run the Tsukishima household since her mother's death when she was in junior high school, acting as a surrogate mother for her sisters. Ichiyo works in the Clover Cafe as well, as waitress and cook. In Part Two, she begins dating Junpei Azuma and tells Kou, whom she treats as a younger brother, that Junpei is the first boyfriend she has been serious about. At the start of Kou's third year of high school, Ichiyo tells Junpei she will marry him if the Seishu Team goes to Koshien, but admits to Kou that she plans to marry him regardless. Her name means "first leaf".
Momiji Tsukishima (月島 紅葉, Tsukishima Momiji) Voiced by: Noriko Shitaya
Fourth and youngest daughter of the Tsukishima family. She is in kindergarten during Part One, and in fifth grade at the start of Part Two. Although she lost her mother at a very young age, she has a happy, energetic, and outgoing personality. Despite their difference in ages, Momiji and Kou have a friendly, sibling-like relationship, and she catches for him when he practices pitching. When she once plays catch with Aoba, Aoba apologizes for throwing the ball too hard and Momiji says, to Aoba's surprise, she is used to it as Kou throws harder. Momiji grows up to resemble her older sister Wakaba, which shocks Akaishi the first time he meets her. Like Wakaba, she is interested in swimming, and in the sixth grade breaks one of her older sister's swimming records. Her name means "maple leaf" or "crimson leaf".
Mizuki Asami (朝見 水輝, Asami Mizuki) Voiced by: Tetsuya Kakihara
Aoba's cousin, the same age as her. Mizuki's father, Isamu Asami, is a younger brother of the Tsukishima sisters' mother and a world-renowned mountain climber. As a result of his father's travels, Mizuki has been raised overseas most of his life, and is an excellent climber. He returns to Japan to attend high school, living with the Tsukishimas and enrolling in Seishu at the same time as Aoba. He is popular with girls but he claims to be interested in only Aoba. He initially sees Kou as his rival for Aoba, and frequently mentions that Kou does not yet pitch 100 mph, but he comes to recognize Yuhei Azuma as a rival as well. He is in the mountaineering club at school, which he uses as a cover for his own activities as the club activities are below his skills. He is often depicted free climbing tall structures, such as poles and school buildings, without equipment.
Nomo (ノモ) Voiced by: Masako Nozawa
The Tsukishima's black-and-white cat. He appears in the background throughout the series. He is named after Hideo Nomo.

== Others ==
Shugo Daimon (大門 秀悟, Daimon Shugo) Voiced by: Tōru Furusawa
Position: Coach
A nationally renowned high school baseball coach, having taken teams to Koshien several times, winning it twice. He is hired by Interim Principal Shido, replacing Coach Maeno in the process, to build up Seishu's baseball team. He recruits his own players from around the country, including Azuma and Miki, to create a varsity team, relegating the existing baseball club to a second-string squad called the portable or farm team—which he calls a "cesspool". He is depicted as proud and rigid: Senda tells the rest of the portable team there is no chance of being promoted back to varsity, because that would require Daimon to admit he made a mistake, and Miki is demoted to the bench for disobeying a direct order to make a play. Akaishi criticizes Daimon for using up players in order to win, noting that despite his career record, none of his former players have succeeded as pros. During the rematch scrimmage with the portable team, Daimon refuses to acknowledge that Kou has become a better pitcher, that his team needs Miki, or that he must change his set coaching strategy. After losing the scrimmage, Daimon is forced to resign along with Shido. He then becomes head coach for Kurokoma Jitsugyō, employing the same talent-buying strategy he used in Seishu, where he loses in the first round of the regional tournament because he refuses to take Miki's team seriously.
Eitaro Shido (志堂 英太郎, Shidō Eitaro) Voiced by: Jirō Saitō
Father of Risa and Interim Principal of Seishu while the current principal is on medical leave. He hires Coach Daimon to increase the school's profile by going to Koshien while he is in charge. He repeatedly states that, like his daughter, he has no interest in baseball itself but is only concerned with the prestige that comes with Koshien. After Daimon's team loses to the portable team, he is transferred to another school by Chairman Ōkubo following revelations of fiscal mismanagement. In the manga, his background is not given; in the anime, he is a former student counselor.
Tatsumasa Miki (三木 竜正, Miki Tatsumasa) Voiced by: Hiromu Miyazaki
Position: Center Fielder, Pitcher
One of Coach Daimon's recruits. He is an excellent batter and plays in center field. He tells Azuma that he came to Seishu as much to play with him as with Daimon. During the regional tournament during his first year of high school, he defies Daimon's orders to make a correct play and is demoted to bench-warmer. After the subsequent fallout with Coach Daimon, he transfers to Sena Municipal High School, which is not known for baseball, telling Azuma he wants to play "fun" ball. At Sena, he becomes ace pitcher and cleanup batter, as well as acting as a player-coach, since the baseball club did not have a proper coach. His third year of high school, Miki leads Sena victory over Daimon's new school, Kurokoma Jitsugyō, in the regional tournament, only to lose to Seishu in the second round.
Junpei Azuma (東 純平, Azuma Junpei) Voiced by: Mitsuaki Madono
Position: Assistant Coach
Older brother of Yuhei Azuma, several years older than he is, Junpei was a star pitcher and cleanup batter in high school, who was being scouted by pro teams during his last year of school. His team was on the verge of winning the regional finals when he sustained a career-stopping leg injury while saving Yuhei from falling down a staircase, and he quit baseball and now runs a small produce distributor. He is depicted as cheerful and feckless, but Yuhei claims initially his cheerfulness is forced; Kou describes Junpei as unreliable, in part because he never follows through on his promise to find Yuhei an apartment. Upon meeting Ichiyo, the summer of Kou's second year of high school, Junpei immediately starts courting her, and they eventually start going out. In Kou's third year, Ichiyo promises to marry him if Seishu makes it to Koshien, and Junpei becomes an assistant coach for Seishu's baseball team, enthusiastically cheering the team on because his wedding is riding on it.
Akane Takigawa (滝川 あかね, Takigawa Akane) Voiced by: Akemi Kanda
A girl the same age as Kou with an uncanny resemblance to Wakaba Tsukishima as she would be if she had lived. Her parents open a soba restaurant across the street from Kitamura Sporting Goods the summer of Kou's second year of high school. She is an excellent artist, and won the grand prize of the Koshien Poster Art Competition using Aoba as the model for a pitcher. She is enrolled in Seisen Private Girl's Academy. Akane becomes a waitress at Coffee Clover because she does not get paid working at her parents' restaurant, and becomes close to Aoba, telling her she always wanted a younger sister. Akane has suffered from an unknown disease since childhood, and the summer of her third year of high school is admitted into the hospital for tests leading to surgery. She promises Kou she will go out with him after she is discharged. This is later forgotten as she sacrifices her own feelings towards Kou and helps Aoba show her feelings as well. It is shown that she shows kindness towards Akaishi.
Kensaku Kitamura (樹多村 健作, Kitamura Kensaku) Voiced by: Takuma Suzuki
Kou's father, owner of Kitamura Sporting Goods. He is a fan of the Tokyo Yakult Swallows baseball team.
Kimie Kitamura (樹多村 君江, Kitamura Kimie) Voiced by: Kyoko Hikami
Kou's mother. Aoba loves her korokke, and visits the Kitamuras to obtain them despite Ko's presence.

== See also ==
- List of Cross Game chapters
- List of Cross Game episodes
