= Cricket nets =

Equipment used for cricket practice

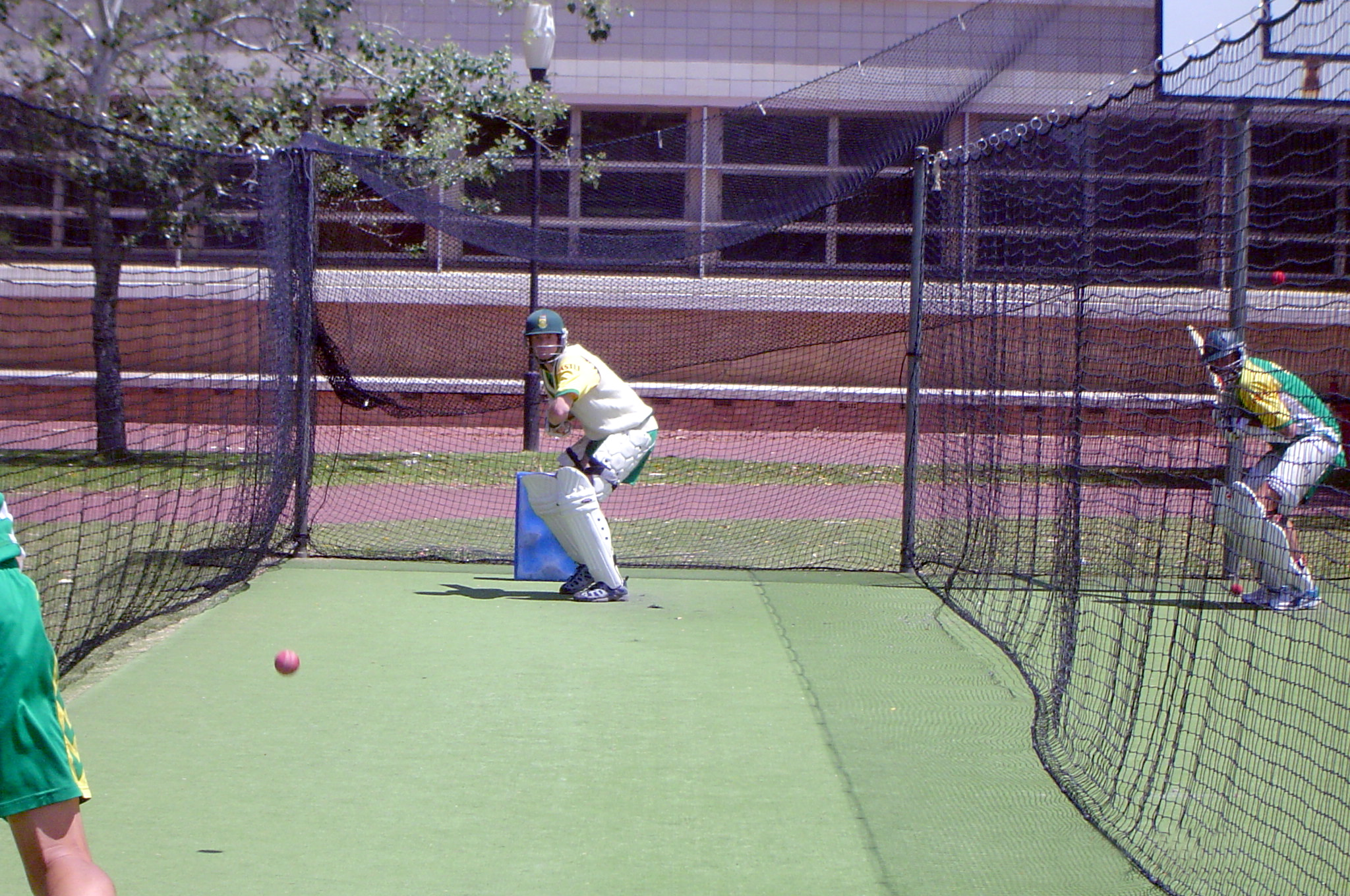
Shaun Pollock batting in the nets at the University of Western Australia

Cricket nets are used by batters and bowlers to practice their cricketing techniques. They consist of a cricket pitch (natural or artificial) enclosed by netting on either side, behind, and optionally above. The bowling end is left open.

Nets stop the cricket ball travelling across the field when the batter plays a shot. They save practice time and eliminate the need for fielders or a wicket-keeper. They allow more people to train at once, particularly when they have several lanes. They allow solitary batting practice when used with a bowling machine.

== Use ==
Nets are fundamental to cricket practice and are used at every level of the game. Professional cricket clubs are likely to have over 10 lanes of nets, and be able to practice both indoors and outdoors. Nets are also very prevalent in educational establishments, as they allow safe and efficient training with a high volume of pupils when there are significant time constraints. Keen cricketers may have nets in their gardens.

Nets helps safe practice. By containing most aerial cricket balls, they reduce the potential for injury of bystanders. However, the nets need an opening for the bowler, so it is still common for balls to leave the nets, and shouts of heads up are commonly heard.

== Types ==
Indoor and outdoor cricket nets differ significantly.

=== Indoor ===
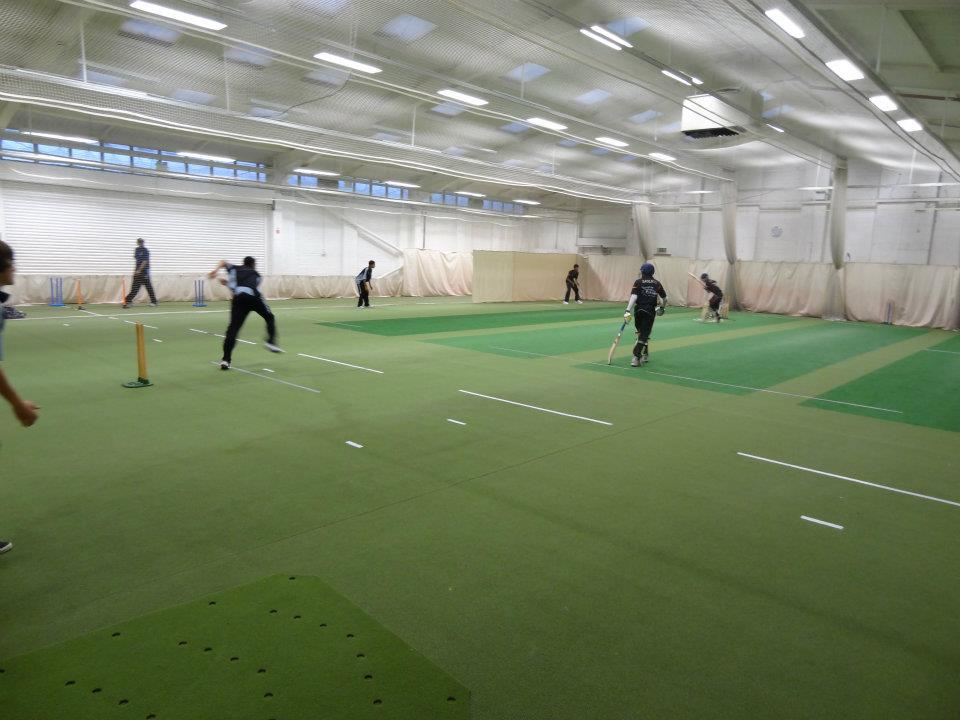
Indoor cricket nets

Indoor nets are often suspended on a track (runner) fixed to the ceiling of the sports hall or gymnasium. The nets can drop 4–8 metres to the ground, and be over 20 metres long. Indoors nets are commonly multi-lane, with two- or four-lane nets being particularly common.

Indoor nets tend to be white. They have separate 3-metre-high canvas screens that enclose the area immediately surrounding the batsman, for two reasons. First, the netting near the batsman has by far the highest work rate, and canvas is significantly more durable than mesh netting, so screens improves the nets' lifespan. Second, the batsman is less likely to be distracted.

Indoor nets can be suspended on runners, providing a curtain system where they can be pulled in and out of use. This allows the sports facility to be flexible in its use.

=== Outdoor ===
Outdoor nets are the most common form of practice nets. They take many forms, with some being homemade whilst others are professional manufactured and installed. The design and construction of outdoor nets tends to be based around two factors: the frequency and age of those who will use them, and the available space. In schools and cricket clubs where use will be high, construction will be tailored to that. The nets may also need safeguards against misuse or vandalism. Therefore, the frame is often constructed out of heavy-duty galvanised steel tube with an overall diameter ranging from 34 to 50 mm. The tube is then joined by key-clamp brackets. This system requires permanent concrete ground sockets, but the actual frame of the cage can still be dismantled and removed. Outdoor nets can be fitted with wheels to be completely mobile.

There are variations in the design of outdoor nets such as use of pulley system where the netting is mounted on a cable that spans posts located at either end. Garden nets are frequently home-made, often to a professional design with locally sourced components. This saves money, and cricket nets have a simple design and purpose, so are not difficult to make. Nets should be no less than 9 ft wide, with 12 ft being optimum. If the nets are under 24 ft long, they should be at least 9 ft high; if under 36 ft long, at least 10 ft high; and 12 ft high if longer than that. This prevents balls ending up on the roof of the nets when bowled. The length is less critical, but the longer the safer.

== Netting ==
Netting is the most important component. The netting twine is usually made of a synthetic polymer such as polyethylene, which is hardwearing and relatively cheap. Before about 1995, nets were often made from nylon, but this became too expensive. Nets are often black, green or white. The mesh gap is usually 50 mm and the twine will commonly have a diameter of 1.8 to 3.0 mm. Netting may be knotless or knotted: knotted is considered superior. The breaking strength of knotted netting is higher for the same diameter twine. Good twine will be UV stabilized and rot proof. For home-made nets, netting is the only specialist supply.

Netting is seamed at its edges to prevent fraying. The seam is usually a 6 mm cord sewn into the netting where it meets a cage or end. Canvas blinkers can be added to offer privacy and to reduce wear. Also, partial canvas skirts of 0.5 m can be added to the bottom to prevent damage from wild animals.

== In other sports ==
The baseball equivalent is the batting cage, though fundamentally different, as that provides complete ball containment, whereas cricket nets do not.

== See also ==
- Cricket clothing and equipment
