= Bowling machine =

Machine used for Cricket practice

In cricket, a bowling machine is a device which enables a batter to practise (usually in the nets) and to hone specific skills through repetition of the ball being bowled at a certain length, line and speed. It can also be used when there is no-one available to bowl, or no one of the desired style or standard.

There are a number of different types of bowling machine available to cricket coaches, each quite different in the ways they achieve the required delivery, though most allow the use of remote control, so that a coach can be closer to a batsman when the stroke is played.

Ball-throwing machines for cricket have been used for over a century and originally followed a more slingshot design, which later gave way to motorised wheels and programmable machines.

== Mechanical bowling machines ==
This type of machine is by far the most common.

=== How they work ===
The main mechanism of the machine consists of two heavy wheels, between 30 and 50 cm in diameter, fitted with solid or pneumatic rubber tyres, each driven by its own electric motor. These are mounted in a frame such that the wheels are in the same plane, about 7 cm apart (slightly less than the diameter of a cricket ball). A ball joint allows the machine a wide range of movement. The whole assembly is mounted on a sturdy tripod or other frame so that the plane of the wheels is roughly at the height that a typical bowler would release the ball. A chute delivers the ball between the wheels, protecting the coach's hands.

The motors are typically powered by a car battery, and turn in opposite directions. A controller allows variation of the speed of each wheel, allowing the machine to be slowed down for less experienced batsmen, or when the motors are not running at the same speed, swing or spin bowling can be simulated.

These machines will work with any ball of roughly the right size and weight, such as normal cricket balls or tennis balls. However, they usually work best with their own balls, bowling machine balls which are made of hard plastic, and are covered in dimples. These dimples are to help the spinning wheels grip the ball and, for example, improve the swing or spin of deliveries when those types of deliveries are desired.

=== Simulating different deliveries ===
==== Fast bowling ====
This is achieved by setting both wheels to the same speed, as fast as the batsman is able to deal with, although the machine itself would have to be tipped horizontally. The coach can move the machine around slightly to vary the line and length of each ball.

==== Swing bowling ====
The plane of the wheels is flat, and the motors are set to run at slightly different speeds. This means the ball will spin about an axis perpendicular to the ground, causing it to swing due to the Magnus effect. If the ball is spinning anticlockwise (looking from above) the ball will swing from right to left; clockwise spin results in a swing from left to right. This means that if the coach slows down the wheel on one side, ball will swing in that direction. The swing produced in this way is different from normal swing bowling, however – it is much more like a curling ball in football.

==== Spin bowling ====
To achieve spin, old style bowling machines should be tilted to one side, and the wheels set to different speeds as per swing bowling. It will also probably be necessary to make the machine bowl significantly more slowly. The combined action of the spin imparted by the wheels, and the non-perpendicular axis of that spin will cause the ball to bounce up at an angle.

==== Seam bowling ====
This is difficult to achieve since the operator cannot control exactly how the ball will roll into the machine and between the wheels. However, by the law of averages, a ball will occasionally come out with its seam at the correct angle, and bounce unpredictably as a result.

==== Bouncers ====
To get balls that bounce unnaturally high or low, the plane of the machine must be set so that it is vertical. Not all machines can do this, simply because their ball joint doesn't give the required range of movement. To get balls that bounce higher than normal, the lower wheel should spin slightly faster than the upper. Deliveries that bounce much lower than normal are less common and are usually the result of the ball striking a broken-up patch of ground. These balls can still be simulated, however, by increasing the speed of the upper wheel.

== Pneumatic bowling machines ==
This design is significantly less common than the mechanical type and operates using a completely different principle.

=== How they work ===
Most of the space in the machine is a hopper that contains the balls. At the bottom of the hopper, near the front, is a rotor with space for six balls. The balls slot into the spaces on the rotor by gravity, which then takes them into the innards of the mechanism. The rotor passes over a trap-door, which the ball opens with its weight, falling into a small chamber.

A pump is used to provide a flow of air into the chamber that the ball drops into. The airflow pushes the ball along the chamber to rubber ring, or gasket, known as a "restrictor". The restrictor has a hole through it that is sightly smaller than the ball, which the ball presses up against. This seals the hole, so air pressure builds up in the chamber. When the pressure is so great that the restrictor can no longer hold it, the ball bursts through, out of the main body of the machine and into an external tube, which guides it upwards and releases it at the height of a bowler's arm.

=== Simulating different deliveries ===
==== Fast bowling ====
A system exists that allows air to escape from the barrel shortly after it has passed the restrictor. This reduces the pressure on the ball, reducing its muzzle velocity. Closing this increases the speed to its maximum; its maximum speed is 160+ km/h (100+ mph).

==== Swing bowling ====
To do this a curved piece of tubing is attached to the end of the barrel. The ball rolls around this causing it to spin and swing.

==== Spin bowling ====
The tubing used for swing bowling can also be used for spin bowling, by pointing the curve somewhere between vertical and horizontal.

==== Seam bowling ====
Seam bowling is impossible on this machine as it only accepts tennis balls and cricket training balls such as Slazenger's "Slazball" (a hard, small, low-bounce, heavy ball, similar in appearance to a tennis ball but usually red in colour). Neither of these types of ball has a seam.

==== Bouncers ====
The tubing can again be used, this time to simulate high and low bounce by mounting the tube vertically.

== Programmable bowling machines ==
Both of the types of machines described above are fairly simple designs, intended for regular, hard use by clubs, and hence are simple to operate and reliable. They can only simulate one type of delivery with the machine in a given configuration and have other limitations, particularly with spin bowling, which limit their usefulness to players at the highest levels of the game.

Programmable bowling machines are intended to overcome some of these limitations by rapidly re-configuring themselves to bowl different types of delivery in quick succession.

A programmable bowling machine called "Merlyn", which its makers claimed could "bowl any ball known to man" received much public attention when it was used by the English cricket team in the run-up to and during the 2005 Ashes series.

Originally a one-off, Merlyn was built by Henry Pryor, a cricket coach in Herefordshire. Its mechanism has not been publicly revealed, though it is safe to assume it is much more complex than the other machines. Unlike the old two-wheeled bowling machines, the "Merlyn" bowling machine, can deliver spin without the head of the machine being tilted.

Crucially, the machine was claimed to be able to emulate Shane Warne's leg breaks, and although he is dismissive of its usefulness, the England batsmen disagree, and consider their ability to play spin bowling significantly improved.

The machine, as well as its mechanical abilities, also has significant elements of computer-control built in. It is claimed that it can reproduce an over from a particular bowler if fed the correct data.

One of the more unnerving aspects of the machine is that it provides no indication of the type of ball it is about to bowl until the ball has left the machine. This forces batsmen to work on their instinctive batting, rather than trying to second guess the bowler.

There has been some other advances in technology in the 20 years since Merlyn appeared, including three-wheeled machine and video projection of a bowler onto the machine, such as used earlier with baseball machines. Loughborough University demonstrated visual feedback by showing a representation of the bowler projected onto a screen in 2006. The ball would be released as the virtual bowler's hand reaches the hole from which the ball is released. It is not clear whether they were able to go into production or commercialise their technology.

In the winter of 2009/10 the ECB acquired 20 of the "Merlyn" machines, one for each county and two for the performance centre at Loughborough. The machines were produced were produced as joint project between Merlyn and a company called Bola.

In the last decade, these bowling machines have been used as a core product in the production of sports simulators for multiple sports like cricket, baseball, tennis, etc. Sports simulators are a more visual and user-friendly version of bowling machines and enable anyone to sport sports.

== See also ==
- Cricket clothing and equipment
- Pitching machine
