= Pitching machine =

Training device in baseball and softball

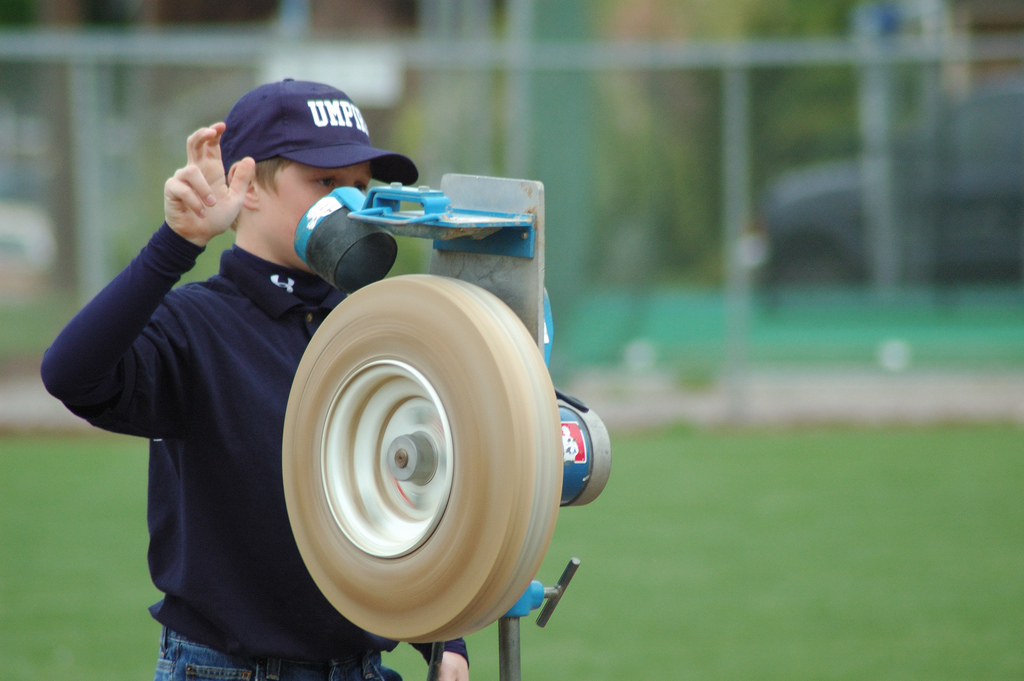
A hand-fed circular wheel-type pitching machine

A pitching machine is a machine that automatically pitches a baseball to a batter at different speeds and styles. Most machines are hand-fed, but there are some that automatically feed. There are multiple types of pitching machines; softball, baseball, youth, adult, and a combination of both softball and baseball.

== History ==
In 1897, mathematics instructor Charles Hinton designed a gunpowder-powered baseball pitching machine for the Princeton University baseball team's batting practice. According to one source it caused several injuries, and may have been in part responsible for Hinton's dismissal from Princeton that year. However, the machine was versatile: it was capable of throwing variable speeds with an adjustable breech size and firing curve balls by the use of two rubber-coated steel fingers at the muzzle of the pitcher. Hinton successfully introduced the machine to the University of Minnesota where he worked as an assistant professor until 1900.

The arm-type pitching machine was designed by Paul Giovagnoli in 1952, for use on his driving range. Using a metal arm mounted to a large gear, this type of machine simulates the motion of an actual pitcher, throwing balls with consistent speed and direction. One- and two-wheel style machines were originally patented by Bartley N. Marty in 1916.

== Design ==
Pitching machines come in a variety of styles. However, the most popular machines are an arm action machine, circular wheel machine and a battery-powered compressed-air machines. The arm action machine simulates the delivery of a pitcher and carries a ball at the end of a bracket, much like a hand would. The arm action machine then delivers the ball in an overhand motion. The circular wheel machine contains one, two or three wheels that spin much like a bike tire. The wheels on these machines are usually set in either a horizontal or vertical fashion. With a circular machine, a ball shoots out towards the hitter after it is fed into the wheel or wheels. Three-wheel machines are more easily adjusted to be able to throw a variety of pitches and they can be used for a wide range of other practice scenarios, such as ground work or flyballs. Battery-powered compressed-air pitching machines, such as Zooka compress air in a barrel and release that compression to project a ball. These machines have additional safety features that wheeled and arm action machine's do not and are more portable.

The use of pitching machines allows baseball and softball players the opportunity to get batting practice on their own. Most batting machines are set up in a batting cage, a netted area that will contain the balls after they are hit. By using a pitching machine and a batting cage, hitters can get as much batting practice as they desire without necessitating the cooperation of a human pitcher (and without wearing out the arm of one willing to cooperate). The cost of pitching machines varies greatly.

== Use in Little League ==
In the youngest divisions of Little League, and other youth baseball organizations, pitching machines are used instead of live pitching. This is done to give the kids more experience hitting the ball, as pitchers at that age would tend to throw few strikes. Simple spring-loaded manual models are common (such as from Louisville Slugger) as are battery-powered compressed-air machines (such as from Zooka).

== See also ==
- Bowling machine
