= Striking out the side =

Baseball term

In baseball, striking out the side refers to when a pitcher strikes out all the batters he faces in the defensive half-inning in which he pitches. There is no official statistic in regard to this accomplishment, though it is often noted by commentators and fans when it occurs.

There is a disagreement as to the exact definition of striking out the side. Some feel a pitcher should be credited with striking out the side when all three outs in the inning were obtained via the strikeout, regardless of what other hitters that the pitcher has faced have done. Others believe a pitcher only has struck out the side when he has retired the batters in succession without allowing anyone to reach base. The latter definition is unlikely, however, given the common phrase, “(the pitcher) struck out the side in order.”

In theory, a pitcher can record any number of strikeouts in an inning, since it is possible for a batter to safely reach first base without recording an out if the catcher does not hold the third strike. Recording more than three strikeouts in an inning, however, is a rare occurrence.

== See also ==
- Immaculate inning, the rare feat of retiring all three batters faced in an inning on strikeouts with only nine pitches thrown
