= Batting cage =

Enclosure for baseball batting practice

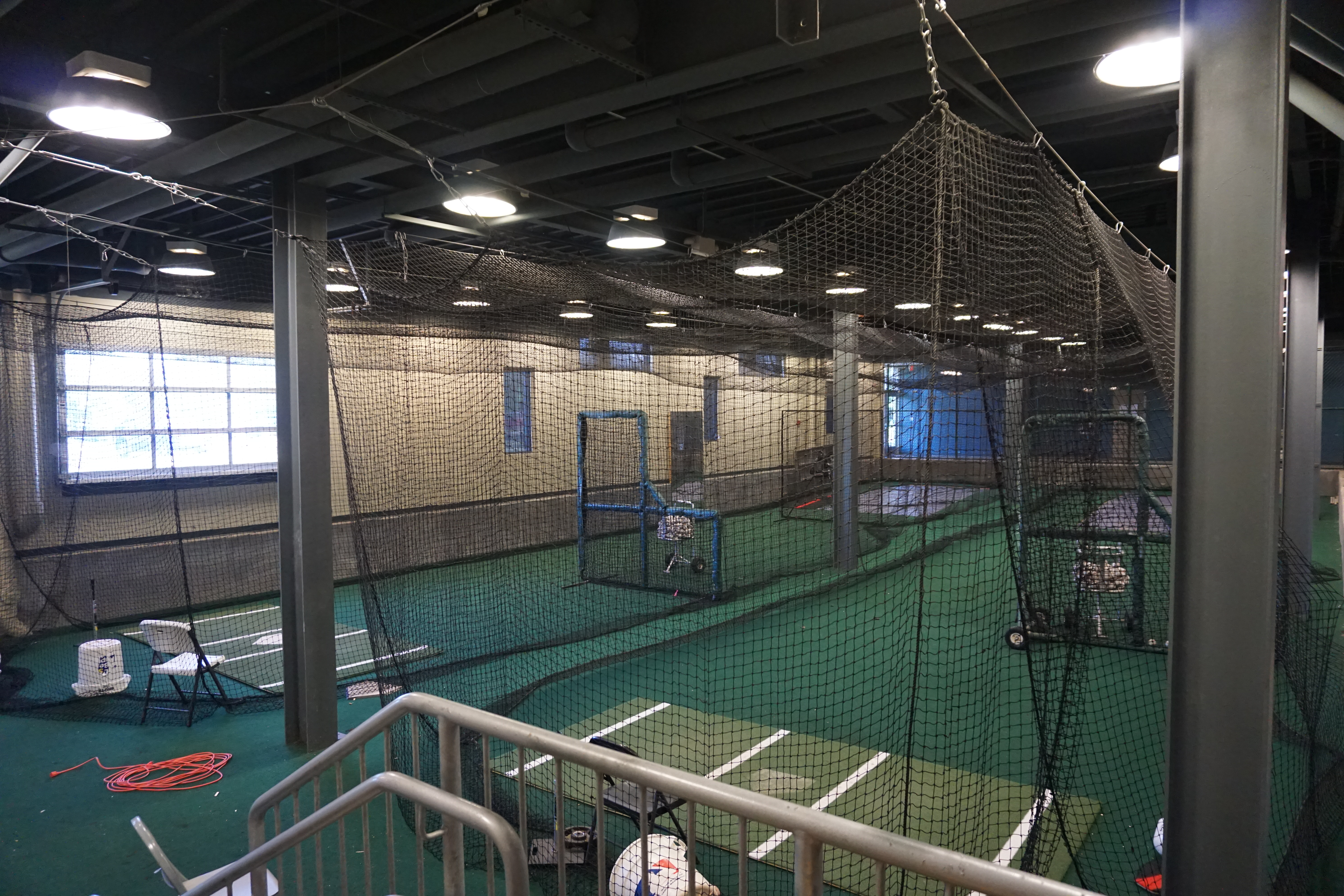
The batting cages at Arvest Ballpark in Springdale, Arkansas in May 2017

A batting cage (or tunnel) is an enclosed area for baseball or softball players to practice the skill of batting.

The optimal material for batting cages is netting, and they are typically rectangular in shape. A chain-link fence is not required but can be useful to enclose the netting to prevent vandalism. However, this material is not suitable for the primary impact layer because it will warp the fencing and damage balls. The ideal netting for a batting cage is either diamond- or square-shaped. Both types of netting have their advantages and disadvantages.

== Usage ==
A batter stands at one end of the cage, with a pitching machine (or, less often, a human pitcher) at the opposing end. The pitcher or pitching machine pitches baseballs to the batter, who hits them. It is recommended to use a protective pitcher's L-screen to prevent batted balls from striking the pitcher or machine.

The cage is used to keep the loose baseballs within a certain range so that they're easy to pick up and are not lost. Batting cages are found both indoors and outdoors.

The interior floor of a batting cage may be sloped, to automatically feed the baseballs back into the automatic pitching machine. The automatic pitching machines using sloped floors usually pitch out a synthetic baseball or softball, rather than an official solid core leather hardball.

Commercial batting cages pitch with several different speeds, which can range from 30 miles (48 km) (for softball) to 90 miles (140 km) per hour.

Cricket nets and tunnels, used by cricket batsmen are similar in purpose, but bowling machines are much less common than facing a live bowler; baseball pitchers tend to practice in separate tunnels.

Netting can greatly vary in quality and durability. #21 Gauge is suitable for little-league players, #36 Gauge is suitable for High-School players, and #60 is recommended for Commercial facilities and Pro Players. Resources such as this Netting Infographic Guide are helpful for identifying the best netting for an application.

There are many different benefits of using batting cages, including improved hand-eye coordination, consistency, and improved confidence.

== Types ==
=== Indoor ===
Indoor batting cages are typically suspended by steel cable lines, 1 line every 6–8 feet. Anchor points being of utmost importance, they are typically connected to the wall using a steel plate. Without strong anchors, the netting will sag.

=== Outdoor ===
Outdoor batting cages are typically installed using steel pole sections (2 uprights and 1 cross-bar per section), spaced every 12–20 feet. The greater the span between supports, the more sag in the netting and less usable the cage becomes.
