= List of Desert Island Discs episodes (1991–2000) =

The BBC Radio 4 programme Desert Island Discs invites castaways to choose eight pieces of music, a book (in addition to the Bible – or a religious text appropriate to that person's beliefs – and the Complete Works of Shakespeare) and a luxury item that they would take to an imaginary desert island, where they will be marooned indefinitely. The rules state that the chosen luxury item must not be anything animate or indeed anything that enables the castaway to escape from the island, for instance a radio set, sailing yacht or aeroplane. The choices of book and luxury can sometimes give insight into the guest's life, and the choices of guests between 1991 and 2000 are listed here.

== 1991 ==
Date	Castaway	Book	Luxury	More info
6 January 1991	Lord Goodman	Who's Who	An enormous box of chocolate gingers	more
13 January 1991	Adelaide Hall	A book about American history	Box of seeds	more
20 January 1991	Fred Zinnemann	War and Peace by Leo Tolstoy	Very large self-renewing bottle of scotch	more
27 January 1991	Brian Eno	Contingency, Irony, and Solidarity by Richard Rorty	Radio telescope	more
3 February 1991	Professor Ralf Dahrendorf	A book of Greek poetry	Dice to test the luck of a ship rescuing him	more
10 February 1991	Paddy Ashdown MP	The collected works of John Donne	Laptop computer	more
17 February 1991	Dame Ninette de Valois	A collection of poems	An everlasting bottle of sleeping pills	more
24 February 1991	Ronald Eyre	A talking book by Judi Dench	Supply of flower bulbs	more
3 March 1991	Sir Denis Forman	Raj Quartet by Paul Scott	Satellite dish and TV	more
10 March 1991	Jeffrey Bernard	The Complete Sherlock Holmes by Sir Arthur Conan Doyle	High powered hunting rifle and ammunition	more
17 March 1991	Sir Trevor Holdsworth	Collected Plays of J. B. Priestley	Upright piano	more
24 March 1991	Marti Caine	Do-it-yourself manual	Do-it-yourself kit	more
7 April 1991	Naomi Mitchison	Book of modern poetry	Endless supply of writing materials	more
14 April 1991	Lord King	Brewer's Dictionary of Phrase and Fable	Supply of cigars and matches	more
21 April 1991	Dr Jonathan Sacks	The Talmud	Large supply of pencils	more
28 April 1991	Dame Shirley Porter	SAS Survival Manual	Large Swiss Army Knife	more
12 May 1991	Cecil Lewis	Sagittarius Surviving by C. S. Lewis	Fax machine	more
19 May 1991	John Simpson	Anything in French by Marcel Proust	Flute	more
26 May 1991	John Smith	Anthology of poems	Case of champagne	more
2 June 1991	Marco Pierre White	Ma Gastronomie by Fernand Point	Picture of his daughter	more
9 June 1991	Derek Walcott	Ulysses by James Joyce	Carton of cigarettes	more
16 June 1991	A. S. Byatt	A la recherche du temps perdu by Marcel Proust	Large filing cabinet full of A4 paper and pens	more
23 June 1991	John Hegarty	The Crock of Gold by James Stephens	Clarinet	more
30 June 1991	Ron Todd	The collected works of Robert Burns	Piano	more
7 July 1991	Lord Shawcross	The Way We Live Now by Anthony Trollope	CD player/solar-powered radio	more
25 August 1991	Alan Bleasdale	Catch-22 by Joseph Heller	Nail clippers	more
1 September 1991	Maxwell Hutchinson	Four Quartets by T. S. Eliot	Guitar	more
8 September 1991	Bernice Rubens	Poems For Joy and Sermons For Solace by John Donne	A painting by her daughter	more
15 September 1991	John Banham	The collected works of A. E. Housman	Cigars and matches	more
22 September 1991	Klaus Tennstedt	Dr Faustus by Thomas Mann	Mountain bike	more
29 September 1991	David Bailey	Voices of Silence by Malraux	Nelson's Column	more
6 October 1991	Imran Khan	Bang-E-Dara by Iqbal	Shotgun and clay pigeon trap	more
13 October 1991	John Schlesinger	Dictionary of Quotations	Magimix (battery powered)	more
20 October 1991	Elizabeth Esteve-Coll	Four Quartets by T. S. Eliot	Expensive perfumed hand cream	more
27 October 1991	Alan Alda	Robinson Crusoe by Daniel Defoe	Italian pasta	more
3 November 1991	E. P. Thompson	Songs of Innocence and Experience by William Blake	Typewriter and paper	more
10 November 1991	Lord Delfont	1515–1985 British Music Theatre Book	Cigars and matches	more
17 November 1991	James Lovelock	The Golden Treasury by Francis Palgrave	Pen and paper	more
24 November 1991	Dilys Powell	Oliver Twist by Charles Dickens	Mouth organ with instructions	more
1 December 1991	Fred Dibnah	Bound volumes of the Engineer magazine	Steamroller	more
8 December 1991	Sue Townsend	Lucky Jim by Kingsley Amis	Swimming pool of champagne	more
22 December 1991	Gorden Kaye	This Is Your Life by Gorden Kaye	A clock given to him for turning on the Oxford lights	more

== 1992 ==
Date	Castaway	Book	Luxury	More info
12 January 1992	Steven Berkoff	A gardening book	Piano	more
19 January 1992	Reverend David Jenkins	The Complete Sherlock Holmes by Sir Arthur Conan Doyle	Binoculars	more
26 January 1992	John Major	The Small House at Allington by Anthony Trollope	The Oval cricket ground replica and bowling machine	more
2 February 1992	J. G. Ballard	Moby Dick by Herman Melville	Unicycle	more
9 February 1992	Robbie Coltrane	The Lady in the Lake by Raymond Chandler	Pencils and paper	more
16 February 1992	Sir Roger Bannister	Anthology of Russian, American and English stories	Solar-powered receiver to receive BBC Radio 4	more
23 February 1992	Elvis Costello	Selected Works of James Thurber	Upright piano	more
1 March 1992	Dr Steve Jones	Valley of Bones by Anthony Powell	Stuffed body of the Minister of Education	more
8 March 1992	Jocelyn Stevens	Other Men's Flowers by Lord Wavell	One mile stretch of the River Test in Hampshire	more
15 March 1992	Sir Isaiah Berlin	Works, prose and verse by Aleksandr Pushkin	Large armchair stacked with cushions	more
22 March 1992	Lady Soames	Memories from Beyond the Grave by Chateaubriand	Supply of fine Havana cigars	more
5 April 1992	Sir Ernst Gombrich	Goethe's Poems by Johann Wolfgang Goethe	Bathtub with an endless supply of hot water	more
26 April 1992	Anthony Rolfe Johnson	Welsh/English Dictionary	Parquet floor and tap shoes	more
3 May 1992	Henrietta, Marchioness of Tavistock	History of the English-Speaking Peoples by Winston Churchill	Triangular pillow	more
10 May 1992	Will Carling	The Hobbit by J. R. R. Tolkien	Flotation tank	more
17 May 1992	Michael Grade	The Wind in the Willows by Kenneth Grahame	Sports results	more
24 May 1992	Baron Taylor of Gosforth	War and Peace by Leo Tolstoy	Piano	more
31 May 1992	Prunella Scales	The Complete Works of Shakespeare in German and the Bible in Russian, and a Russian dictionary	Huge tapestry kit	more
7 June 1992	Duncan Goodhew	The Lord of the Rings by J. R. R. Tolkien	Wig	more
14 June 1992	Robert Lindsay	Sons and Lovers by D. H. Lawrence	Computer chess set	more
21 June 1992	Terry Waite	Complete Cambridge Histories	Chess computer	more
28 June 1992	Vivienne Westwood	À la recherche du temps perdu by Marcel Proust	Multi-lingual dictionary	more
5 July 1992	Clare Short MP	Geometry tutor	Piano	more
12 July 1992	Mohamed Amin	Life of John F. Kennedy	Satellite dish and television set	more
19 July 1992	Sir Peregrine Worsthorne	Vile Bodies by Evelyn Waugh	Hallucinogenic drugs	more
26 July 1992	David Mellor	The Mayor of Casterbridge by Thomas Hardy	Telephone (disconnected)	more
6 September 1992	Bob Geldof	The Diary of Samuel Pepys	Metropolitan Museum in New York	more
13 September 1992	Penelope Leach	The Complete Works of Sigmund Freud	Coffee	more
20 September 1992	Raymond Blanc	The Little Prince by Antoine de Saint-Exupéry	A good luck stone (from his wife)	more
27 September 1992	Chad Varah	The New Oxford Book of English Verse	Own bathroom run by solar power with hot and cold water and a video player attached	more
4 October 1992	Juliet Stevenson	The Complete Works of W. B. Yeats	Masaccio Frescos in the Brancacci Chapel	more
11 October 1992	Lord Sainsbury	The New Oxford Book of English Verse	Bed	more
18 October 1992	Julie Andrews	The Once and Future King by T. H. White	Piano	more
25 October 1992	Gavin Laird	The Diary of Samuel Pepys	Year's recording of the Today programme	more
1 November 1992	General H Norman Schwarzkopf	The Prophet by Kahlil Gibran	His dog, Bear	more
8 November 1992	Christabel Bielenberg	War and Peace by Leo Tolstoy	A comfortable chair	more
22 November 1992	John Eliot Gardiner	Memoirs by Hector Berlioz	Sancerre	more
29 November 1992	Lord Tebbit	History of the English-Speaking Peoples by Winston Churchill	Drinking fountain with taps for sancerre and claret	more
6 December 1992	Carmen Callil	Maurice Guest by Henry Handel Richardson	A film - The Commitments	more
13 December 1992	Professor Ghillean Prance	The Natural History of Selborne by Gilbert White	Accordion	more
20 December 1992	Paul Smith	The Beano Annual 1974	Notebook and pencil	more
25 December 1992	Stephen Hawking	Middlemarch by George Eliot	Creme brulee	more

== 1993 ==
Date	Castaway	Book	Luxury	More info
3 January 1993	Elizabeth Jennings	The New Oxford Book of American Verse	Pad, felt pens and biros	more
10 January 1993	Barbara Mills QC	History of the Crusades by Steven Runciman	Tennis court, balls, racket and wall	more
17 January 1993	Dervla Murphy	The Diary of Samuel Pepys	A still to distill berries, etc., into drink	more
24 January 1993	Evelyn Glennie	Way of the Peaceful Warrior by Dan Millman	Chocolate	more
31 January 1993	Anthony Storr	A la recherche du temps perdu by Marcel Proust	Piano	more
21 February 1993	Sir Robin Butler	Rise and Fall of the Great Powers by Paul Kennedy	A bag of golf clubs and balls	more
28 February 1993	Elijah Moshinsky	Michael Frayn translation of the Complete Plays of Anton Chekhov	A duvet	more
7 March 1993	Ken Livingstone MP	The Myths of Avalon by Marion Zimmer Bradley	The World Service	more
14 March 1993	David Croft	Collected Poems of Sir John Betjeman	Piano	more
4 April 1993	Richard Gregory	An astronomy book by Patrick Moore	Astronomical telescope	more
11 April 1993	Lord Oaksey	Mr Mulliner's Memoirs by P. G. Wodehouse	Cargo of champagne	more
18 April 1993	Anton Edelmann	Tibetan Book of Living and Dying by Rainer Maria Rilke	Wok	more
25 April 1993	Baroness Blackstone	Middlemarch by George Eliot	Tennis balls and racket	more
2 May 1993	John Boorman	Memories, Dreams and Reflections by Carl Jung	Telescope	more
9 May 1993	John Cole	À la recherche du temps perdu by Marcel Proust	Typewriter	more
16 May 1993	Eva Burrows	Faber Book of Religious Verse	Game of Scrabble with paper and pencil	more
23 May 1993	Lord Weinstock	If This Is a Man by Primo Levi	Photograph album of family, friends and colleagues	more
30 May 1993	Kaye Webb	Poetry of Naomi Lewis	Very big photograph album on a wheeling table	more
6 June 1993	Frank Bruno	Robinson Crusoe by Daniel Defoe	Picture of his family	more
13 June 1993	Betty Boothroyd MP	A Suitable Boy by Vikram Seth	Mace of the House of Commons	more
20 June 1993	Joan Baez	The Diary of Anne Frank	Personal pouch with a silver lion on it	more
27 June 1993	Sir Leon Brittan	The collected works of Chaucer	Collection of large-scale Ordnance Survey maps of England	more
4 July 1993	Peter Mayle	The Leopard by Giuseppe di Lampedusa	The menu from his favourite Parisien restaurant	more
11 July 1993	Nicholas Hytner	The collected works of Samuel Taylor Coleridge	Large supply of total block suncream	more
12 September 1993	Isabel Allende	All correspondence between her and her mother	Paper and pencils	more
19 September 1993	Paul Merton	Biography of Buster Keaton by Rudi Blesh	Bed	more
26 September 1993	Lord Palumbo	On the Road by Jack Kerouac	Telescope	more
3 October 1993	Virginia Bottomley MP	Norton's Star Atlas	BBC Radio 4's Today programme	more
10 October 1993	Lesley Garrett	Photograph album	Tightrope	more
17 October 1993	Raymond Seitz	Oxford Anthology of Modern Poetry	Big box full of family albums	more
24 October 1993	Kenny Everett	Eagle annual	Bathroom suite	more
31 October 1993	Judge Stephen Tumim	Tristram Shandy by Laurence Sterne	Marbel bust of Laurence Sterne	more
7 November 1993	Sybil Marshall	Huckleberry Finn by Mark Twain	Inexhaustible supply of Swiss lawn handkerchiefs	more
14 November 1993	Shirley Anne Field	Reader's Digest	Large Chippendale mirror	more
21 November 1993	Doris Lessing	A Thousand and One Nights	Magic carpet	more
28 November 1993	Taki	Essential Hemingway by Ernest Hemingway	Boxing punchbag	more
19 December 1993	Phil Collins	Prehistory of the Far Side by Gary Larson	Piano	more
26 December 1993	Lord Ashley of Stoke	A book about warfare	Smoked salmon and wine	more

== 1994 ==
Date	Castaway	Book	Luxury	More info
2 January 1994	Oliver Sacks	Dictionary of Musical Themes	Scuba diving kit	more
9 January 1994	Ian Hislop	Civilisation by Kenneth Clark	Frosties	more
16 January 1994	Sir Harrison Birtwistle	A Latin Primer	Chainsaw	more
23 January 1994	Willy Russell	A Latin Primer	English meadow with an oak tree	more
30 January 1994	Dame Cicely Saunders	Oxford Dictionary of Quotations	Pen and paper	more
6 February 1994	Douglas Adams	Omnibus of Golfing Stories by P. G. Wodehouse	Martin D28 left-handed guitar	more
13 February 1994	Rosemary Verey	A Celebration of Gardens by Sir Roy Strong	Waterproof pens, paper and folders	more
20 February 1994	Kenneth Clarke MP	The Life of Lord Melbourne by Lord David Cecil	Tenor sax	more
27 February 1994	Frances Partridge	Memoirs by Duc de Saint-Simon	Flower press	more
6 March 1994	Christina Dodwell	The Prophet by Kahlil Gibran	Pen and paper	more
27 March 1994	Conrad Black	Oxford Book of English Verse	Model of HMS Hood	more
3 April 1994	Sir Ranulph Fiennes	Gormenghast by Mervyn Peake	Antisan for insect bites	more
10 April 1994	Roger McGough	The Times atlas of the night sky	Black cab	more
17 April 1994	Alan Hacker	Middlemarch by George Eliot	Hovercraft wheelchair with cappuccino machine	more
24 April 1994	Trevor McDonald	Anthology of poetry	Box of paints, brushes and paper	more
1 May 1994	Garrison Keillor	Roget's Thesaurus	Set of china (four place settings)	more
8 May 1994	Sir John Wilson	A chess strategy book (in Braille)	A sonic probe	more
15 May 1994	Kate Adie	The Canterbury Tales by Geoffrey Chaucer	Large Victorian bath with claw feet	more
22 May 1994	Britt Ekland	Recent editions of magazines, e.g. Vanity Fair, Vogue	Case of Evian water and champagne	more
29 May 1994	Peter Scudamore	Book of verse by Rudyard Kipling	Snorkeling equipment	more
5 June 1994	Milton Shulman	The Cookery Book by Constance Spry	Tennis racket and ball machine	more
12 June 1994	Zoë Wanamaker	Greek Myths by Robert Graves	Samson tobacco and liquorice Rizla papers	more
19 June 1994	Brian Sewell	Songs from the 1880s with piano accompaniment by Schubert	Sculpture by Michelangelo	more
26 June 1994	John Drummond	Encyclopaedia of all the well-known operas	Small theatre	more
3 July 1994	Derek Jameson	The Grapes of Wrath by John Steinbeck	Word processor	more
10 July 1994	Rabbi Hugo Gryn	Biography of Churchill by Martin Gilbert	A parking space	more
11 September 1994	Joanna Trollope	Oxford Book of English Verse	Bed and white Egyptian sheets	more
18 September 1994	John Tavener	Apophthegmata Patrum (early writing of Egyptian fathers)	Upright piano	more
25 September 1994	Mary Stott	The Act of Creation by Arthur Koestler	Watercolours for painting	more
2 October 1994	Professor James Fenton	The Divine Comedy by Dante Alighieri	Snorkel, mask and harpoon	more
9 October 1994	Jeanette Winterson	Four Quartets by T. S. Eliot	A case of Krug champagne	more
16 October 1994	Sir George Christie	Origin of Species by Charles Darwin	BBC Radio 4's The Archers - all the recordings from the beginning	more
23 October 1994	Lynda La Plante	Fairy Stories by Honoré de Balzac	Mouth organ	more
30 October 1994	Kathleen Hale	A la recherche du temps perdu by Marcel Proust	A gilabra (cloak of gold)	more
6 November 1994	Archbishop Desmond Tutu	Parting the Waters by Taylor Branch	Ice-cream maker (especially for rum and raisin flavour)	more
13 November 1994	Berthold Goldschmidt	Joseph and His Brothers by Thomas Mann	Vanity case including metal mirror and shaving kit	more
20 November 1994	Glenys Kinnock	Atlas of the Third World	Toilet bag full of skin-barrier creams	more
27 November 1994	Sir Howard Hodgkin	Journal De Eugène Delacroix by Eugène Delacroix	Mayonnaise – permanent supply	more
4 December 1994	Margaret Forster	A House For Mr Biswas by V. S. Naipaul	Unlimited supply of A4 white paper and cartridges for fountain pen	more
18 December 1994	Penelope Hobhouse	The Golden Bowl by Henry James	Laptop computer	more
25 December 1994	David Jason	The complete boatbuilder's book	A complete carpenter's toolbox	more

== 1995 ==
Date	Castaway	Book	Luxury	More info
1 January 1995	Alan Clark	A History of Western Philosophy by Bertrand Russell	Piano	more
8 January 1995	Patricia Hodge	A compendium of the plays of Harold Pinter	Supply of embroidery	more
15 January 1995	Phil Redmond	The collected works of Charles Dickens	Magnifying glass	more
22 January 1995	Dr. Richard Dawkins	The Jeeves Omnibus by P. G. Wodehouse	Computer (solar-powered)	more
29 January 1995	Sir Adrian Cadbury	Dr. Johnson's Lexicographic Works by Samuel Johnson	Fibreglass sculling boat	more
19 February 1995	Jimmy Knapp	The Socialist Sixth of the World by Hewlett Johnson	Case of Talisker whisky	more
26 February 1995	Christopher Lee	The Sword in the Stone by T. H. White	Set of golf clubs	more
5 March 1995	Professor Eric Hobsbawm	Canto General by Pablo Neruda	Binoculars	more
12 March 1995	Nigel Nicolson	A Guide to the Universe	Telescope	more
19 March 1995	Felix Aprahamian	Du Cote De Chez Swann by Marcel Proust	Swiss army knife	more
2 April 1995	Nina Bawden	The Decline and Fall of the Roman Empire by Edward Gibbon	Plain paper, plastic folders and ballpoint pens	more
9 April 1995	James Bowman	Rebecca by Daphne Du Maurier	Fabergé egg	more
16 April 1995	Hugh Grant	King Ottokar's Sceptre by Herge	Supply of handkerchiefs	more
23 April 1995	George Lloyd	Piers Plowman (in Middle English) by William Langland	Romney's portrait of Lady Hamilton	more
30 April 1995	Pete Waterman	A history of Great Western Railway engines	Havana cigars and matches	more
7 May 1995	Dr. George Carey	Four Quartets by T. S. Eliot	Computer and an empty bottle	more
14 May 1995	Neil Simon	How To Swim	Large harmonica	more
21 May 1995	Sir Bernard Ingham	The Times Atlas of the World	Colin Cowdrey's bowling machine	more
28 May 1995	Marianne Faithfull	Robinson Crusoe by Daniel Defoe	Pen from Asprey's with attached magnifying glass	more
4 June 1995	Brian Blessed	In Search of the Miraculous by Peter Ouspensky	Scarf given to him by the Dalai Lama	more
11 June 1995	John Lee Hooker	A book with pictures of pretty women	His guitar	more
18 June 1995	Sir Magdi Yacoub	Pluto's Republic by Sir Peter Medawar	Hammock	more
25 June 1995	Jasper Conran	Tales by Hoffman	Vintage Krug champagne	more
2 July 1995	Duke of Westminster	Through Russian Snows by G. A. Henty	Telescope	more
9 July 1995	Wendy Richard	Wilt by Tom Sharpe	Tapestry to make	more
10 September 1995	John Updike	The collected works of Marcel Proust	Silken tent (for luxury, not survival)	more
17 September 1995	Max Nicholson	The Phenomenon of Man by Pierre Teilhard De Chardin	Binoculars	more
24 September 1995	Maurice Saatchi	Hamlet (1875 edition) by William Shakespeare	Virtual-reality headset	more
1 October 1995	Jenny Pitman	Veterinary Notes For Horse Owners	Television set	more
8 October 1995	Alan Yentob	Essays by Michel de Montaigne	Video recorder	more
15 October 1995	Richard Hoggart	Essays by Michel de Montaigne	Fountain pen and paper	more
22 October 1995	Don Black	14,000 Things to be Happy About by Barbara Ann Kipfer	Snooker table	more
29 October 1995	Elizabeth Jane Howard	All the sonatas by Scarlatti	Piano	more
5 November 1995	Gillian Shephard MP	The Warning of the Middle Ages by Johan H. Huizinga	Madame Rochas scent	more
12 November 1995	Umberto Eco	The New York Phone Book	Laptop computer	more
19 November 1995	George Martin	A book on how to build a boat	Electric keyboard	more
3 December 1995	Alison Steadman	One Hundred Years of Solitude by Gabriel García Márquez	Hot lemon flannels (as provided in Chinese restaurants)	more
17 December 1995	Barbara Dickson	English & Scottish Ballads by Francis Child	Very large set of solar-powered hair rollers	more
24 December 1995	Petula Clark	Anything by Peter Ustinov	Her piano	more
31 December 1995	Lady Margaret Tebbit	Hillier's Dictionary of Plants	An endless team of Man Fridays	more

== 1996 ==
Date	Castaway	Book	Luxury	More info
7 January 1996	Christopher Hampton	Anything by Marcel Proust	Pen and paper	more
14 January 1996	Jimmy McGovern	Ulysses by James Joyce	Haemorrhoid ointment	more
21 January 1996	Chili Bouchier	In Tune With The Infinite: Fullness of Peace Power by Ralph Waldo Trine	Make-up kit	more
28 January 1996	Julian Barnes	Letters of Gustave Flaubert	Writing equipment	more
4 February 1996	Eve Arnold	Arabian Nights	Dark room, film and camera	more
11 February 1996	Susan Hill	The Pursuit of Love by Nancy Mitford	The Barnes Collection (paintings)	more
18 February 1996	Professor George Steiner	500 year ahead calendar and appointment book	Computer	more
25 February 1996	Sir Roy Calne	Global Biodiversity by Brian Goombridge	Paints and canvas	more
3 March 1996	Gordon Brown	The Story of Art by Sir Ernst Gombrich	Tennis ball machine and racket	more
17 March 1996	Lord Alexander	Other Men's Flowers by Lord Wavell	Paints and canvas	more
24 March 1996	Kyra Vayne	A culinary book	Peanuts and treats to tame animals and birds	more
31 March 1996	Simon Weston	Sharpe's Eagle by Bernard Cornwell	Daily newspapers	more
7 April 1996	Dickie Bird	Wisden Cricketers' Almanack	TV and satellite to watch Test matches	more
14 April 1996	Viscount Rothermere	The Divine Comedy by Dante Alighieri	A pair of scissors	more
21 April 1996	Hanif Kureishi	The Complete Works of Sigmund Freud	Marijuana seeds	more
28 April 1996	Mitsuko Uchida	Anything by Leo Tolstoy (in Russian and English)	Piano	more
5 May 1996	Pauline Quirke	Crying With Laughter by Bob Monkhouse	Shampoo	more
12 May 1996	Hugh Laurie	A self-learn Italian book (slowly)	Family photo album	more
19 May 1996	Janet Holmes à Court	Tourmaline by Randolph Stow	Jar of vegemite	more
26 May 1996	Michael White	Anything by Marcel Proust	Bicycle	more
2 June 1996	Gerry Robinson	The History of the World by John Roberts	Painting kit (easel, oils, brushes)	more
9 June 1996	Peggy Mount	The Diary of Noël Coward	Tea in abundance	more
16 June 1996	Quentin Crewe	Essays by Michel de Montaigne	The cellar from Trinity College, Cambridge	more
18 August 1996	André Previn	The collected works of Anton Chekhov	Piano	more
25 August 1996	Anita Lasker-Wallfisch	The History of the World by John Roberts	Cello	more
1 September 1996	Sir Terence Conran	History of the World by H. G. Wells	Endless supply of A4 paper and 4B pencils	more
8 September 1996	Professor Colin Blakemore	The Discoverers by Daniel Boorstin	Solar-powered Internet (to receive, not send)	more
15 September 1996	Kevin Whately	The Moor's Last Sigh by Salman Rushdie	Northumbrian pipes	more
22 September 1996	Fran Landesman	Rebel Without Applause and Jaywalking by Jay Landesman	Cannabis seeds	more
29 September 1996	Ben Elton	His wedding photo album	The British Museum	more
6 October 1996	Lewis Wolpert	Enquiry Concerning Human Understanding and The Principles of Morals by David Hume	Bicycle	more
13 October 1996	Rumer Godden	The Atlantic Book of British and American Poetry by Edith Sitwell	A widow's cruise filled with whisky	more
20 October 1996	Jack Charlton	Encyclopaedia of How to Survive	Fishing rod	more
27 October 1996	Jancis Robinson	Middlemarch by George Eliot	Cellar of wines and a corkscrew	more
3 November 1996	Chris Patten	A Brief History of Time by Stephen Hawking	Bath	more
10 November 1996	Sir Laurens Van Der Post	The Golden Bough by James Frazer	Piano	more
17 November 1996	Tessa Sanderson	The History of the World by John Roberts	Toothbrush and toothpaste	more
24 November 1996	Tony Blair	Ivanhoe by Walter Scott	Guitar	more
1 December 1996	Bruce Forsyth	The collected works of Omar Khayyam	Sand iron (golf club)	more
8 December 1996	Robert Winston	The Koran (in Arabic and English)	Glass and tools to make a telescope	more
15 December 1996	Ian Dury	Macmillan Dictionary of Art	Mixing desk (solar-powered)	more
22 December 1996	Jennifer Saunders	Traveller's Prelude by Freya Stark	Tribute Heads by Elisabeth Frink	more
29 December 1996	Martin Amis	The Complete Works of John Milton	Cable television	more

== 1997 ==
Date	Castaway	Book	Luxury	More info
5 January 1997	John Cleese	Stand By Your Man by Tammy Wynette	Michael Palin – stuffed	more
26 January 1997	Irene Thomas	Complete score of Fidelio by Beethoven	Teddy bear stuffed with tea and lily of the valley	more
2 February 1997	Gene Wilder	The Notebooks of Captain Georges by Jean Renoir	Earl Grey tea	more
9 February 1997	Terry Pratchett	Edible Plants of the South Seas by Emile Massal	The Chrysler Building	more
16 February 1997	Mary Benson	Unpublished Notes by Athol Fugard	Telescope	more
23 February 1997	Nico Ladenis	Beau Geste by P. C. Wren	Cantona's Manchester United shirt	more
2 March 1997	Dr. Susan Greenfield	The Leopard by Giuseppe di Lampedusa	Endless supply of curry	more
9 March 1997	Redmond O'Hanlon	War and Peace by Leo Tolstoy	Pair of green, insulated Leica binoculars 8 X 20	more
16 March 1997	Nina Campbell	Photograph album	Bed	more
23 March 1997	Peter Blake	Lemprieres' Dictionary by Lawrence Norfolk	Gym	more
30 March 1997	Virginia Ironside	The Power of Positive Thinking by Norman Vincent Peale	Big bag of plaster to make heads of friends	more
20 April 1997	Saeed Jaffrey	The Complete Works of Mirza Ghalib	Case of Black Label and Dom Pérignon	more
27 April 1997	Andy Hamilton	The Physics of Immortality by Frank J. Tipler	Football	more
4 May 1997	Sir Martin Rees	Collective cartoons of Gary Larson	Jefferson reclining chair	more
11 May 1997	David Wynne	The Iliad and The Odyssey by Homer	Harmonica	more
18 May 1997	Harry Enfield	Bleak House by Charles Dickens	Beer and a cigarette machine	more
25 May 1997	Sian Phillips	The Medical Care of Merchant Seamen by William Louis Wheeler	Pencils and paper	more
1 June 1997	Joanna MacGregor	The Sleep Walkers by Arthur Koestler	Sampler to record the noises of the island	more
8 June 1997	Benjamin Zephaniah	Poetical Works of Shelley	Law of the island (so he could break it)	more
15 June 1997	Christina Noble	The Book of Kells	Photo of an Irish cottage	more
22 June 1997	Eric Sykes	Ripley's Believe It or Not	Sand wedge and crate of golf balls	more
24 August 1997	Iain Banks	The Complete Monty Python	Front seat of a Porsche	more
31 August 1997	Cleo Laine	The Jazz Revolution by John Dankworth	Perfume	more
7 September 1997	Sir Frank Kermode	The Decline and Fall of the Roman Empire by Edward Gibbon	Samuel Palmer's painting Moonlit Landscape	more
14 September 1997	Ursula Owen	The collected works of Anton Chekhov	Family photo album	more
21 September 1997	Mike Leigh	One Hundred Years of Solitude by Gabriel García Márquez	Lavatory and lavatory paper	more
28 September 1997	Peter O'Sullevan	Ends and Means by Aldous Huxley	Bottle of Calvados	more
5 October 1997	Jools Holland	The Four Books of Architecture by Andrea Palladio	Piano	more
12 October 1997	Rose Tremain	A Brief History of Time by Stephen Hawking	Word processor	more
19 October 1997	Richard Rodney Bennett	The Atlantic Book of British and American Poetry by Edith Sitwell	6mm 36 inch circular knitting needle with a point at each end	more
26 October 1997	Richard Mabey	The Wind in the Willows by Kenneth Grahame	Guitar	more
2 November 1997	John Julius Norwich	The Decline and Fall of the Roman Empire by Edward Gibbon	Laptop computer	more
9 November 1997	Anthony Minghella	Collected piano works by Bach	Piano	more
23 November 1997	Thelma Holt	Utopia by Thomas Moore	Rosary beads	more
30 November 1997	Loyd Grossman	Treasure Island by Robert Louis Stevenson	Fishing rod	more
7 December 1997	Paula Rego	Tender is the Night by F. Scott Fitzgerald	Pencil and paper	more
14 December 1997	Chris Haskins	The collected works of Seán O'Casey	Pen and paper	more
21 December 1997	Sir Harry Secombe	The Pickwick Papers by Charles Dickens	Guitar	more
28 December 1997	Glenda Jackson MP	The History and Creation of a Japanese Sand Garden	Bath	more

== 1998 ==
Date	Castaway	Book	Luxury	More info
4 January 1998	Professor Heinz Wolff	Collection of Landscape pictures (with book)	Collection of landscape pictures	more
11 January 1998	Paul Hogarth	The Times Atlas of World History	Solar-powered Apple Mac	more
18 January 1998	John Tomlinson	Flora and Fauna of tropical desert island	A box of lenses	more
25 January 1998	Helena Kennedy QC	Aeneid by Virgil	Goose down duvet	more
1 February 1998	Colin Dexter	The collected works of A. E. Housman	Manicure set	more
15 February 1998	Richard Noble	War and Peace by Leo Tolstoy	Guitar	more
22 February 1998	David Pountney	Anthology: The English Year by Geoffrey Grigson	Croquet lawn	more
1 March 1998	Archie Norman MP	The Compleat Angler by Isaac Walton	Jar of Marmite	more
8 March 1998	Sir Anthony Dowell	The Wind in the Willows by Kenneth Grahame	Sketch pad and paints	more
15 March 1998	Ian Stewart	Gödel, Escher, Bach by Douglas Hofstadter	Margaret Thatcher pickled in a Damien Hurst sculpture	more
22 March 1998	Andrew Motion	Prelude by William Wordsworth	Pencils and paper	more
29 March 1998	Alice Thomas Ellis	Come Hither – An Anthology by Walter de la Mare	Very comfortable sofa	more
5 April 1998	Gavin Bryars	Science and Civilisation in China by Joseph Needham	Gravity chair	more
12 April 1998	Dame Judi Dench	Ordnance Survey map of the world	The Man with a Glove, painting by Titian	more
19 April 1998	Sir Terry Frost	Blank sheets to write his thoughts on imagination and memory	Mirror	more
26 April 1998	Sir Ernest Hall	The collected works of William Blake	Piano	more
3 May 1998	Susan Blackmore	Origin of Species by Charles Darwin	Handful of cannabis seeds	more
10 May 1998	Antony Gormley	Principle of Hope by Ernst Bloch	Snorkel and mask	more
17 May 1998	Sir David Willcocks	Book on astronomy	King's College Chapel	more
24 May 1998	John Harle	The Aesthetics of Music by Roger Scruton	Lute and strings	more
7 June 1998	Geoffrey Smith	History of viticulture, with instructions on how to make wine	Bundle of prunings from a good vineyard so he can plant his own vines	more
14 June 1998	Bill Kenwright	Everton – The Complete Record by Steve Johnson	Guitar	more
21 June 1998	John Bird	The Encyclopaedia of London	Mont Blanc pen, notebook and ink	more
28 June 1998	Jack Rosenthal	Finnegans Wake by James Joyce	Clay for making sculpture	more
5 July 1998	Sybille Bedford	A la recherche du temps perdu by Marcel Proust	A French restaurant in full working order	more
12 July 1998	Jack Straw MP	The Franco Prussian War – The German Invasion of France 1870–1871 by Michael Howard	Saxophone	more
19 July 1998	Howard Brenton	The Canterbury Tales by Geoffrey Chaucer	Champagne	more
26 July 1998	Chris De Burgh	Moonfleet by J. Meade Falkner	Snorkel	more
2 August 1998	Ralph Steadman	The New La Rousse Encyclopaedia of Mythology	Chisels	more
9 August 1998	David Hempleman Adams	Jonathan Livingstone Seagull by Richard Bach	Saxophone	more
16 August 1998	Les Murray	A blank, lined book	Marble four-poster bed	more
23 August 1998	Ralph Koltai	French dictionary	Cigars	more
30 August 1998	Lucy Gannon	The Faber Book of Reportage by John Carey	Jaguar XK8	more
1 November 1998	Paul Daniel	Beautifully bound blank book	Cello and music for Bach's cello suites	more
8 November 1998	Joseph Rotblat	Encyclopædia Britannica on CD-ROM	Solar-powered laptop	more
15 November 1998	Nicole Kidman	Collected Poems of Emily Dickinson	Sun block	more
22 November 1998	Bill Morris	Long Walk to Freedom by Nelson Mandela	Cricket bat signed by "the three Ws" – Sir Frank Worrell, Everton Weekes and Clyde Walcott	more
29 November 1998	Eileen Atkins	Moments of Being by Virginia Woolf	An Atkinson Grimshaw painting	more
6 December 1998	John Keegan	The Thirty-Nine Steps by John Buchan	French-speaking man robot	more
13 December 1998	Dick Francis	Men and Horses I Have Known by George Lampton	Waterbed	more
20 December 1998	Bob Monkhouse	The Adventures of Alice by Lewis Carroll	Clarinet	more
25 December 1998	Sir David Attenborough	Shifts and Expedients of Camp Life by W. B. Lord	Guitar	more

== 1999 ==
Date	Castaway	Book	Luxury	More info
3 January 1999	Dave Brubeck	The Spear in the Sand by Raoul C. Faure	Grand piano	more
10 January 1999	Clare Hollingworth	History of England by G. M. Trevelyan	Paper and pens (with thick nibs)	more
17 January 1999	David Shepherd	Collected works of Beatrix Potter	Wind-up video player	more
24 January 1999	Ruth Prawer Jhabvala	The Brothers Karamazov by Fyodor Dostoyevsky	A chaise longue by a window	more
31 January 1999	Bill Bryson	The Lost Continent by Bill Bryson	Basketball and hoop with a little hard standing	more
7 February 1999	Andras Schiff	The Divine Comedy by Dante Alighieri	Piano	more
14 February 1999	Nina Cassian	Winnie the Pooh by A. A. Milne	Cigarettes and whisky	more
21 February 1999	Maria Ewing	Collected Poems of John Donne	Piano	more
28 February 1999	Richard Curtis	Guinness Book of Pop	Pizza Express in Notting Hill	more
7 March 1999	Sir Charles Mackerras	Translation of Shakespeare in either German, Italian or Czech	If a hot island – a huge bottle of suntan lotion and if a cold island – a pillow	more
14 March 1999	Fay Maschler	Cold Comfort Farm by Stella Gibbons	Huge supply of ouzo	more
21 March 1999	Mo Mowlam MP	The collected works of Seamus Heaney	Globe	more
28 March 1999	Luise Rainer	The Proper Study of Mankind by Isaiah Berlin	To be missed by the people she loves	more
4 April 1999	Richard Dunwoody	The Lord of the Rings by J. R. R. Tolkien	Endless supply of ice-cream	more
11 April 1999	Paco Peña	Anthology of poetry by Jose Bergua	Virtual reality module	more
18 April 1999	Ken Loach	Golden Treasury of English Songs and Lyrics by Francis Palgrave	Radio (for football results)	more
25 April 1999	Stan Tracey	Crazy Like A Fox by S. J. Perelman	The film – Oh, Mr Porter!	more
2 May 1999	Helen Bamber	Poet For Poet by Richard McCain	Radio to listen to the World Service	more
9 May 1999	Richard Dreyfuss	A Tale of Two Cities by Charles Dickens	Books delivered to the island on a regular basis	more
16 May 1999	Michael Green	The Complete Works of Sigmund Freud	Digital TV	more
23 May 1999	Christopher Bruce	Teach yourself French	Suncream	more
30 May 1999	Anthony Howard	Dictionary of National Biography	Magnifying glass	more
6 June 1999	Chris Bonington	History of the English-Speaking Peoples by Sir Winston Churchill	Power Book G3 (laptop computer)	more
13 June 1999	John Barry	Eternal Echoes by John O'Donohue	Grand piano	more
20 June 1999	James Dyson	Olive: The Life and Love of a Noble Fruit by Mort Rosenslum	Olive oil	more
27 June 1999	Ann Widdecombe MP	Collected Poems of Thomas Gray	Hot shower	more
4 July 1999	Igor Aleksander	Companions to the Mind by Richard Gregory	A virtual reality London Symphony Orchestra so he can conduct it	more
11 July 1999	Paddy Moloney	The Book of Lempster (old Irish textbook currently in The Hague)	Tin whistle	more
18 July 1999	Martin Pipe	Horse Management by R. S. Timmis	Winning post from Cheltenham race course	more
25 July 1999	Rod Steiger	Complete book of poetry by e e cummings	Self-contained external electric fan	more
1 August 1999	Rick Stein	Anna Karenina by Leo Tolstoy	Thai fish sauce	more
8 August 1999	Patricia Routledge	The collected works of John Donne	Tea service with tea	more
15 August 1999	Sir Roger Norrington	The Complete Works of Thomas Hardy	Chocolate	more
22 August 1999	Rita Dove	One Hundred Years of Solitude by Gabriel García Márquez	Ballroom and robotic dance instructor	more
29 August 1999	Rolf Harris	The Magic Pudding by Norman Lindsay	Chisel for sculpting	more
31 October 1999	Ralph Fiennes	A la recherche du temps perdu by Marcel Proust	Pen and limited supplies of ink and paper	more
7 November 1999	Willard White	The Power of Positive Thinking by Norman Vincent Peale	Seeds	more
19 November 1999	William Gibson	The Complete Works of Jorge Luis Borges	Junk yard	more
21 November 1999	Clarissa Dickson Wright	The Complete Works of Saki	Wind-up radio	more
28 November 1999	Warren Mitchell	Master and Commander by Patrick O'Brian	Organ (from the Royal Albert Hall)	more
5 December 1999	Sir Richard Sykes	Origin of Species by Charles Darwin	Telescope	more
12 December 1999	Oz Clarke	French Provincial Cookery by Elizabeth David	His memory	more
19 December 1999	Michael Nyman	Tristram Shandy by Laurence Sterne	Toilet	more
24 December 1999	Michael Crawford	The complete book of self-sufficiency by John Seymour	Pen and paper	more
31 December 1999	Sir Andrew Lloyd Webber	England's Thousand Best Churches by Simon Jenkins	Herb garden	more

== 2000 ==
Date	Castaway	Book	Luxury	More info
9 January 2000	Dr. Jane Goodall	The Lord of the Rings by J. R. R. Tolkien	Pencil and paper	more
16 January 2000	Ian McEwan	Ulysses by James Joyce	Italian leather hand-stitched hiking boots	more
23 January 2000	Neil Jordan	A la recherche du temps perdu by Marcel Proust	Typewriter	more
30 January 2000	Peter Melchett	Field guide to the island	Snorkel and mask	more
6 February 2000	Simon Callow	Dictionary	Nose hair trimmer	more
13 February 2000	Professor Stuart Hall	Portrait of a Lady by Henry James	Piano	more
20 February 2000	Michael Holroyd	The High Hill of the Muses (anthology by Hugh Kingsmill)	Waterbed	more
27 February 2000	Sheila Hancock	Anything by Marcel Proust	Grand piano (and music scores)	more
5 March 2000	Robert McCrum	Three Men in a Boat by Jerome K. Jerome	St. John's Wort	more
12 March 2000	Colin Montgomerie	Anything by Michael Crichton	No luxury chosen	more
19 March 2000	Al Alvarez	Interpretation of Dreams by Sigmund Freud	Laptop computer with poker game software	more
26 March 2000	Adrian Noble	The Art of Memory by Frances A Yates	Wine	more
2 April 2000	Harold Evans	History of the American Civil War by Shelby Foote	Silk pyjamas	more
9 April 2000	Claire Tomalin	The Diary of Samuel Pepys	Garden	more
16 April 2000	Sir Anthony Caro	War and Peace by Leo Tolstoy	Glue	more
23 April 2000	Leonard Slatkin	Notes of a Native Son by James Baldwin	Wine	more
30 April 2000	Sir Peter Bonfield	A book on celestial navigation	Windsurfer	more
7 May 2000	Sir John Mills	The Warden by Anthony Trollope	His piano	more
14 May 2000	Kathleen Turner	Emma by Jane Austen	Roses	more
21 May 2000	Dame Norma Major	Nine Tailors by Dorothy L. Sayers	Solar laptop	more
28 May 2000	John Bird	The collected works of Wallace Stevens	2,000 soft loo rolls	more
4 June 2000	Professor Géza Vermes	The Complete Works of Flavius Josephus	Comfortable armchair/desk	more
11 June 2000	Clive James	My Method of Singing by Enrico Caruso	Karaoke piano	more
18 June 2000	Donald Sutherland	Distant Mirror by Barbara Tuckman	Case of really good vintage wine	more
25 June 2000	Max Perutz	Origin of Species by Charles Darwin	Skis	more
2 July 2000	Peter Nichols	His diary (which he has kept since he was 18, to relive his life since 1945)	Cyanide tablet (if he can't a tower and telescope, or a full-size snooker table)	more
9 July 2000	Alan Parker	A giant photo album of his children and grandchildren which goes back over 20 years	Watercolour paint box plus brush and paint pads	more
16 July 2000	Michael Portillo	Proust: Time Regained by Alain de Botton	Solar-powered laptop	more
23 July 2000	Sir Roger Penrose	The biggest book by Michael Frayn	19-note piano	more
30 July 2000	General Sir Charles Guthrie	Volume 1 of biography of the Duke of Wellington – Year of the Sword by Lady Longford	Surfboard	more
6 August 2000	Sir Norman Wisdom	Reach for the Skies by Sir Douglas Bader	Pot of stew with two dumplings	more
13 August 2000	Robert Swan	Huge copy of The Times atlas – largest available so he can see where he has been (168 countries so far)	An accountancy course	more
20 August 2000	Christopher Lloyd	Letters of Gustave Flaubert	Syndicate whisky	more
27 August 2000	Ronald Harwood	Decline and Fall by Evelyn Waugh	His bathroom	more
5 November 2000	J K Rowling	SAS Survival Guide	Pen and unlimited paper	more
19 November 2000	Des Lynam	Encyclopaedia of Natural Medicine	Drum kit	more
26 November 2000	Albie Sachs	Charterhouse of Parma by Stendhal	Little bottle of aftershave	more
3 December 2000	Tina Brown	Middlemarch by George Eliot	Rollercoaster	more
10 December 2000	Tim Smit	Book with plain pages	Piano	more
17 December 2000	Richard Briers	Great Expectations by Charles Dickens	Huge supply of Chardonnay	more
24 December 2000	Professor Jocelyn Bell Burnell	The Brothers Karamazov by Fyodor Dostoyevsky	Book on how to sketch and some paper and pens	more
26 December 2000	Norman Painting	The Perennial Philosophy – Aldous Huxley	An orrary(sic) – an electronic toy for looking at the sky	more
31 December 2000	Stephen Sondheim	The collected works of E. B. White	Piano	more
