= Egghead =

American slang or epithet

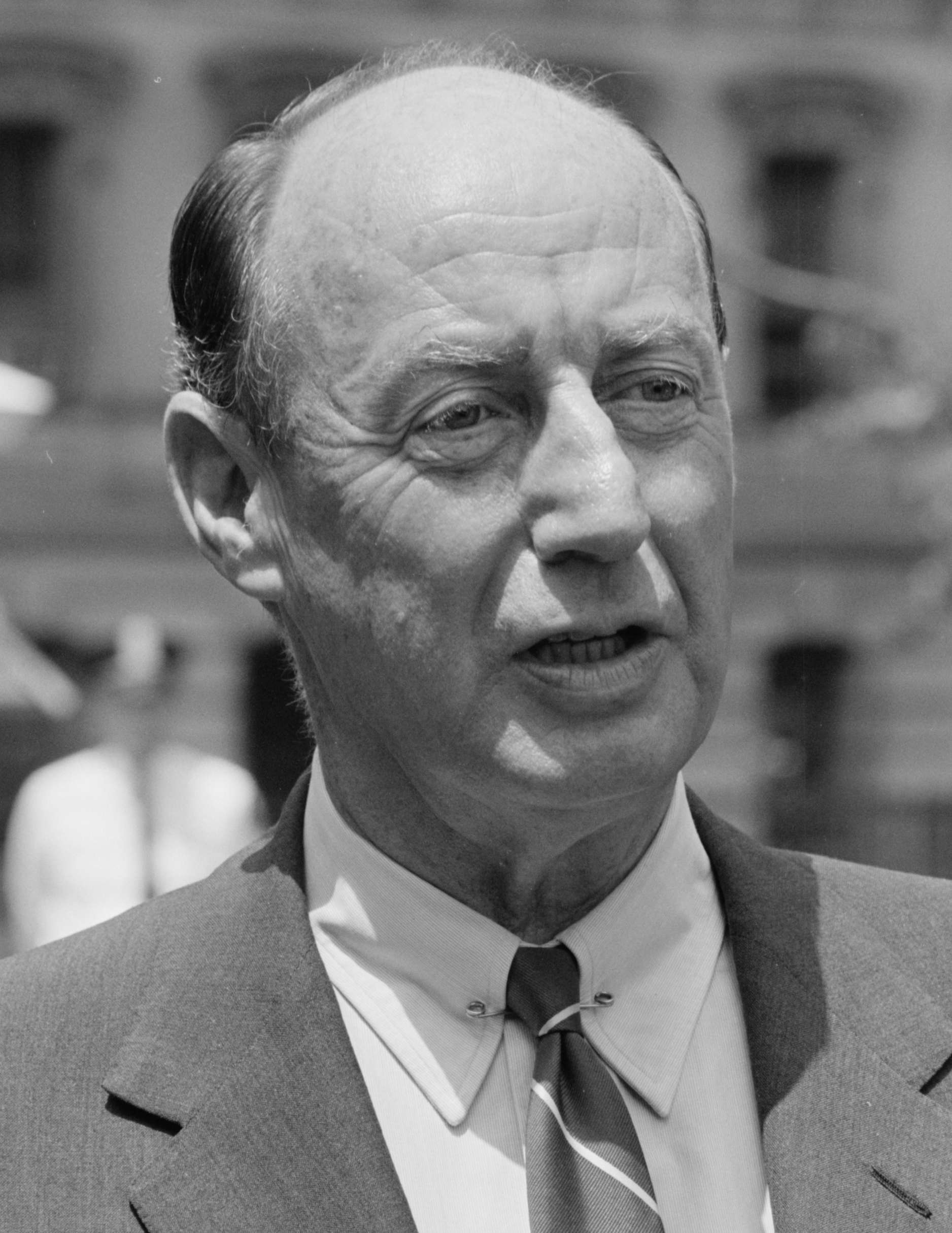
Adlai Stevenson was called an "egghead" by Richard Nixon during the 1952 U.S. presidential race.

In U.S. English slang, egghead is an epithet used to refer to intellectuals or people considered out-of-touch with ordinary people and lacking in realism, common sense, sexual interests, etc. on account of their intellectual interests. A similar, though not necessarily pejorative, British term is boffin. The term egghead reached its peak currency during the 1950s, when vice-presidential candidate Richard Nixon used it against Democratic Presidential nominee Adlai Stevenson. It was used by Bill Clinton advisor Paul Begala in the 2008 presidential campaign to describe Senator Barack Obama's supporters when he said, "Obama can't win with just the eggheads and African-Americans."

== Origins ==
In his Pulitzer Prize-winning historical essay on U.S. anti-intellectualism, historian Richard Hofstadter wrote: "During the campaign of 1952, the country seemed to be in need of some term to express that disdain for intellectuals which had by then become a self-conscious motif in U.S. politics. The word egghead was originally used without invidious associations, but quickly assumed them, and acquired a much sharper tone than the traditional highbrow. Shortly after the campaign was over, Louis Bromfield, a popular novelist of right-wing political persuasion, suggested that the word might someday find its way into dictionaries as follows:

Egghead: A person of spurious intellectual pretensions, often a professor or the protégé of a professor. Essentially confused in thought and immersed in mixture of sentimentality and violent evangelism. A doctrinaire supporter of Middle-European socialism as opposed to Greco-French-U.S. ideas of democracy and liberalism. Subject to the old-fashioned philosophical morality of Nietzsche which frequently leads him into jail or disgrace. A self-conscious prig, so given to examining all sides of a question that he becomes thoroughly addled while remaining always in the same spot. An anemic bleeding heart.

"The recent election," Bromfield remarked, "demonstrated a number of things, not the least of them being the extreme remoteness of the 'egghead' from the thought and feeling of the whole of the people"

— (Anti-Intellectualism in American Life [New York: Alfred A. Knopf, 1963], pp. 9-10).

In their Dictionary of American Slang (1960; 2nd supplemented ed. 1975), Harold Wentworth and Stuart Berg Flexner cite two earlier meanings of egghead, one referring to baldness, the other to stupidity. Wentworth and Flexner note that the meaning under discussion here was "[p]op. during presidential campaign of 1952 when the supporters of Adlai Stevenson, Democratic candidate, were called eggheads. Thus orig. the term carried the connotation of 'politically minded' and 'liberal'; today its application is more general. May have originated in ref. to the high forehead of Mr. Stevenson or of the pop. image of an academician" (p. 171).

Philip K. Dick claimed in a 1977 interview that, while researching his Nazi-themed novel The Man in the High Castle, he discovered that an equivalent term (Eierkopf) had been used by the Sturmabteilung because "when they attacked people who were defenseless, [...] their skulls cracked readily against the pavement".

== See also ==
- Atel (slang), another derogatory term for intellectuals, in Bengali culture.
- Geek, a related term for an obsessive enthusiast
- Nerd, another (sometimes) derogatory term for intellectuals, in American culture.
- Obrazovanshchina, another derogatory term for intellectuals, in Russian culture.
