= Harold Wentworth =

Harold Wentworth may refer to:

- Harold Wentworth (lexicographer) (1904-1965), American lexicographer
- Harold Wentworth (Days of Our Lives), minor character on the TV show Days of Our Lives from 2001 to 2003
