= Dictionary of American Slang =

Dictionary of English slang first published in 1960

The Dictionary of American Slang is an English slang dictionary. The first edition was edited by Stuart Flexner and Harold Wentworth and published in 1960 by Thomas Y. Crowell Company. After Wentworth's death in 1965, Flexner wrote a supplemented edition which was published in 1967. Flexner then wrote and published the 2nd supplemented edition in 1975. HarperCollins acquired Thomas Crowell Company in 1980 and took over publishing the dictionary. After Flexner passed 1990, Barbara Ann Kipfer and Robert L. Chapman took over the editing. The 3rd edition was published in 1995 and the 4th in 2007.

English professor Albert H. Marckwardt called the first edition a "highly useful work". He critiqued it for inconsistencies on what constitutes slang, but compared it favorably to Eric Partridge's Smaller Slang Dictionary because of the latter's lack of offensive terms. Linguistics professor Madeleine Mathiot criticized the exclusion of "fad" terms, which were omitted because the authors required two usages of a term separated by at least five years for it to be included.

The dictionary was banned from some schools in California in 1963 as part of larger concern with its potential obscenity, including concern from Los Angeles City Councilman John C. Holland. It was banned from certain schools in Colorado in 1981.
