= Geoffrey Barraclough =

English historian

- Born: 10 May 1908; Bradford, West Yorkshire, England
- Died: 26 December 1984 (aged 76); Burford, Oxfordshire, England
- Education: Oriel College, Oxford
- Occupation: Historian

Geoffrey Barraclough (10 May 1908 – 26 December 1984) was an English historian, known as a medievalist and historian of Germany.

== Biography ==
He was educated at Bootham School (1921–1924) in York and at Bradford Grammar School (1924–1925). He read History as an undergraduate at Oriel College, Oxford University in 1926–1929, spent the following two years studying in Munich and Rome, then returned to Oxford, to Merton College, where he was a Harmsworth Senior Scholar (1932-1934) and a Junior Research Fellow (1934-1936).

During the Second World War, in which he served in the Royal Air Force, Barraclough's sympathy for the USSR and public opposition to the Warsaw Uprising of 1944 drew the criticism of George Orwell, among others.

He was Professor of Medieval History, University of Liverpool, 1945–1956, in which period he lived in the Seneschal's House, Halton Village, Stevenson Research Professor, University of London, 1956–1962, University of California, 1965–1968, and Professor of History, Brandeis University, 1968–1970 and 1972–1981. He was Chichele Professor of Modern History, the University of Oxford from 1970 to 1973.

Barraclough began his career as a medievalist but developed into a contemporary global historian. He was deeply concerned about history's uses and relevance in the 20th century. It seemed to him that political debate and ultimately political decisions suffered from a lack of historical insight. To rectify this problem Barraclough developed historiographical methods for comparative history.

By anchoring study of the past at the origins of a historical investigation, while simultaneously researching contemporary areas most directly connected to that anchor research, his methods established comparisons between past and present. With this two-pronged research structure, Barraclough was able to organize his investigations by looking from the past forward and from the present backward. He sought historical threads that connect past to present while also observing the discontinuities that separate past from present.

In his writing, Barraclough turned to geography, social and economic cycles, empires, trade and tribes as historical units he felt most clearly connect the past to present or combine to end that continuity. Using these methods allowed him to sketch an outline of world history, identifying its ups, downs and turning points.

His first two books on historiography, History in a Changing World and An Introduction to Contemporary History are collections of essays. With scholarly authority, Barraclough served as editor of The Times Atlas of World History, which continues to be revised. He was also General Editor for the popular "Library of European Civilization" series, published by Thames and Hudson from 1965 with many notable contributors.

== Works ==
- Public Notaries and the Papal Curia (1934)
- Papal Provisions: Aspects of Church History Constitutional, Legal and Administrative in the Later Middle Ages (1935)
- Factors in German History (1946)
- The Origins of Modern Germany (1946)
- Mediaeval Germany 911 - 1250 (1948) essays by German historians, translator
- Crown, Community and Parliament in the Later Middle Ages: Studies in English Constitutional History by Gaillard T. Lapsley (1951) editor with Helen M. Cam
- The Earldom and County Palatine of Chester (1953)
- History in a Changing World (1955)
- Survey of International Affairs, 1955-1956 (1960) with Rachel F. Wall
- Social Life in Early England (1960)
- Survey of International Affairs, 1956-1958 (1962)
- European Unity in Thought and Action (1963) Vogelenzang Lecture
- Survey of International Affairs, 1959-1960 (1964)
- An Introduction to Contemporary History (1964)
- The Mediaeval Empire - Idea and Reality (1964)
- The Historical Association, 1906-1966 (1967) Presidential Address
- The Medieval Papacy (1968) from the "Library of European Civilization" series
- Eastern and Western Europe in the Middle Ages (1970) from the "Library of European Civilization" series
- Management in a Changing Economy (1976)
- The Crucible of Europe: The Ninth and Tenth Centuries in European History (1976) later as The Crucible of the Middle Ages
- The Times Atlas of World History (1978)
- Main Trends in History (1978)
- The Turning Points in World History (1979)
- The Christian World: A Social and Cultural History of Christianity (1981)
- The Times Concise Atlas of World History (1982)
- From Agadir to Armageddon: Anatomy of a Crisis (1982)
- Charters of the Anglo-Norman Earls of Chester, c.1071-1237 (1988)
- Atlas of World History (1989) with Norman Stone, and later editions and atlases
- The Times History of the World (2001) with Richard Overy
