= Gang box =

Toolbox for access by multiple workers

Gangbox (also gang box) is a colloquial term utilized in the construction industry, referring to a toolbox or workbox that can be accessed by multiple workers.

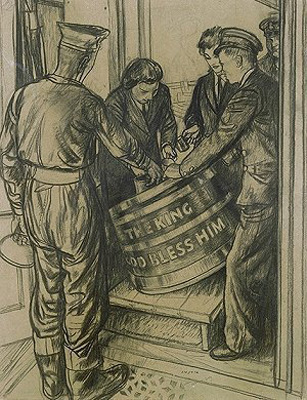
Sailors receiving their daily rum ration

== Origin ==
The word gangbox may have been derived for several reasons. Firstly, "gang" can be used to refer to the group of tools utilized for a particular project, thus making the receptacle in which they are stored the "gang box". Secondly, a gang can refer to a group of workmen or tradesmen, hence the name for where their materials or tools are kept is the gang's box.

The boxes are known for their rugged design and tough security. Sailors would store important tools in secure lockers that were easily accessed by the crew but tough enough to survive unwanted access from pirates and criminals "that box is so tough it can keep out all the gangs"
