= Obrazovanshchina =

Russian term

Obrazovanshchina (Russian: образованщина, 'educationdom', 'educaties', 'smatterers') is a Russian ironical, derogatory term for a category of people with superficial education who lack the higher ethics of an educated person.

The term was introduced by Alexander Solzhenitsyn in his 1974 essay "Obrazovanshchina" (translated as "The Smatterers") as a criticism of the transformation of the Russian intelligentsia, which, in his opinion had lost high ethical values. The essay and the term caused criticism from liberal intelligentsia, such as Solzhenitsyn's long-time opponent Grigory Pomerants and Boris Shragin, as well as being among the reasons of the bitter contention between Solzhenitsyn and the Russian "third wave" of emigration (of dissidents).

Wykształciuchy is a similar term used in Poland, a country that shares the concept of 'intelligentsia' with Russia.

Solzhenitsyn defines obrazovanshchina as the category of people who refer to themselves as "intelligentsia" solely on the basis of having a higher than middle education. Solzhenitsyn explains the selection of the term by reference to Vladimir Dahl's dictionary, which distinguished the terms образовать ('to educate') and просвещать ('to enlighten'), the former concept having a superficial character, "external gloss."

A similar criticism of Russian intelligentsia came from Nikolai Berdyaev, who coined the ironic word intelligentshchina for the part of intelligentia locked in their own world, isolated from the rest of the Russian society.

== See also ==
- Atel (slang)
- Egghead, a derogatory term criticizing other aspects of educated people
- Wykształciuch, Polish wiki
