= Repair kit =

Collection of tools and spares

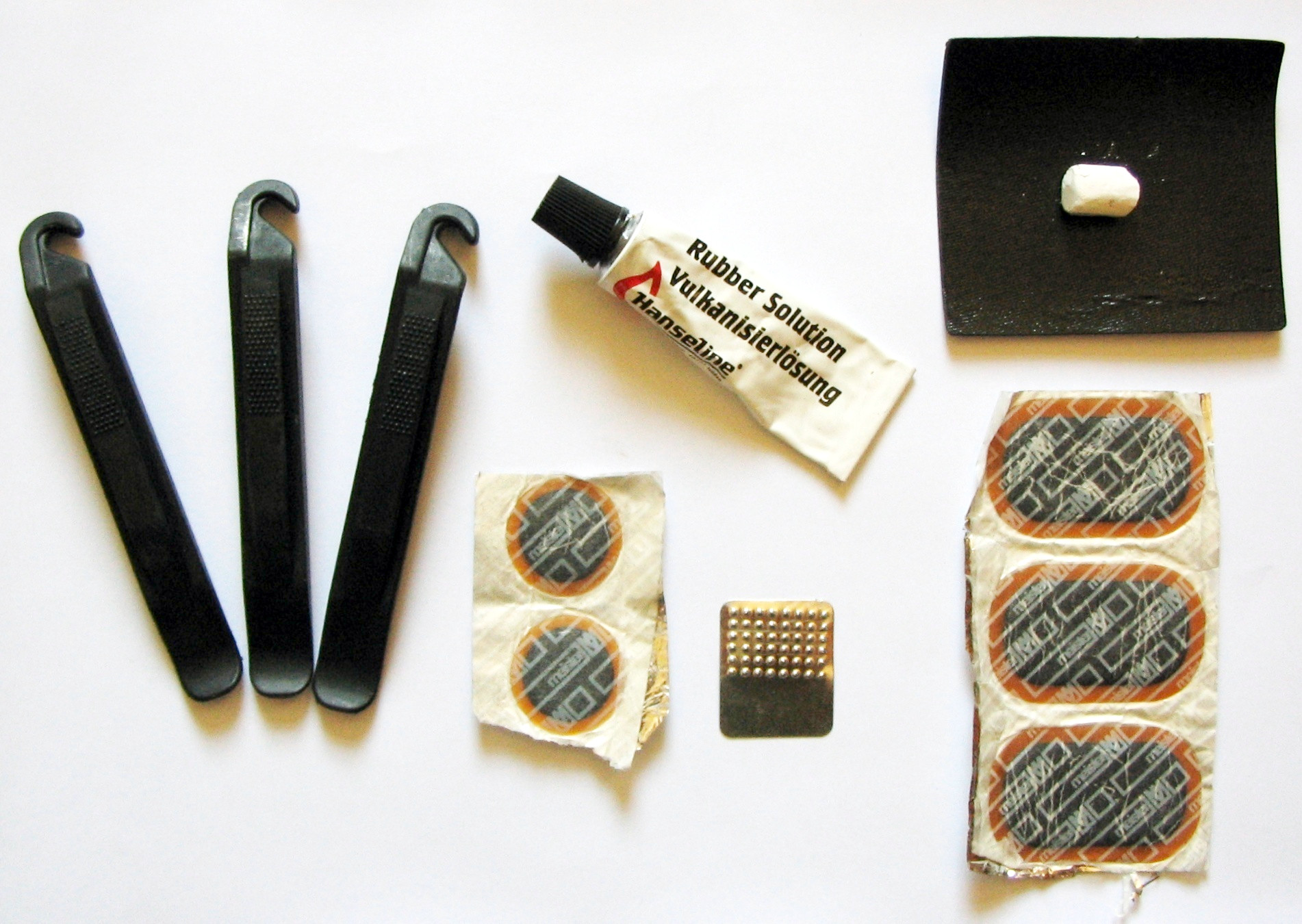
Puncture repair kit with tire levers, sandpaper to clean off an area of the inner tube around the puncture, a tube of rubber solution (vulcanizing fluid), round and oval patches, a metal grater and piece of chalk to make chalk powder (to dust over excess rubber solution). Kits often also include a wax crayon to mark the puncture location.

A repair kit or service kit is a set of items used to repair a device, commonly comprising both tools and spare parts. Many kits are designed for vehicles, such as cars, boats, airplanes, motorbikes, and bicycles, and may be kept with the vehicle in order to make on-the-spot repairs. Some are considered essential safety equipment, and may be included survival kits. In the military, personnel crossing large water bodies in aircraft may be equipped with a raft and raft repair kit. Other kits, such as those for watch repair or specific engine components, are used by professionals. Depending on the type, a repair kits may be included when buying a product, or may be purchased separately.

== Examples ==
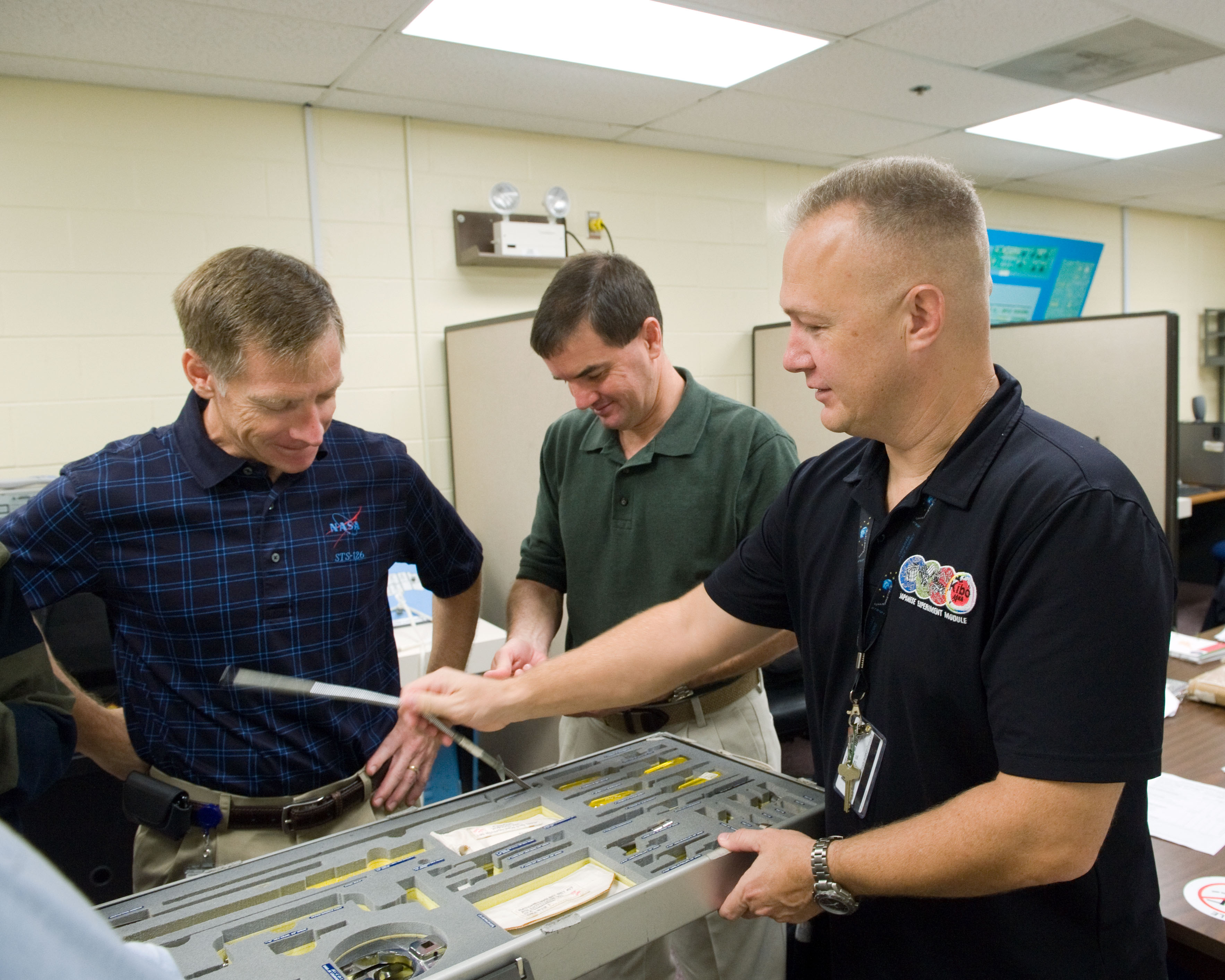
NASA astronauts Chris Ferguson (left), STS-135 commander; Doug Hurley (right), pilot, and Rex Walheim, mission specialist, participate in a tools and repair kits training session in the Space Vehicle Mockup Facility at NASA's Johnson Space Center.

Road vehicles often include basic tools and spare parts which commonly fail. A bicycle repair kit, for example, normally contains tools as well as patches and glue to repair a punctured tire. Other kits that include patches and glue are used to fix holes in fabric items such as inflatable boats and tents.

Watercraft normally contain both safety equipment and repair kits as part of their emergency equipment.

Some automobiles, such as the Mitsubishi i-MiEV, have an optional repair kit available. The Mercedes-Benz OM604 engine has an optional repair kit to help replace seals. The 1905 Gale Model A came with a repair kit.

In aerospace, kits have been developed for repairing the thermal protection tiles on the Space Shuttle and to fix space suits.

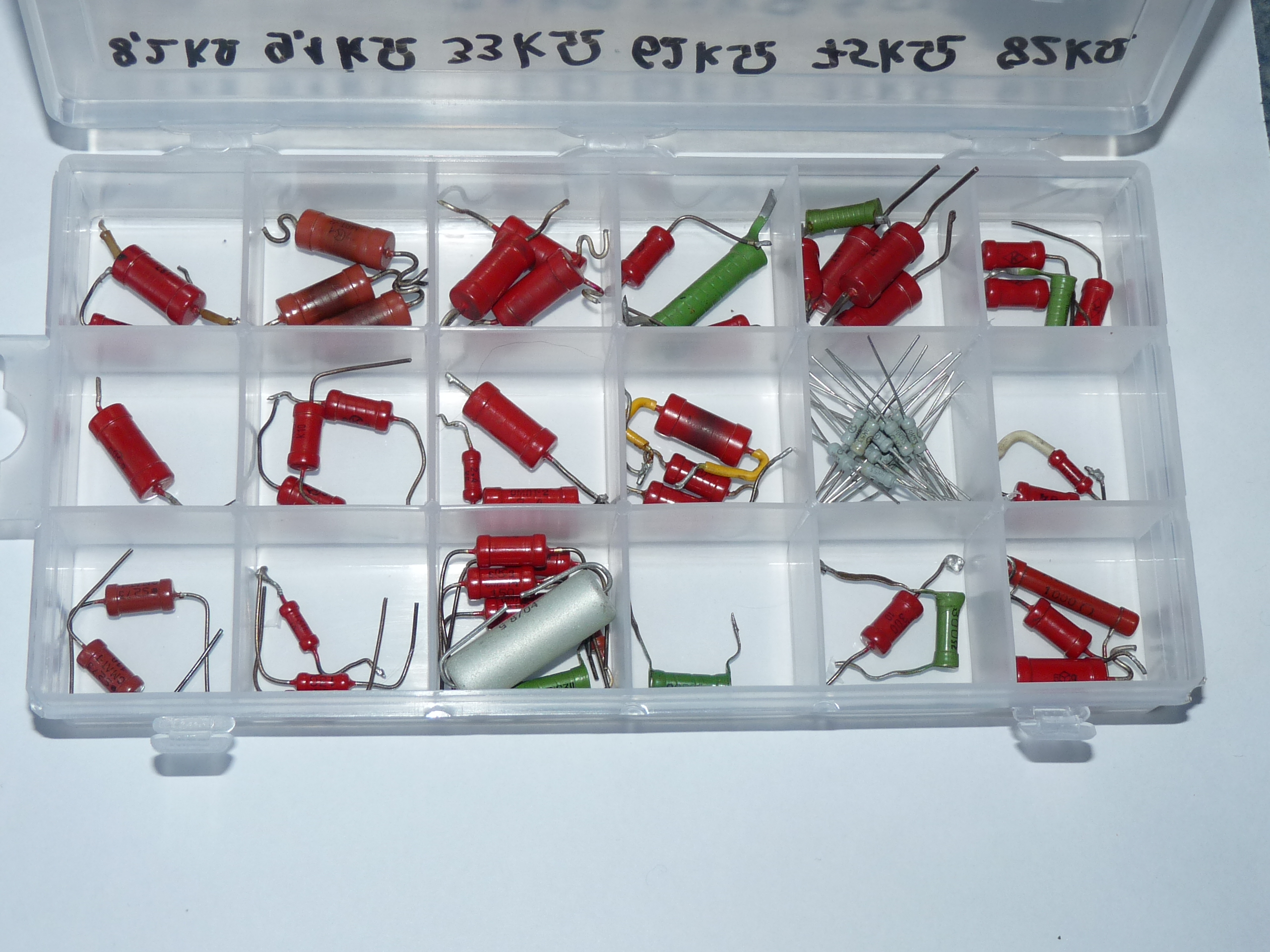
An electronics repair kit including different resistors

Professionals who repair and maintain electronic equipment may have a kit containing a soldering iron, wire, and components such as transistors and resistors.

In medicine, a repair kit consisting of a plug and plastic mesh may be used during inguinal hernia surgery.

A particular trade may use a repair kit as part of normal work, such as in watch repair and at automobile repair shops.

== Components ==
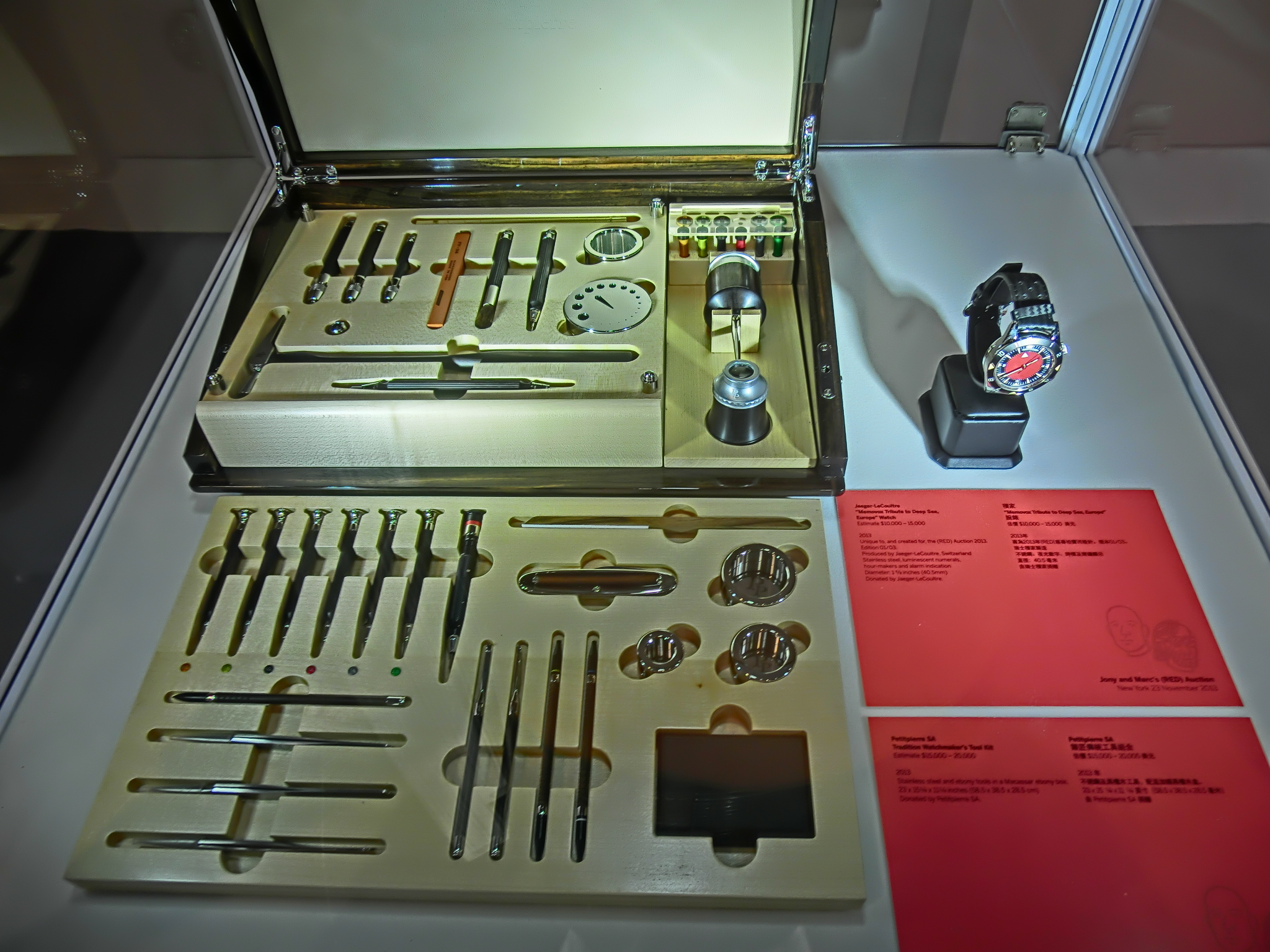
A watch repair kit

A wide variety of tools and replacement parts may be included in a repair kit. Some common examples include screwdriver, spare tire, jumper cable, and duct tape.

== Tire Mobility Kit ==
A tire mobility kit is a package of equipment and accessories used for repairing vehicle tires. Hence, they are also called a tire repair kit or a tire inflator. The idea of a mobility kit is to have a small group of tools that are compact and easy to use. It benefits by taking up much less room in a trunk than even a temporary spare tire. An air compressor with a connected hose and a thick sealant container is generally included in the package. And, the most attractive thing about these kits is that they barely weigh 1-2 pounds. So, carrying them doesn’t get any easier.

== See also ==
- Maintenance, repair, and operations
- Preventive maintenance
- Scheduled maintenance
- Ten Essentials, survival items that hiking and scouting organizations recommend for safe travel in the backcountry
- Toolbox
