= Organizer box =

Storage with sorting compartments

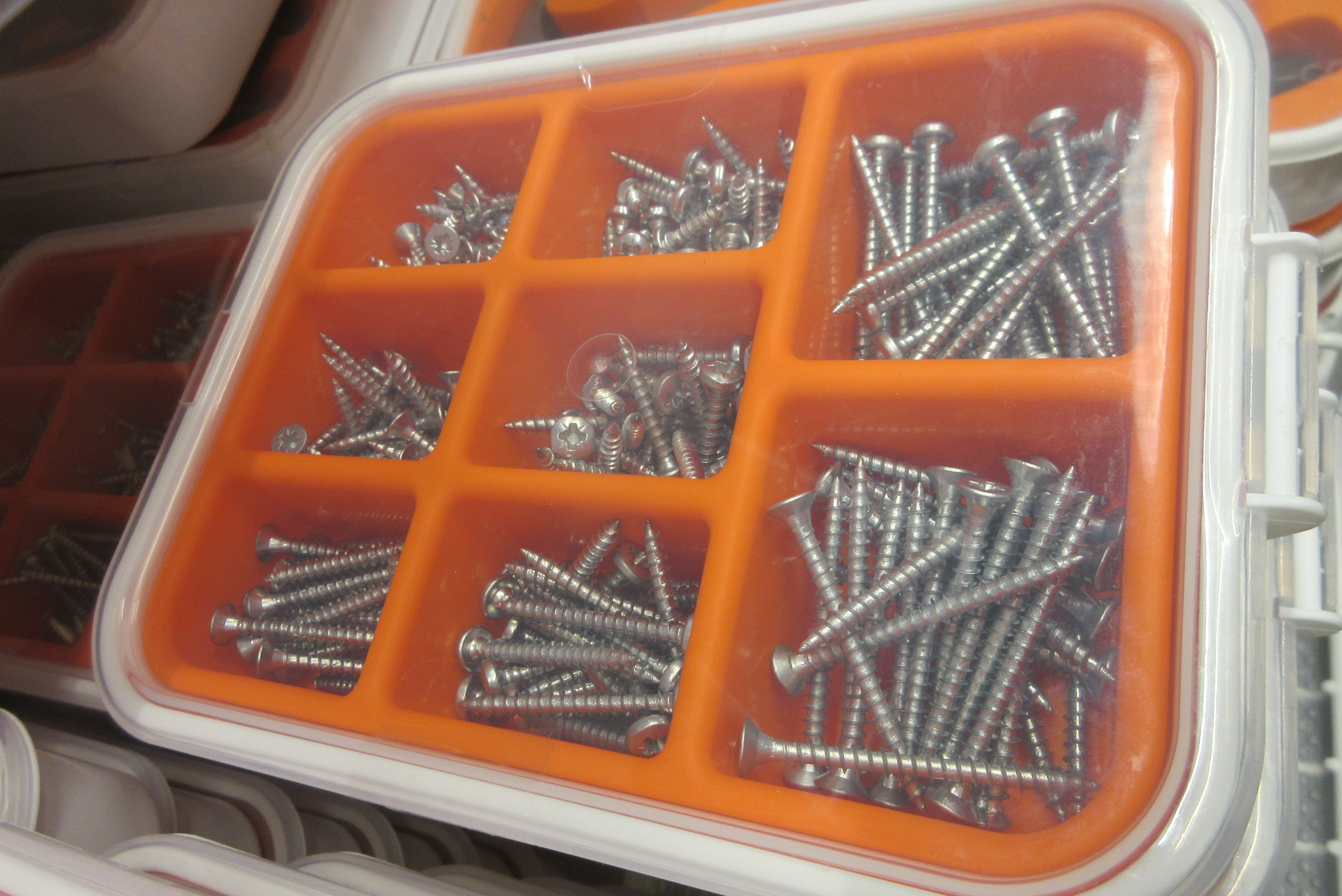
Screw box

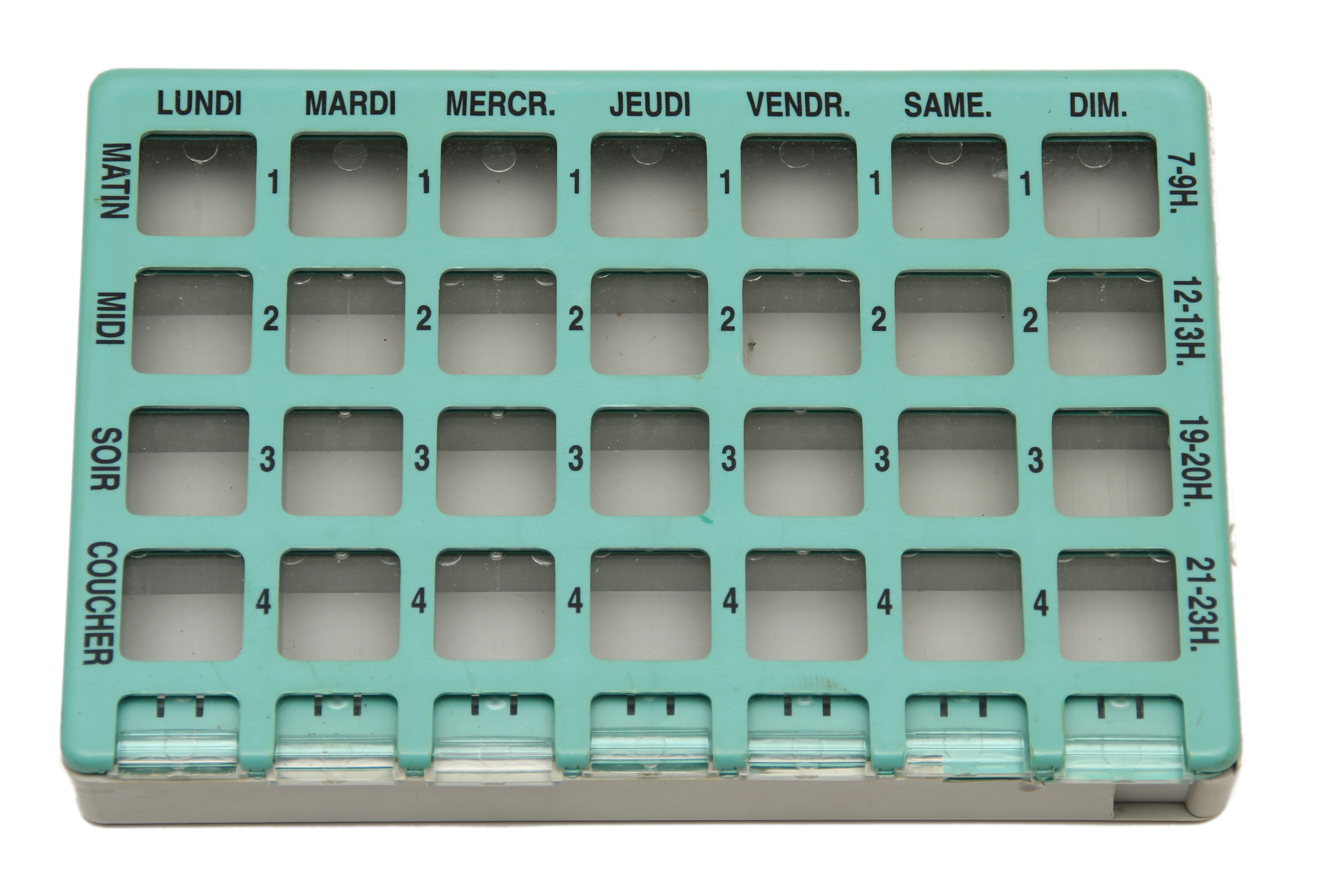
Pill organizer

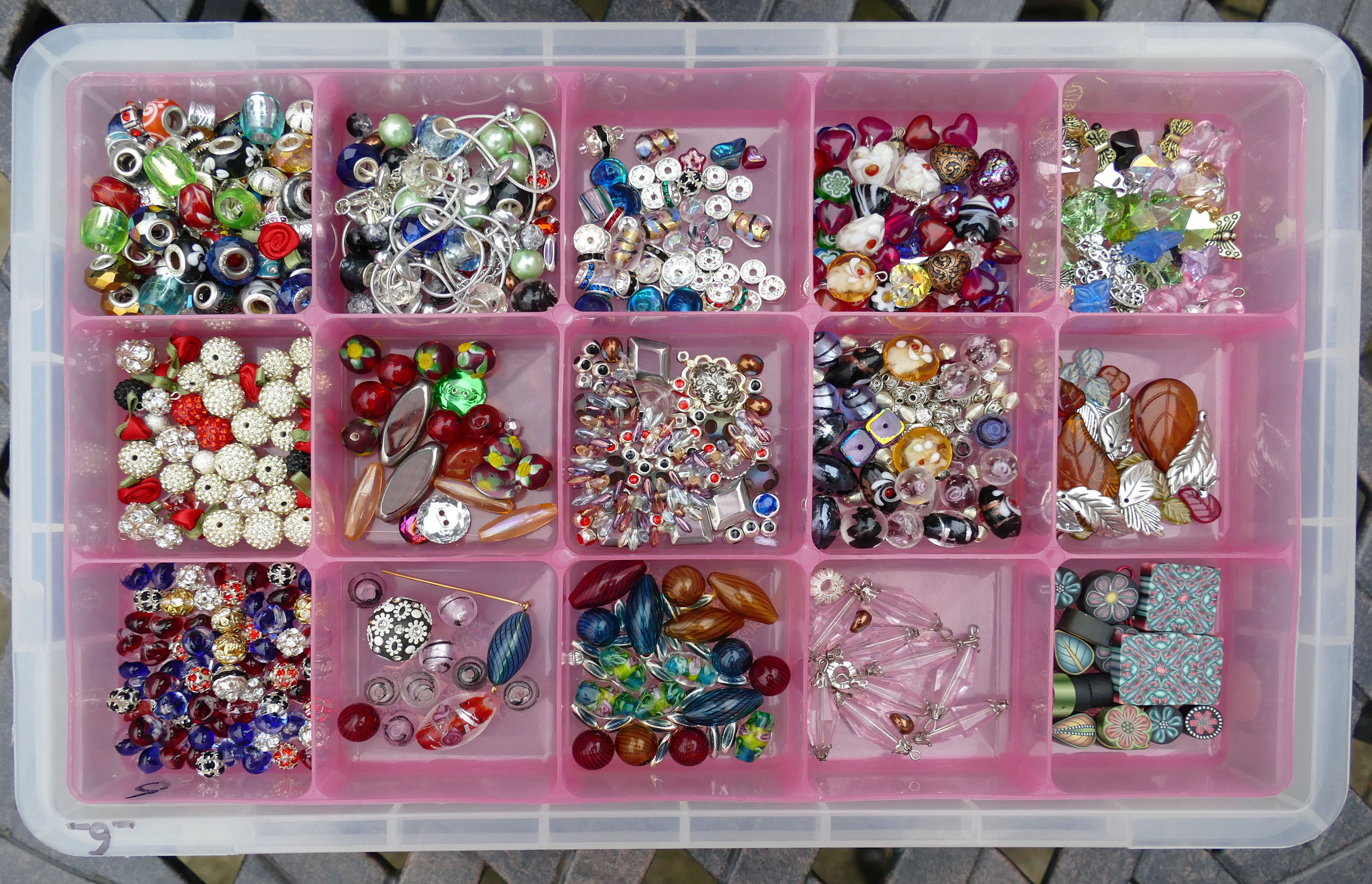
Bead organizer box

An organizer box or compartment storage box is a type of storage box featuring small compartments for sorting components like screws, nails, bolts, washers or pills, etc. The compartments can be separated by removable dividers. The boxes are typically made of a translucent plastic to help determine the compartment contents before lifting the lid.

Types of organizer boxes:

- Screw boxes
- Drawer storage cabinet
- Pill organizers

== See also ==
- Toolbox
