= Atel (slang) =

Bengali slang for intellectuals

Ā̃tel (Bengali: আঁতেল) is Bengali term referring to a person who is proficient in academic practice but lacks practical knowledge, or someone who pretends to be intelligent.

== Use ==
According to Indian author Nrisingha Prasad Bhaduri, winner of the Sahitya Akademi Award,

"The word intellectual is firstly found in the Indian scripture Mahabharata, in the event the Bachelorette meeting (Swayamvara Sabha) of Draupadi. Immediately after Arjuna and Raja-Maharaja (kings-emperors) came to the meeting, Nipuna Buddhijeevina (perfect intellectuals) appeared at the meeting. He described the character of Karna of Mahabharata as Ā̃tel. According to him, "I can all understand the "I can do everything" mentality of tha Karna, we manifest the ego in his behavior. On the battlefield, Dushasana died, but Karna could not do anything, yet he advised Duryodhana not to be anxious. Yet today, where there is the trend of being middlemen doing nothing, so the meaning of the word Atel has gradually changed to us."

In the May 2017, the Prime Minister of Bangladesh Sheikh Hasina said in the session of parliament pointing towards the rescued social activist and author Farhad Mazhar after the disappearance:

"One of our renowned Ā̃tel disappeared as to be kidnapped. Later we saw that he was not kidnapped. He himself went to Khulna. Later he was found. (They claim) this fault is ours. There are many more such cases happening. I do not want to say his name."

Former chairman of the Department of Language Studies of Shahjalal University of Science and Technology, Shafiuddin Ahmed said in response to the question of "how much our generation is progressive":

"Our boys and girls are more meritorious than boys and girls of other countries. You see, when they goes out, there in the case of studying, innovation, entrepreneur, they keep the sign of good credit. But they are not able to do it here, because we can not teach them that ourselves. When a nation's teachers, artists, writers, poets, intellectuals become Ā̃tel, party-oriented, and dependant, then, the nation becomes damaged. We are now passing that time, so our generation is being damaged."

Indian film director Raj Chakraborty, in his interview, mentioned the word in the answer of "what types of films will you use to choose to make as a producer", he said,

"Since I am now making historical and children's movie instead commercial films, I will choose to produce commercial films as a producer. The director of this type of film is few in number. Over that, I don't enjoy much the Urban Ā̃tel films. Whatever people think negatively, but over all I am the son of a small-town. I grew up watching the commercial pictures. Yet I like to see the typical Bollywood masala movies. Hence, I would much like to invest in commercial movies."

== See also ==
- Egghead
- Obrazovanshchina
