= Stuart Berg Flexner =

American lexicographer (1928–1990)

Stuart Berg Flexner (1928–1990) was a lexicographer, editor and author, noted for his books on the origins of American words and expressions, including I Hear America Talking and Listening to America; as co-editor of the Dictionary of American Slang and as chief editor of the Random House Dictionary, Second Edition.

== Personal life ==
Flexner was the son of clothing retailer David Flexner and Gertrude, née Berg. He was twice married, first to Miriam Bogen and then to Doris Louise Hurcomb.

== Bibliography ==
- How to Increase Your Word Power (1971)
- Family Word Finder: A New Thesaurus of Synonyms and Antonyms in Dictionary Form (1975)
- I Hear America Talking: An Illustrated Treasury of American Words and Phrases (1976)
- Listening to America: An Illustrated History of Words and Phrases from our Lively and Splendid Past (1982)
- Dictionary of American Slang, with Harold Wentworth (editions 1960, 1967, 1975)
- Oxford American Dictionary, with Eugene H. Ehrlich, Gorton Carruth, Joyce M. Hawkins (1980)
- The Random House Thesaurus, with Jess Stein (1984)
- The Pessimist's Guide To History : An Irresistible Compendium Of Catastrophes, Barbarities, Massacres And Mayhem From The Big Bang To The New Millennium, with Doris Flexner (1992) 2nd edition (2000) 3rd edition (2008)
- The Random House Dictionary of the English Language, Unabridged, Second Edition, editor (1987)
- Wise Words and Wives' Tales: The Origins, Meanings and Time-Honored Wisdom of Proverbs and Folk Sayings Olde and New, (1993)
- Speaking Freely: A Guided Tour of American English from Plymouth Rock to Silicon Valley, with Anne H. Soukhanov (1997)
