= Barbara Ann Kipfer =

American linguist

Barbara Ann Kipfer (born 1954) is a lexicographer, linguist, ontologist, and part-time archaeologist. She has written more than 70 books and calendars, including 14,000 Things to be Happy About (Workman), which has more than 1.5 million copies in print. The 25th anniversary edition of the book was published in 2014. She is the editor of Roget's International Thesaurus 5th-8th editions.

Kipfer holds an MPhil and PhD in linguistics (University of Exeter), a PhD in archaeology (Greenwich University), an MA and PhD in Buddhist Studies (Akamai University), and a BS in Physical Education (Valparaiso University). She is a Registered Professional Archaeologist.

Kipfer is senior lexicographer of Zeta Global.

== Works ==
- Roget's International Thesaurus, New York: HarperCollins; 8th Ed., 2019
- The Happiness Diary, Beverly MA: Fair Winds, 2019
- Natural Meditation, New York: Helios, July 2018
- 1,001 Ways to Be Creative, Washington DC: National Geographic, 2018
- 1,001 Ways to Slow Down, Washington DC: National Geographic, 2017
- Color Your Happy Home with Durell Godfrey, New York: Harlequin, 2017
- How Would Buddha Think?, San Francisco: New Harbinger, 2016
- 14,000 Things to be Happy About Page a Day Calendar 2017, New York: Workman, 2016
- 1,001 Ways to Live Wild, Washington DC: National Geographic Books, 2016
- How Would Buddha Act?, San Francisco: New Harbinger, 2016
- What Would Buddha Say?. New Harbinger, 2014.
- Breath Perception. Skyhorse, 2014, ISBN 9781629143682.
- It's Good to Talk: More Than 10,000 Questions to Ask and Think About (e-book). 2013.
- A Commonplace Book (e-book). 2012.
- Smiles: 8,000 Sunny-Side-Up Thoughts (e-book). 2012.
- Good Nature (e-book). 2011.
- Life Needs a Menu: A Foodie List (e-book). 2011.
- The Culinarian: A Kitchen Desk Reference. Houghton Mifflin Harcourt, 2011, ISBN 047055424X
- Introduction to Lexicography (e-book). 2010.
- Kipfer's Lists (e-book). 2010.
- Things for Kids to Do (e-book). 2010.
- The Next Order of Things: Cycles, Sequences, & Processes (e-book). 2010.
- The Buddha's Lists (e-book). 2008.
- Time Capsule: Things to be Nostalgic About (e-book). 2008.
- Instant Karma. Workman, 2003, ISBN 0761128042.
- Roget’s Descriptive Word Finder. Writer's Digest, 2003.
- Roget’s Thesaurus of Phrases. Writer's Digest, 2001.
- 8,789 Words of Wisdom. Workman, 2001, ISBN 076111730X.
- Flip Dictionary. Writer's Digest, 2000.
- Encyclopedic Dictionary of Archaeology. Springer, 2000.
- 5,001 Things for Kids to Do. Plume, 2000.
- The Wish List. Workman, 1997, ISBN 0761107568.
- The Order of Things. Random House, 1997.

A reference compilation outlining its contents in thirteen areas of classification; it contains schematic illustrations, dates, and numerous lists.

- USA Today Crossword Puzzle Dictionary. Hyperion, 1996.
- Dictionary of American Slang, contributor to 3rd edition, HarperCollins, 1995, ISBN 006270107X.
- 1,400 Things for Kids to be Happy About. Workman, 1994, ISBN 1563052385.
- Bartlett's Book of Business Quotations. Little, Brown, 1994, ISBN 0316082910.
- Bartlett's Book of Love Quotations. Little, Brown, 1994, ISBN 0316082929.
- Sisson's Word and Expression Locater, revised 2nd edition. Prentice-Hall, 1994, ISBN 013814088X.
- 21st Century Manual of Style. Dell/Laurel, 1993, ISBN 0440504899.
- 21st Century Spelling Dictionary. Dell/Laurel, 1993, ISBN 0440212324.
- 21st Century Synonym and Antonym Finder. Dell/Laurel, 1993, ISBN 0440213231.
- Random House Kid’s Encyclopedia. Knowledge Adventure, 1993
- Roget's 21st Century Thesaurus in Dictionary Form. Dell, 1992, ISBN 0440503868.
- 14,000 Things to be Happy About. Workman, 1990, ISBN 0894803700.
- Workbook on Lexicography. University of Exeter Press, 1984, ISBN 0859892603.
