= The Times Atlas of World History =

Series of books since 1978

The Times Complete History of the World (Ninth Edition)
- The ninth edition as The Times Complete History of the World
- Editor: Richard Overy
- Language: English
- Genre: Atlas, History
- Publisher: Times Books Limited
- Publication date: October 2015
- Publication place: United Kingdom
- Media type: Print (Hardback with slipcase)
- Pages: 432
- ISBN: 978-0-00-815026-6

The Times Atlas of World History (First Edition)
- The first edition cover
- Author: Geoffrey Barraclough
- Language: English
- Genre: Atlas, History
- Publisher: Times Books Limited
- Publication date: 1978
- Publication place: United Kingdom
- Media type: Print (Hardback)
- Pages: 360
- ISBN: 0-8437-1125-6
- OCLC: 10526520

The Times Atlas of World History is a historical atlas first published by Times Books Limited, then a subsidiary of Times Newspapers Ltd and later a branch of Collins Bartholomew, which is a subsidiary of HarperCollins, and which in the latest editions has changed names to become The Times Complete History of the World. The first two editions were created by Barry Winkleman, the editorial director of Times Atlases and Managing Director of Times Books. They were edited by the Oxford Chichele Professor of Modern History Geoffrey Barraclough. It contains large full color plates and commentary on each map or set of maps. Includes approximately 600 maps covering the date span of 3000 BCE to 1975. It has been revised and reprinted for many times and the latest edition is the ninth edition, published in 2015, and reflects on the modern world up to the 21st Century.

== Content ==
It contains seven sections:

- The world of early man
- The first civilisations
- The classical civilisations of Eurasia
- The world of divided regions
- The world of emerging West
- The age of European dominance
- The age of global civilisation

The book is prefaced with an eleven page "World Chronology" which is quick-view timeline across general geographic regions. It is suffixed with a Glossary (38 pages), helpful in cross-referencing names and places, and an index (26 pages).

Each section is further divided into given subjects and contain between one and nine maps, charts to show economic, demographic, manufactures, agricultural output, drug trade and other data as needed. Occasionally illustrations are included on a topic.

In the introduction to the first edition, Geoffrey Barraclough notes that the desire of The Atlas was to provide a history based on the viewpoint of its creators, hence the spread of Islam, for example, is centred at Mecca, as might have been the view of the seventh century Arabs.

== Publication information ==
The Atlas, first published in 1978 in London, UK, sold more than two million copies in many languages. Its stated aim was to describe the major processes and events of world history across a broad canvas and omit tiny details of, say, ruling families, minor battles etc. It wished to give a dynamic view of population migrations, economic developments such as agriculture and industrialisation, wars, the spread of religions and political ideologies.

It was created by Barry Winkleman, the Publishing Director of The Times, and Geoffrey Barraclough, Chichele Professor of Modern History at Oxford University. They assembled a team of some 100 leading historians.

Following the death of Geoffrey Barraclough in 1984, three other editors have since edited the atlas. The third edition was edited by Norman Stone, then Geoffrey Parker for the fourth, and Richard Overy for the fifth to the present ninth edition. Also, since the fifth edition the atlas was fully updated with digitalized maps and is renamed The Times Complete Atlas of World History, along with its smaller version of The Times Compact History of the World, previously known as The Times Concise Atlas of World History.

=== Editions ===
Edited by Geoffrey Barraclough

- 1st edition, 1978, (Revisions, 1979; 3rd Imp), 1980 (4th Imp), 1981, 1983
- 2nd edition, 1984, 1985, 1986 (Revisions), 1988

Edited by Norman Stone

- 3rd edition, 1989, 1992 (Revisions)

Edited by Geoffrey Parker

- 4th edition, 1993, 1994, 1996, 1997

Edited by Richard Overy as The Times Complete History of the World

- 5th edition, 1999, 2000, 2001, 2002, 2003
- 6th edition, 2004, 2005, 2006
- 7th edition, 2007, 2008
- 8th edition, 2010
- 9th edition, 2015

=== Reviews ===
In the latest eighth edition of The Times Complete History of the World, Harvard historian Niall Ferguson stated that the atlas "conveys a sense not only of time, but also of place"; while English journalist and presenter Jon Snow commented that "in the internet age, proof positive that this reference book still has the edge by a considerable margin".
