= Anti-intellectualism in the United States =

There is a cult of ignorance in the United States, and there has always been. The strain of anti-intellectualism has been a constant thread winding its way through our political and cultural life, nurtured by the false notion that democracy means that 'my ignorance is just as good as your knowledge'.

— Isaac Asimov, 1980

Anti-intellectualism in the United States is a range of skepticism, mistrust or criticism of intellect, intellectuals, and intellectualism throughout the United States. It is commonly expressed as questioning the value or relevance of intellectual pursuits. According to historian Richard Hofstadter in his 1963 book Anti-intellectualism in American Life, anti-intellectualism stems from populism, business-style pragmatism, evangelicalism, and political scapegoating.

In Alexis de Tocqueville's Democracy in America, he offers a classic early diagnosis of tendencies that later readers interpret as American anti-intellectualism: a culture that privileges practical utility, mass opinion, and equality of condition over reflection, intellectual independence, and elite judgment.

== Causes ==
=== Christianity ===
Christianity has largely been used for anti‑intellectualism when its theological resources, populist traditions, institutional structures, and political alliances are deployed to valorize intuitive faith over critical inquiry.

Hofstadter saw anti-intellectual themes as historically embedded in America's national fabric, resulting from its colonial history and Puritan heritage. He contended that evangelical American Protestantism's anti-intellectual tradition valued the spirit over intellectual rigor.

A 2019 Gallup poll found that 40% of American adults believed in creationism.

Faith healing is the practice of using prayer and gesture to seek divine intervention for physical healing. A major academic review of cases from 1975 to 1995 found 172 child deaths in the U.S. where parents relied on religious healing instead of medical care.

=== Pragmatism ===
Hofstadter argued American philosophical pragmatism (associated with thinkers like William James and John Dewey) can be interpreted as reinforcing a preference for what works over abstract theory.

=== Populism ===
Hofstadter believed populist egalitarianism celebrates the "common man" as morally and politically equal to any elite. It rejects hierarchical expertise in favor of widespread participation and practical wisdom.

== Examples of anti-intellectualism among American presidents ==
Andrew Jackson elevated the common man in his philosophy of Jacksonian democracy, vilifying lawyers and bankers as out-of-touch with the common people.

Woodrow Wilson expressed worry by rule of technocrats as governor of New Jersey.

What I fear is a government of experts. God forbid that, in a democratic country, we should resign the task and give the government over to experts. What are we for if we are to be scientifically taken care of by a small number of gentlemen who are the only men who understand the job?

Lyndon B. Johnson has been accused of anti‑intellectual posturing at times to shore up his common man image. His anti‑intellectualism was more about rhetoric and political theater than a wholesale rejection of expertise.

Richard Nixon has expressed skepticism toward intellectuals, and Ivy League‑educated elites, calling them arrogant and "above the law". He reportedly told aides that professors were "the enemy."

Ronald Reagan repeatedly criticized professors, journalists, and intellectual elites, portraying them as biased against faith, patriotism, and ordinary Americans. As governor of California and later during his presidency, he linked rising tuition, student unrest, and campus speech with a broader culture of liberal elitism.

George W. Bush is often described as using anti‑intellectualism strategically by framing complex policy issues in stark moral terms, Bush's post‑9/11 rhetoric framed the war on terror as a simple moral struggle between good and evil, with no need for nuanced analysis of Middle Eastern politics or intelligence uncertainties. This narrative treated dissenting or cautionary experts as unpatriotic or overly cautious.

=== Donald Trump ===
Donald Trump has been accused of using anti-intellectual rhetoric throughout his presidency, because he repeatedly distrusts, dismisses, or attacks experts, institutions of higher learning, and scientific consensus, while elevating personal intuition, loyalty, and common sense over evidence‑based reasoning. Critics argue this pattern fits a broader anti‑intellectual stance that treats expertise as elitist or corrupt rather than as a source of public knowledge.

The phrase "alternative facts" was coined by Kellyanne Conway, the Counselor to the President, when she defended a false statement by Sean Spicer regarding the attendance numbers at the first inauguration of Donald Trump by denying objective facts.

In 2017, a Pew Research Center poll revealed that a majority of American Republicans thought colleges and universities had a negative impact on the United States. During the first Trump administration, fake news and alternative facts were stated by some to have become central pillars of discourse in the United States.

== Progressive and left-wing anti-intellectualism ==
Critics on the right and some centrist commentators have framed aspects of progressive politics such as body positivity, the denial of reverse racism and reverse sexism, and terms such "birthing people", as examples of progressive anti-intellectualism.

=== Body positivity and fat acceptance ===
Critics argue insisting that all bodies must be celebrated as equally attractive and healthy - while treating any expression of concern about health, aesthetics, or risk as body shaming, it can shut down empirical discussion about obesity‑related health risks or trade‑offs between self‑acceptance and prevention.

=== Denial and or rejection of 'Reverse sexism' ===
Critics argue denial or strong skepticism toward reverse sexism has been used, in certain contexts, has to downplay or marginalize male victims of abuse by women – which has contributed to the rise of masculinism and more misogynistic movements such as Men Going Their Own Way (MGTOW).

=== DEI ===
Critics of some DEI initiatives argue that emphasizing demographic representation in institutional decisions may reduce the role of traditional merit-based criteria, such as individual achievement and qualifications. These critics contend that such approaches can affect standards of excellence and intellectual diversity.

=== Latinx ===
Latinx is a gender alternative to 'Latino' and 'Latina' by replacing the masculine ⟨-o⟩ and feminine ⟨-a⟩ ending with the ⟨-x⟩ suffix. Critics argue the term prioritizes ideological goals over linguistic evidence, empirical research, or how Spanish is actually used by speakers.

== Other ==
Talking to Americans was a regular feature presented by Rick Mercer on the Canadian political satire show This Hour Has 22 Minutes, which was later spun off into a one-hour special that aired on April 1, 2001, on CBC Television.
