= Toolbox =

Box used to organise, carry and protect tools

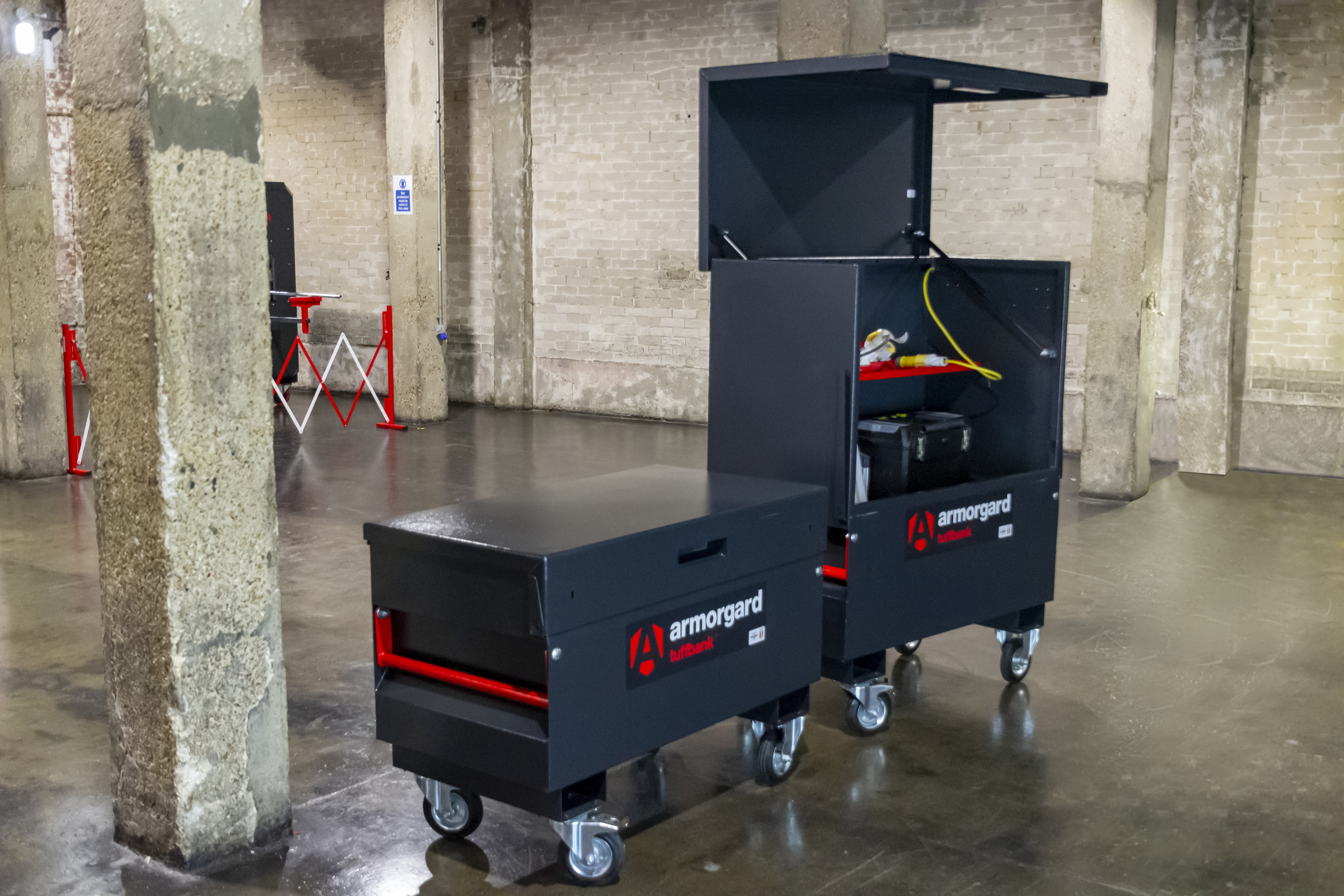
Standard site toolbox as used in mechanical workshops like automobile repair shops

A toolbox (also called toolkit, tool chest or workbox) is a box to organize, carry, and protect the owner's tools. They could be used for trade, a hobby or DIY, and their contents vary with the craft.

== Types ==
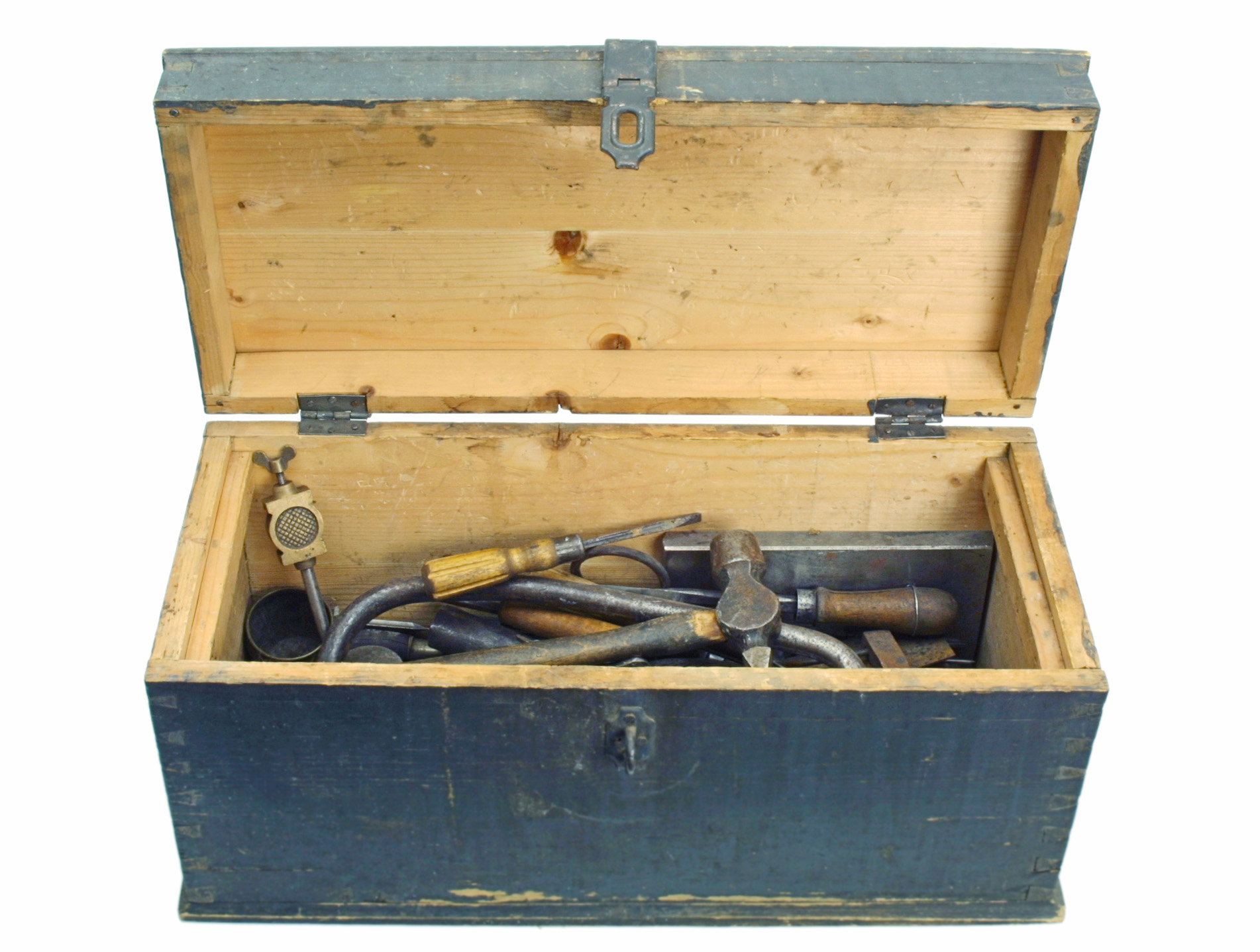
Simple wooden toolbox

A toolbox could refer to several types of storage to hold tools. It could mean a small portable box that can carry a few tools to a project location or a large storage system set on casters. Modern toolboxes are predominantly made of metal or plastic, although some luxury models may be made of hardwoods. Wood was the material of choice for toolboxes built beginning in the early 19th century.

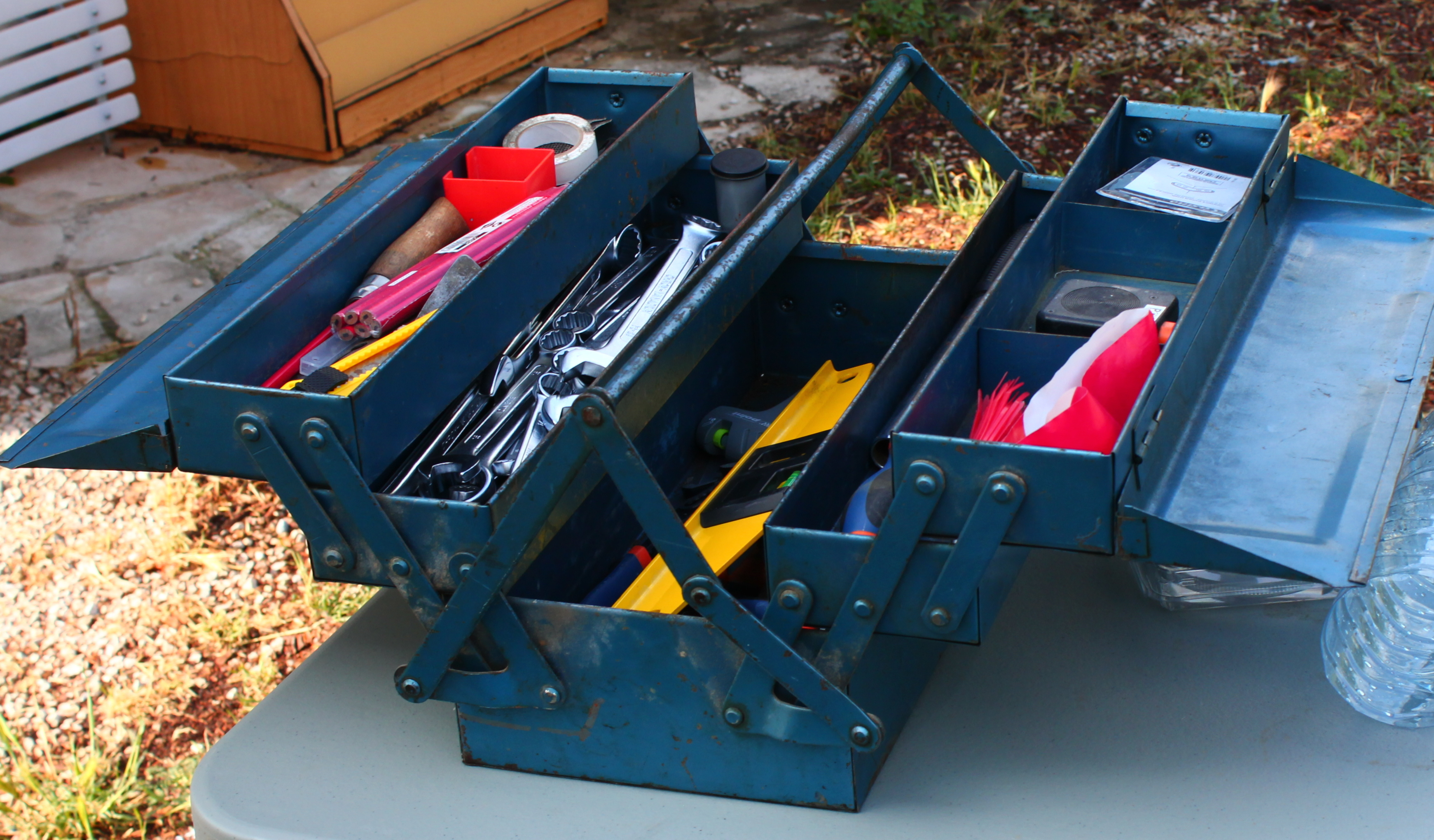
Cantilever toolbox with carrying handle, popular with mobile service personnel of various professions, in an opened state. For transport, the different compartments are folded together (symmetrically towards the middle from both sides) resulting in a closed compact box with the footprint of the lowermost section.

Small portable toolboxes are sometimes called hand boxes or portable tool storage. Most portable toolboxes have one handle on top and a lid that opens on a hinge. Many have a removable tote tray to help organize smaller parts and accessories, which sits on a flange inside the lip of the box, with a single larger compartment below. Portable toolboxes sometimes use slide-out trays or cantilever trays in lieu of the removable tote tray.

Metal toolboxes (typically steel) weigh more than plastic ones. A plastic toolbox laden with tools can weigh the same as a comparable steel box does when empty. Metal boxes are also subject to rusting, and their sharp edges can mar the surfaces of things they are banged against. Metal can be stronger than plastic, so users balance its disadvantages against the need to withstand abuse, and to support the weight of many tools.

Waterproof toolboxes are made of corrosion-resistant metal or plastic, and are equipped with gasket seals and some sort of clamping and latching mechanism, to protect their contents.

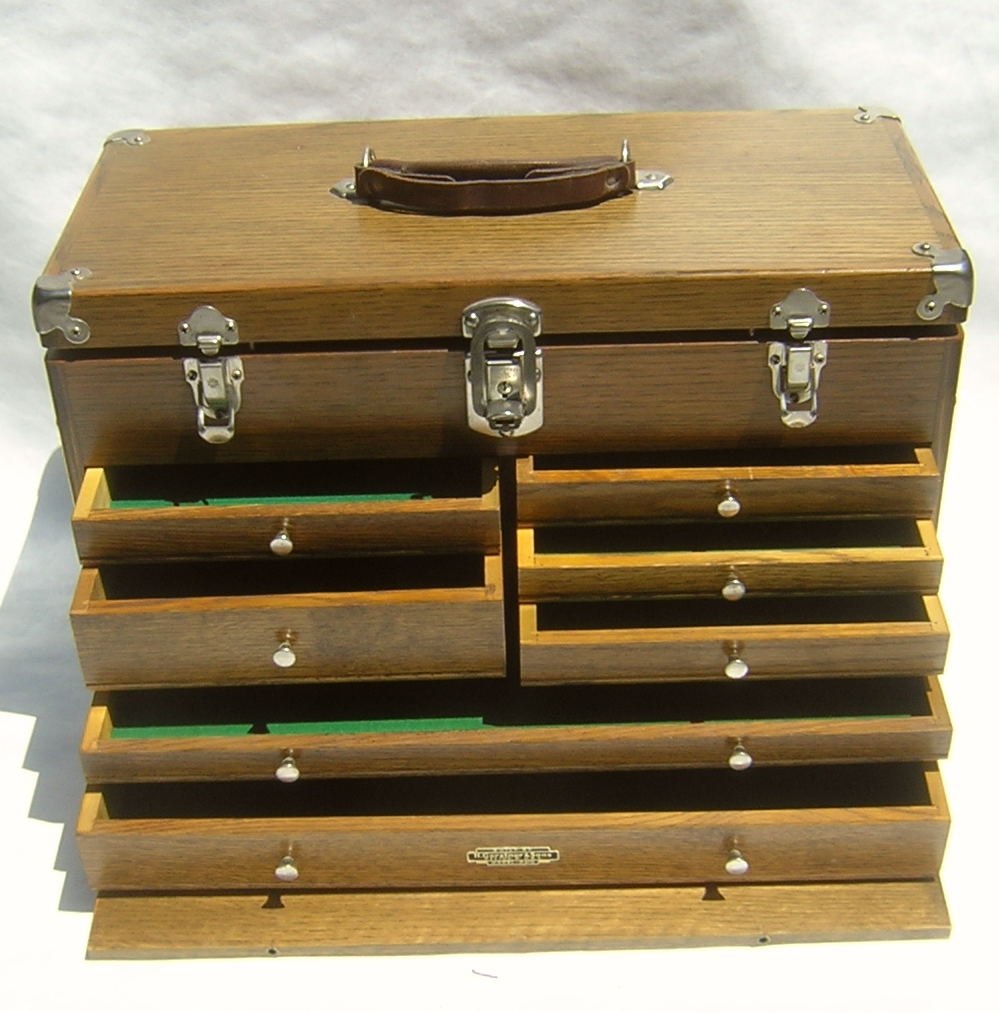
Portable chest with a carrying handle

Portable chests are a type of tool storage that is small enough to carry, but has drawers to organize contents. Portable chests have a handle on top for portability and a top lid that opens on hinges. Portable chests typically have 3-4 drawers. Most are made from metal, but some have a plastic shell with metal drawers in order to help lighten the piece.

A toolbox can also refer to a large tool storage system, or tool chest combos, that includes multiple pieces. These systems are almost always made from metal. Most tool storage systems are painted steel, but some are stainless steel and aluminum. They include a top chest that has drawers and a top lid that opens on a hinge. The top chest is designed to sit on a cabinet, also called a rolling cabinet (rollcab) or rollaway. The cabinet sits on four or more casters and has drawers to organize tools. Other pieces can be added to the system or combo. A middle chest, also called an intermediate chest, can be placed between the top chest and cabinet for extra storage. A side cabinet with more drawers can be hung from the side of a cabinet. A side locker can also be hung from the side of a cabinet; usually with a door that protects shelves or small drawers.

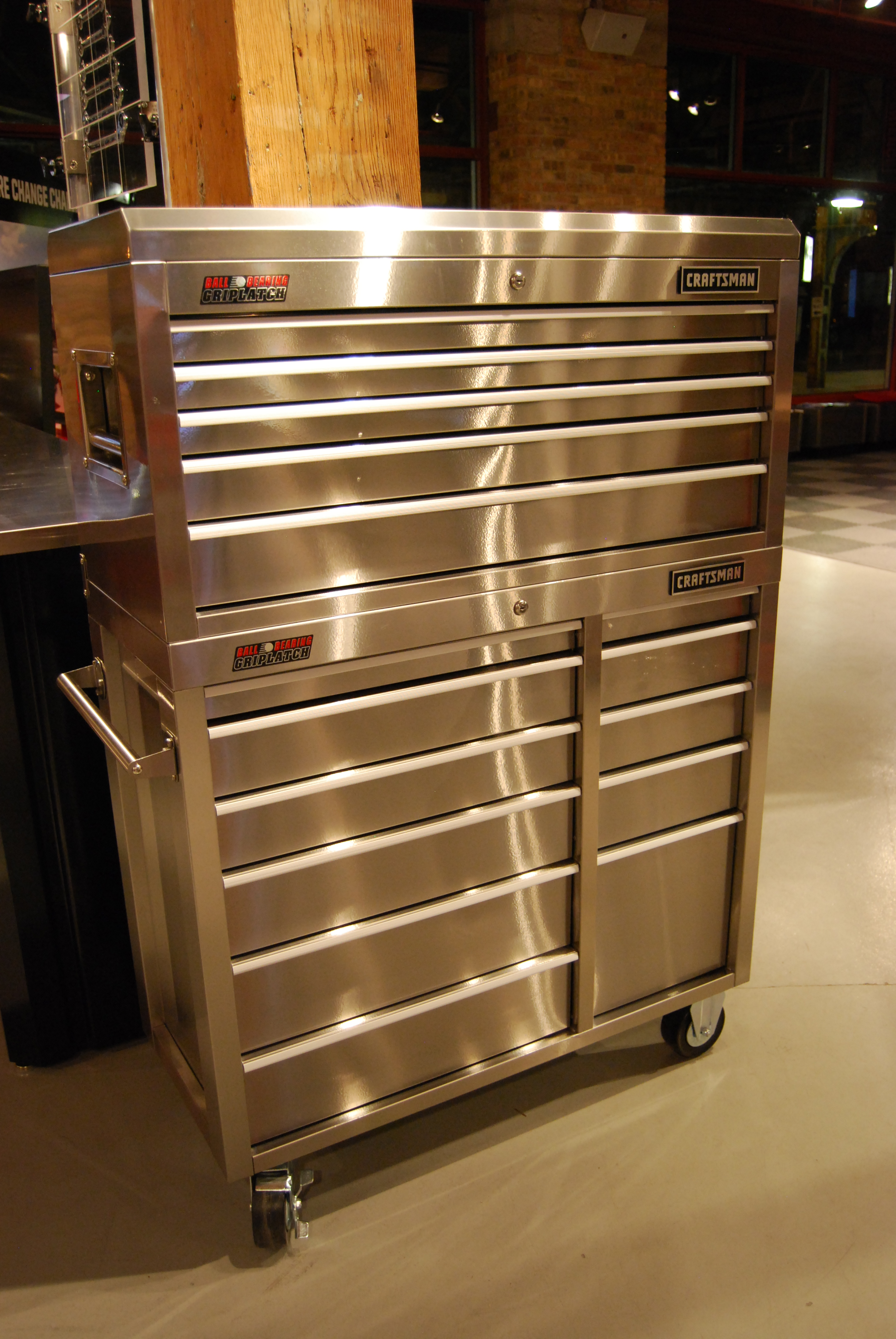
Tool chest with wheels

Toolcarts (also known as rollcabs) are commonly used in the transportation industry for maintenance and repair of vehicles on location. Used as portable work stations, some of the larger types are self powered and propelled, for example, pit carts in automobile racing.

After several decades of decline in popularity, today a resurgence in use is underway. Viewed by many as intended primarily for specialized craftsmanship, such as machinists, tool and die makers, jewelers and other specialized craftsmen, they are also sought after by average tradesman and collectors as working heirloom. Many toolboxes and chests from a variety of trades can be seen at the Smithsonian Museum of American History.

== Alternatives to toolboxes ==
Ther are many alternatives to traditional toolboxes:

- Toolset: These are molded plastic cases typically containing a variety of household or automotive tools. Each item snaps into a designated spot in the case, which makes organizing tools much easier than with a conventional toolbox. They are often very compact, lightweight, and inexpensive relative to purchasing tools and a toolbox separately. There are two major disadvantages: no ability to customize the selection of tools (sometimes the tools are of lower quality than what one might purchase individually); and little or no space to add new tools and supplies. Thus one still might need a toolbox in addition to the toolset.
- Toolbelt and apron: Though at the far extreme of portability, they are insufficient for storing a large number of tools. One might use a toolbox for permanent storage and a toolbelt or apron to take just what is needed for a job. They are used in locations where a worker needs access to more tools than he can carry with just his hands while working in a location with no place to set tools down, such as working on a ladder or hanging from a utility pole.
- Tool attaché case or briefcase: This tool carrier is used to carry tools and specialized equipment when working in offices and similar locations. The case often is furnished with foldout or removable flat pallets lined with multiple small pockets to help organize the tools.
- Backpack toolcase: This tool carrier can resemble an ordinary backpack, but often is fitted with foldout or removable tool pallets or other ways of organizing the contents.
- Tool chest: A large single, or stacked metal cabinet with multiple doors that can accommodate large amounts of assorted light and heavy tools, as well as other repair equipment.
- Toolbag: Tool bags are often made of heavy canvas and leather. Some tool bags have a hinged steel frame around the opening. This allows the bag to stay open when in use. Many tool bags have pockets on the inside and or outside. They usually include handles and sometimes shoulder straps. Tool bags often have a firm, reinforced bottom panel. Tool bags may have a zipper or leather strap closure. Tool bags closely resemble medical bags.
- Bucket organizer: This consists of rugged fabric or polyester bags draped into and around a sturdy 5-gallon plastic bucket. They are lightweight, inexpensive, and can rival the toolbox as a means of storing and moving tools to a job site. Their dozens of pockets permit better organization, yet nearly everything is visible at first glance. That, however, could be a disadvantage as well, since one may have privacy or security concerns if the bucket has to be left in a public area. By contrast, toolboxes are often lockable and conceal their contents. In a moving vehicle, the bucket may be jostled and spill some of its contents. Tools left outdoors are also better protected from the elements in a toolbox.
- Autocart: These are utility carts having a pivoting base for storage in vehicles. They are used by tradespersons to carry tools, equipment or supplies. They combine the advantages of toolboxes and toolbelts and are essentially portable truckboxes or transportable shopping carts.
- Workshop trolley: This is a tool cabinet with wheels, and, because of that, the tools can be easily moved from one location to another. These mobile cabinets are often found in workplaces of mechanics, who may own and take responsibility for their own sets of tools.

== Gallery ==
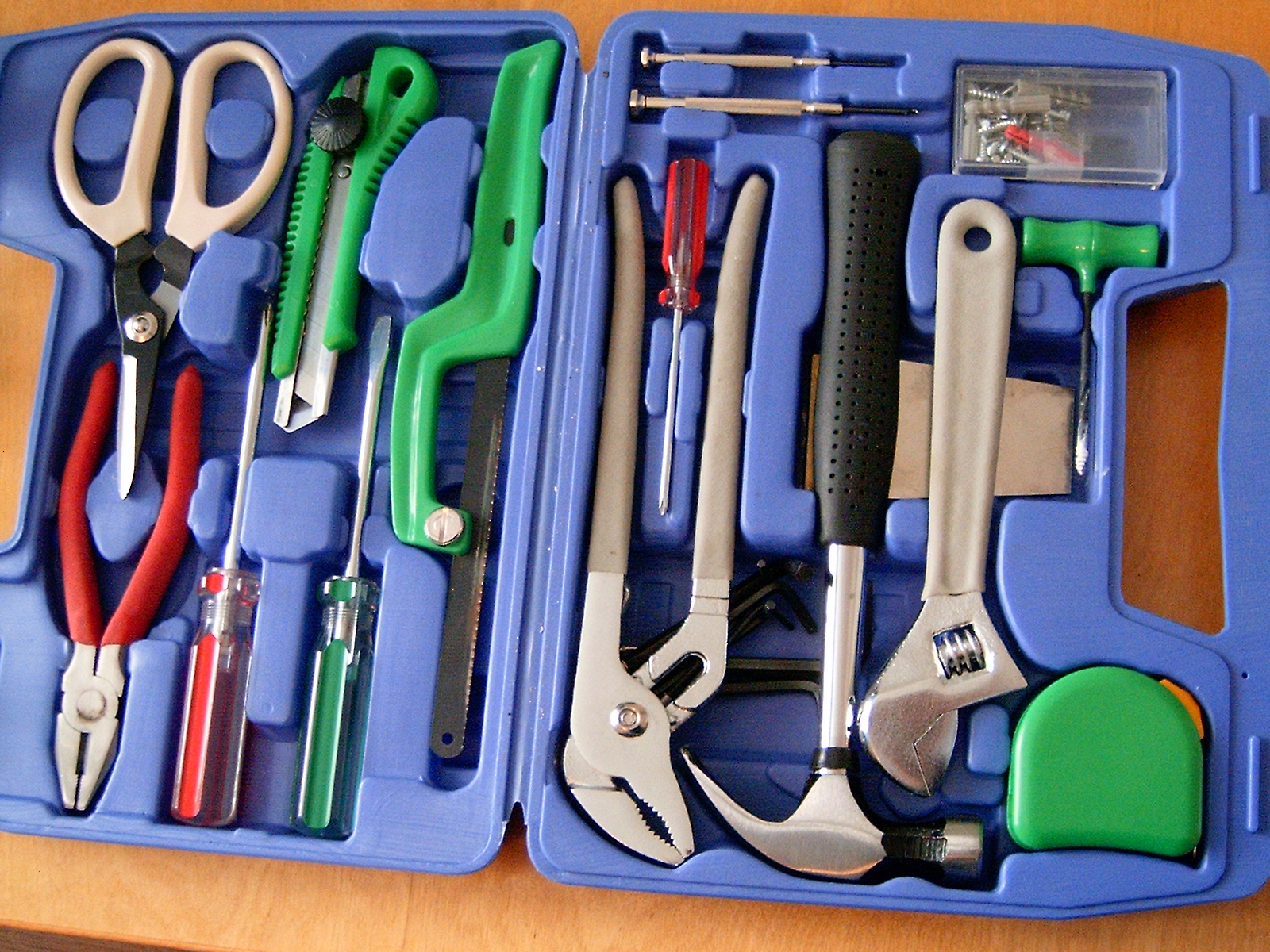
A toolset in a plastic cover

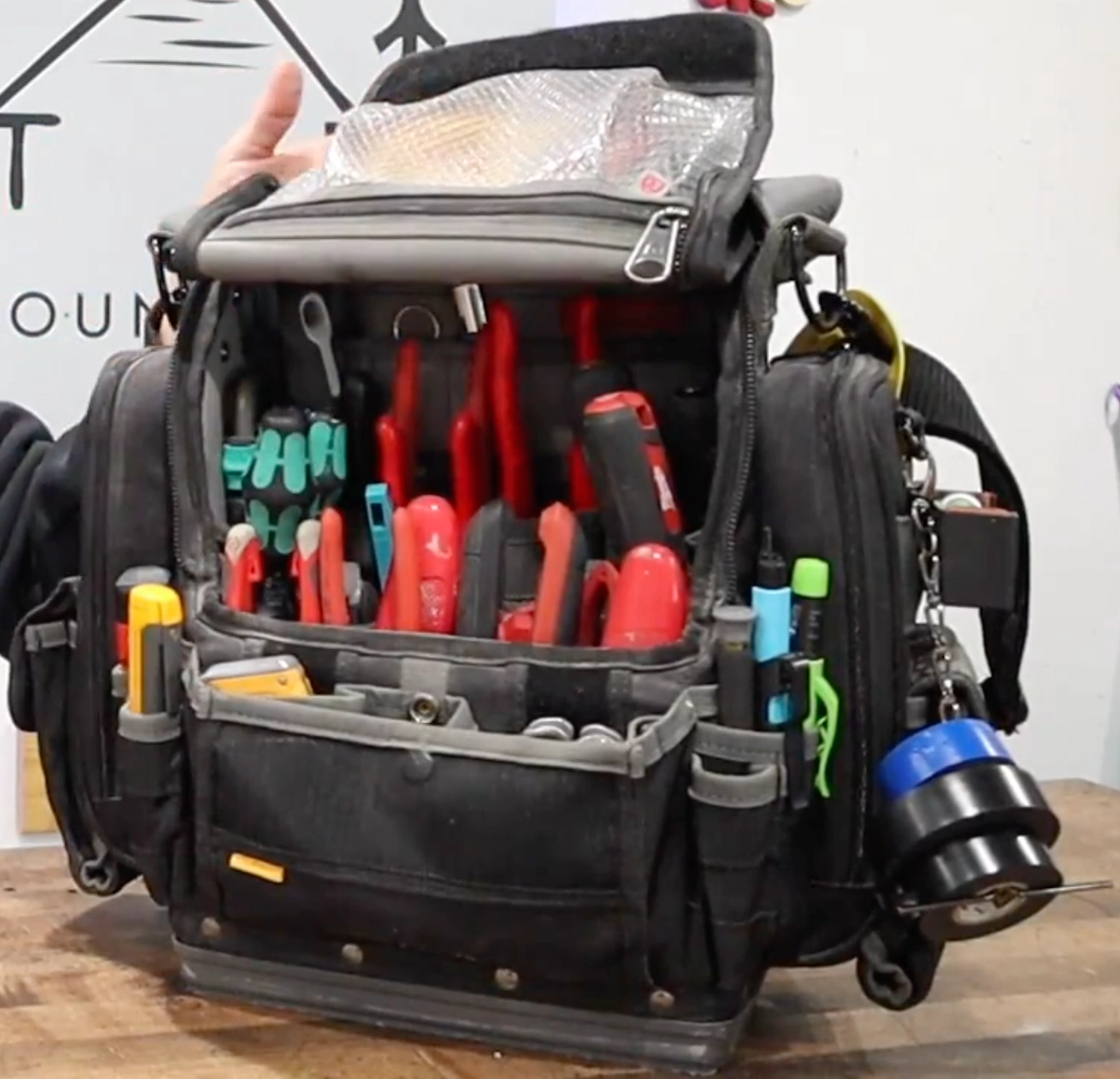
Tool bag

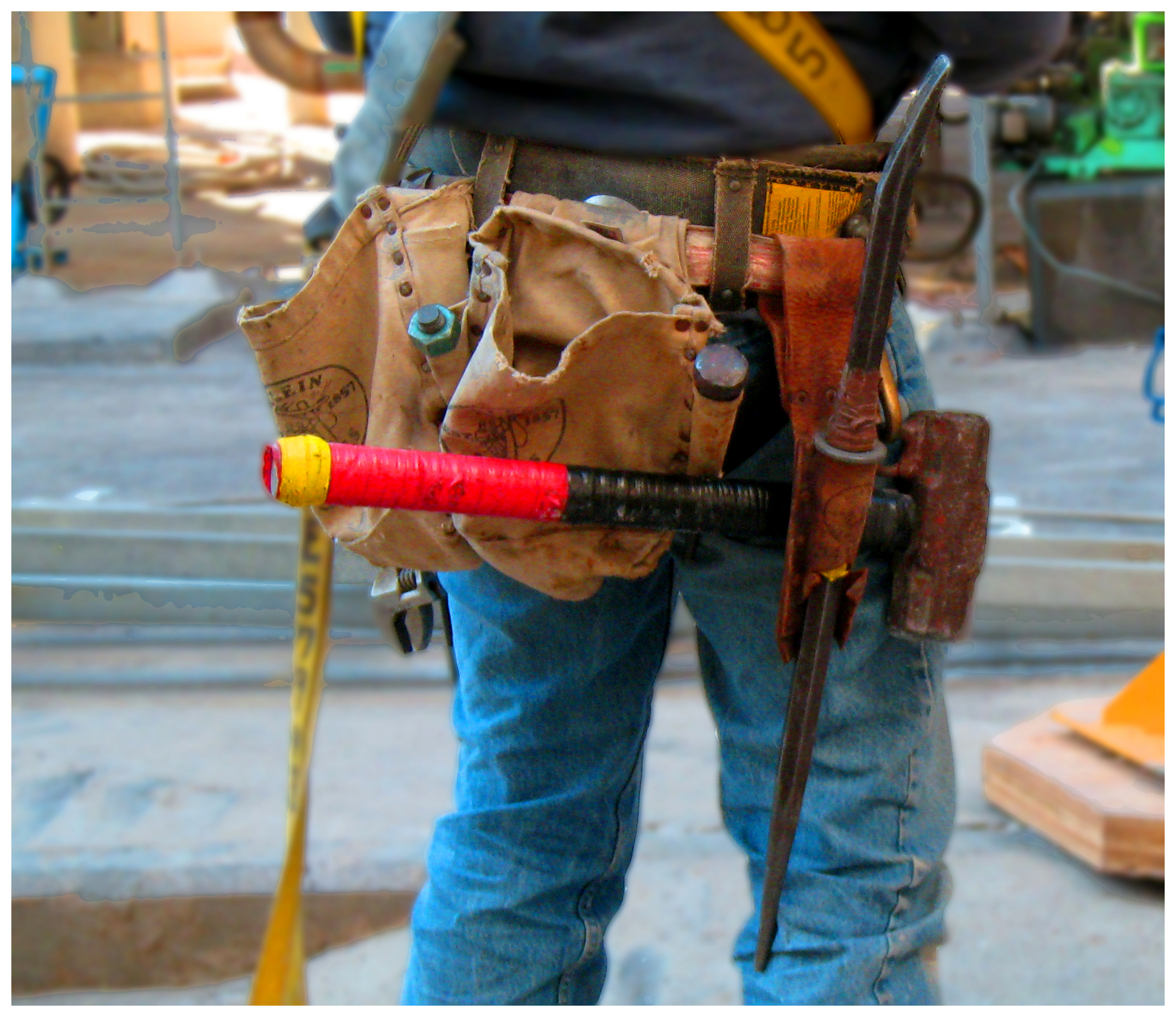
Iron worker's tool belt

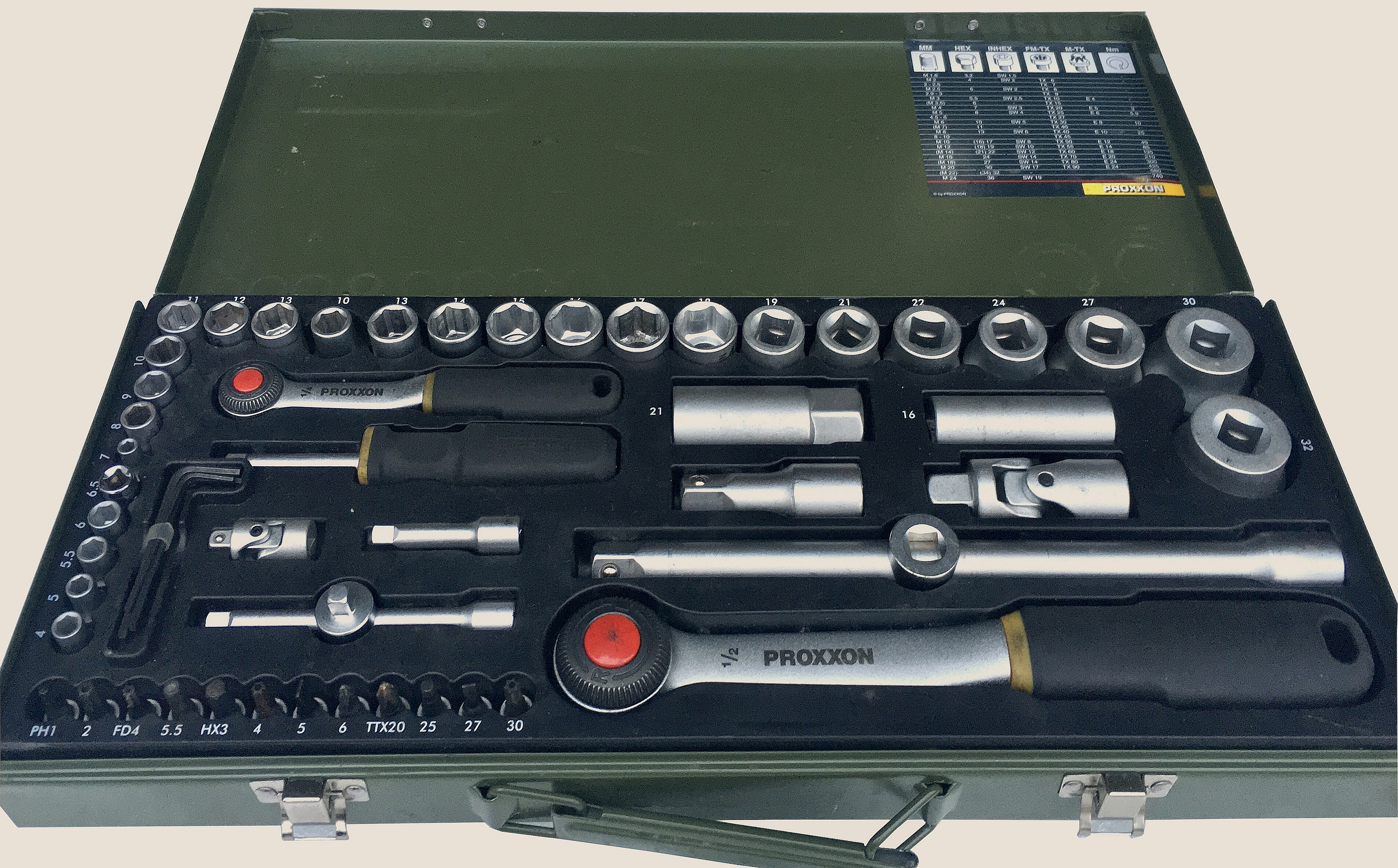
A professional socket toolset in a metal box, containing ratcheting socket wrenches in two sizes, sockets, bits and accessories. Such toolsets are standard equipment in mechanical workshops of various types. The image contains annotated descriptions for each item, visible when enlarged.

== In computing ==
The figurative term toolbox is used in computing to represent a set of subroutines (or functions) and global variables. Typically these implement missing functionality using capabilities available in the core software.

== See also ==
- Gang box
- Repair kit
- Organizer box
- Tool belt
