= 14,000 Things to Be Happy About =

1990 book by Barbara Ann Kipfer

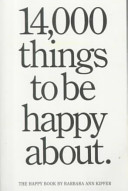
- Author: Barbara Ann Kipfer
- Language: English
- Publisher: Workman Publishing
- Publication date: 1990
- Publication place: United States
- Pages: 612
- ISBN: 978-0-89480-370-3
- Dewey Decimal: 031.02 20
- LC Class: B187.H3 K55 1990

14,000 Things to Be Happy About is a book by Barbara Ann Kipfer. Illustrated by Pierre Le-Tan. It was published in 1990 by Workman Publishing. The book is a list of about 14,000 random and sometimes abstract items, apparently compiled by the author over the course of 20 years. More than one million copies have been sold. It was ranked 11th on the 1990 paperback bestseller list. The 25th anniversary edition was published in 2014.
