= Madeleine Mathiot =

American linguist (1927–2020)

- Born: June 11, 1927
- Died: December 4, 2020 (aged 93)
- Children: 1

Academic background
- Education: Catholic University of America
- Thesis: An approach to the study of language and culture relations (1968)

Madeleine Mathiot (June 11, 1927 – December 4, 2020) was an American linguist who was professor emerita of linguistics at the University at Buffalo in Buffalo, New York.

Mathiot received her PhD in 1966 from the Catholic University of America with a dissertation entitled, "An approach to the study of language and culture relations." She is best known for her work on the O'odham language (also known as Papago-Pima), linguistic meaning, and conversation analysis. In 1973 she published A Dictionary of Papago Usage which was based on her work with O'odham-language speakers in the late 1950s and early 1960s. The Arizona Daily Star lauded it as "probably the finest dictionary compiled for any North American Indian language."

== Publications ==
- Mathiot, M. (n.d.). Talk in interactive events: The view from within. Unpublished manuscript, Department of Linguistics, University at Buffalo, Buffalo, NY.
- Mathiot, M. (2014). Jim and Bonnie's telephone conversation revisited: A meaning-based approach to talk in interactive events. Semiotica, 199, 247–267.
- Mathiot, M. (2013). Individual variation in participants' account of their own interaction. Semiotica, 193, 337–359.
- Mathiot, M. (1991). The reminiscenses of Juan Dolores, an early 'O'odham linguist. Anthropological Linguistics, 33(3), 233–316.
- Mathiot, M. (1990). On generalizing in the case study approach. La Linguistique, 26(2), 129–151.
- Mathiot, M. (1987). The rhythmical patterning of talk in everyday conversation. Proceedings of LAUD Symposium. Article 195.
- Mathiot, M., Boyerlein, P., Fletcher, R., Levy, J.-A., & Marks, P.(1986). Meaning attribution to behavior in face to face interaction – a hermeneutic-phenomenological approach. Research on Language and Social Interaction, 20(1–4), 271–375.
- Mathiot, M. (1985). Semantics of sensory perception terms. In H. Seiler & G. Brettschneider (eds.), Language invariants and mental operations (pp. 135–161). Tübingen: Günter Narr.
- Mathiot, M. (1981). The self-disclosure technique for ethnographic elicitation. In M. Herzfeld & M. Lenhart (eds.), Semiotics (pp. 339–346). New York, NY: Plenum Press.
- Mathiot, M. (1979a). Folk definitions as a tool for the analysis of lexical meaning. In M. Mathiot (ed.), Ethnolinguistics: Boas, Sapir, and Whorf revisited (pp. 121–260). The Hague: Mouton de Gruyter.
- Mathiot, M. (1979b). Sex roles as revealed through referential gender in American English. In M. Mathiot (ed.), Ethnolinguistics: Boas, Sapir, and Whorf revisited (pp. 4–49). The Hague: Mouton de Gruyter.
- Mathiot, M. (1973). A dictionary of Papago usage. 2 volumes. Bloomington, IN: Indiana University Press.
- Mathiot, M. (1969). The cognitive significance of the category of nominal number in Papago. In D. Hymes & W. E. Bittle (ed.), Studies in Southwestern ethnolinguistics (pp. 197–237). The Hague: Mouton.
- Mathiot, M. (1962). Noun classes and folk taxonomy in Papago. American Anthropologist, 64(2), 340–350.
