= Harold Wentworth (lexicographer) =

American lexicographer

Harold Wentworth (1904-1965) was an American lexicographer and specialist in English usage and slang in the United States. Born in Cortland, New York, he studied at Cornell University ('27 BS, '29 AM, '34 PhD) and taught at Cornell University and the University of West Virginia.

Wentworth's American Dialect Dictionary (1944) and Dictionary of American Slang (1960) are important early works on non-normative language in the American dialect.
