= List of lexicographers =

This list contains people who contributed to the field of lexicography, the theory and practice of compiling dictionaries.

== A ==
- Maulvi Abdul Haq (India/Pakistan, 1872–1961) Baba-e-Urdu, English-Urdu dictionary
- Ivar Aasen (Norway, 1813–1896) Norwegian language
- Abu Amr Ishaq ibn Mirar al-Shaybani (Iraq, c. 738–828) Arabic
- Ilia Abuladze (Georgia, 1901–1968) Old Georgian
- Johann Christoph Adelung (Germany, 1732–1806) German language general dictionary
- George J. Adler (Germany/US, 1821–1868) German/English
- Robert Ainsworth (UK, 1660–1743) Latin
- Adam Jack Aitken (UK, 1921–1998) Scots language
- John Michael Allaby (UK, born 1933) English LSP
- Anthony Allen (UK, late 17th century – 1754) obsolete English words
- Robert Allen (UK, born 1944) English language general
- Amerias (Greece, 3rd century BC) Ancient Macedonian
- Ethan Allen Andrews (US, 1787–1858) Latin
- Vladimir Anić (Croatia, 1930–2000) Croatian general
- Vaman Shivram Apte (India, 1858–1892) English-Sanskrit
- Ġużè Aquilina (Malta, 1911–1997) Maltese language
- Aristophanes of Byzantium (Greece, 257–180 BC) Ancient Greek
- Sue Atkins (UK, 1931–2021) English/French bilingual
- Ali Azaykou (Morocco, 1942–2004) Berber languages

== B ==
- Albert Bachmann (Switzerland, 1863–1934) Swiss German
- Francis Bacon (UK, 1561–1626) philosophy and science
- Nathan Bailey (UK, 1691–1742) English
- Johannes Balbus (Italy, died 1298) Latin
- Frederick W. Baller (UK, 1852–1922) Chinese
- Katherine Barber (Canada, 1959–2021) English
- Edmund Henry Barker (UK, 1788–1839) Classical languages
- Clarence Barnhart (US, 1900–1993) English general dictionary
- David Barnhart (US, born 1941) English
- Robert Barnhart (US, 1933–2007) English
- Louis Barral (France, 1910–1999) French and Monégasque
- Grant Barrett (US, born 1970) English dictionary of slang
- John Barrow (UK, fl. 1735–1774) navigation and science
- Marcos E. Becerra (Mexico, 1870–1940) Spanish language
- Richard Beckett (Australia, 1936–1987) English food guides
- William Bedwell (UK, 1561–1632) Arabic
- Ivan Belostenec (Croatia, 1594–1675) Illyrian and Latin
- Henning Bergenholtz (Denmark, born 1944) Danish LSP dictionary
- Eric Blom (Switzerland, 1888–1959) music dictionary
- Thomas Blount (UK, 1618–1679) English
- Robert Blust (US, 1940–2022) Austronesian languages
- Jean-Baptiste Boissiere (France, 1806–1885) French thesaurus
- Peter Bowler (Australia, living) English
- Abel Boyer (France, c. 1667–1729) French and English
- Dan Beach Bradley (US, 1845–1923) Siamese
- Henry Bradley (UK, 1845–1923) English general
- Jim Breen (Australia, born 1947) Japanese and English
- Ebenezer Cobham Brewer (UK, 1810–1897) English
- Francis Brinkley (Ireland/UK/Japan, 1841–1912) Japanese and English
- Nathan Brown (US/Burma/Japan, 1807–1886) Assamese and Japanese
- Aleksander Brückner (Poland, 1856–1939) Polish and German
- Kazimieras Būga (Lithuania, 1879–1924) Lithuanian
- John Bullokar (UK, 1574–1627) English language dictionary of hard words
- Robert Burchfield (New Zealand/UK 1923–2004) English language historical
- Arthur Coke Burnell (England and India, 1840–1882), co-compiler of Hobson-Jobson Anglo-Indian

== C ==
- Ambrogio Calepino (Italy, c. 1450–1510) Latin
- Angus Cameron (Canada, 1941–1983) English
- Joachim Heinrich Campe (Germany, 1746–1818) German
- Emanuel Nunes Carvalho (UK/US, 1771–1817) Hebrew
- Edmund Castell (UK, 1606–1685) Oriental languages
- Robert Cawdrey (UK, c. 1538–1604) English
- Pranas Čepėnas (Lithuania/US, 1899–1980) Lithuanian
- Mohamed Chafik (Morocco, born 1926) Berber
- Robert L. Chapman (US, 1920–2002) English
- Nikoloz Cholokashvili (Georgia, 1585–1658) Georgian
- David Chubinashvili (Georgia/Russia, 1814–1891) Georgian
- Michael Chyet (US, born 1957) Kurdish
- Saïd Cid Kaoui (Algeria, 1859–1910) Berber
- Cigerxwîn (Turkey/Syria, 1903–1984) Kurdish language
- Henry Cockeram (UK, 17th century) English and Latin
- Herbert Coleridge (UK, 1830–1861) English language historical
- Elisha Coles (UK, c. 1608–1688) English
- Thomas Cooper (UK, c. 1517–1594) English and Latin
- Randle Cotgrave (UK, died 1634) English and French
- John Craig (UK, 1796–1880), English
- William Craigie (UK/US, 1867–1957) English language historical dictionary
- Jane Tapsubei Creider (Kenya, fl. 1989–2001) Nandi language
- Samuel Ajayi Crowther (Nigeria, 1809–1891) Yoruba

== D ==
- Vladimir Dahl (Russia, 1801–1872) Explanatory Dictionary of the Live Great Russian language
- Charles Anderson Dana (US, 1819–1897) English language encyclopedic dictionary
- Frederick William Danker (US, 1920–2012) New Testament Greek lexicon
- Đào Duy Anh (Vietnam, 1904–1988) Scholarly Vietnamese, Pháp-Việt Từ điển
- Khudiram Das (India, 1916–2002) Bengali-Santali
- John Davies (Wales, 1567–1644) Welsh and Latin
- Tomás de Bhaldraithe (Ireland, 1916–1996) Irish and English
- William Quinby De Funiak (US, 1901–1981) American and British
- Ali-Akbar Dehkhoda (Iran, 1879–1956) extensive dictionary in Persian
- Philip Delaporte (Germany/US, 1868–1928) German and Nauruan
- Francesco della Penna (Italy, 1680–1745) Tibetan and Italian bilingual
- Susie Dent (UK, born 1964) English
- Friedrich Christian Diez (Germany, 1794–1876) etymological dictionary of Romance languages
- Patrick S. Dinneen (Ireland, 1860–1934) Irish and English bilingual
- Josef Dobrovský (Czechoslovakia, 1753–1829) Slavic languages, Czech and German bilingual
- Jacob Ludwig Döhne (Germany/South Africa, 1811–1879) Zulu and English bilingual
- Franz Dornseiff (Germany, 1888–1960) German language thesaurus
- Henry Drisler (US, 1818–1939) Latin dictionary
- Konrad Duden (Germany, 1829–1911) German language general
- Edward Dwelly (UK, 1864–1939) Scottish Gaelic
- Thomas Dyche (UK, late 17th century – 1733) English language spelling

== E ==
- Eugene Ehrlich (US, 1922–2008) English language general and specialised
- Ernst Johann Eitel (Germany/China, 1838–1908) Cantonese Chinese dictionary
- John Eliot (UK/US, 1604–1690) Native American
- Karim Emami (Iran, 1930–2005) Persian and English
- Leo James English (Australia/Philippines, 1907–1997) Tagalog and English bilingual
- Adolf Erman (Germany, 1854–1937) Ancient Egyptian
- Robert Estienne (France, 1503–1559) Latin thesaurus
- Daniel Silvan Evans (Wales, 1818–1903) Welsh and English bilingual
- Avraham Even-Shoshan (Belarus/Israel, 1906–1984) Hebrew language general

== F ==
- Fairuzabadi (Iran, 1329–1414) Arabic language comprehensive
- Al-Khalil ibn Ahmad al-Farahidi (Basra, 718–791) Arabic language general
- Fortunato Felice (Italy, 1723–1789) Italian and French encyclopedic
- Christiane Fellbaum (Germany/US, living) German and English cognitive linguistics
- Jean-François Féraud (France, 1725–1807) French critical dictionary
- Charles J. Fillmore (US, 1929–2014) English and Japanese cognitive linguistics
- Stuart Berg Flexner (US, 1928–1990) English dictionary of slang
- John Florio (England, 1553–1625) comprehensive Italian to English
- Henrik Florinus (Finland, 1633–1705) Latin, Swedish and Finnish trilingual
- Johann Gottfried Flügel (Germany/US, 1788–1855) German and English bilingual
- Henry Watson Fowler (UK, 1858–1933) English general
- Sami Frashëri (also Şemseddin Sâmi) (Ottoman Empire, 1850–1904) Ottoman Turkish, Arabic, French
- James O. Fraser (UK/China, 1886–1938) Lisu language
- Wilhelm Freund (Germany, 1806–1894) Latin general
- Jens Andreas Friis (Norway, 1821–1896) Sami language general
- Johan Fritzner (Norway, 1812–1893) Old Norse
- Louis Frolla (Monaco, 1904–1978) French and Monégasque
- Isaac Kaufmann Funk (US, 1839–1912) English general
- Antoine Furetière (France, 1619–1688) French universal
- Frederick James Furnivall (UK, 1825–1910) English historical

== G ==
- Brent Galloway (US, 1944–2014) Native American languages
- Cristfried Ganander (Finland, 1741–1790) Finnish general
- Marie de Garis (UK, 1910–2010) Guernésiais language general dictionary
- Johannes de Garlandia (UK/France, c. 1190–1270) Latin
- Bryan A. Garner (US, born 1958) English general and LSP
- Dirk Geeraerts (Belgium, born 1955) cognitive linguistics
- Nayden Gerov (Bulgaria, 1823–1900) Bulgarian general
- Peter Gilliver (UK, born 1964) English historical
- Rudolph Goclenius (Germany, 1547–1628) Latin LSP
- Jacob Golius (Netherlands, 1596–1667) Arabic and Persian to Latin
- Chauncey Allen Goodrich (US, 1790–1860) English general
- Philip Babcock Gove (US, 1902–1972) English general
- Louis Herbert Gray (US, 1875–1955) Indo-Iranian languages
- Jonathon Green (UK, born 1948) English slang
- Jacob Ludwig Carl Grimm (Germany, 1785–1863) German historical
- Francis Hindes Groome (UK, 1851–1902) Gypsy
- Francis Grose (UK, c. 1730–1791) English historical
- Hermann Gundert (Germany/India, 1814–1893) Malayalam and English bilingual
- Rosario María Gutiérrez Eskildsen (Mexico, 1899–1979) Spanish language
- Karl Gützlaff (Germany/Thailand/China, 1803–1851) Cambodian and Chinese
- Bartol Gyurgieuvits (Croatia, 1506–1566) Croatian and Latin bilingual

== H ==
- Mary Rosamund Haas (US, 1910–1996) Native American and Thai
- Soleiman Haim (Iran, 1897–1970) Persian and English bilingual
- Patrick Hanks (UK, 1940–2024) English language general, onomastic, and LSP
- Johann Ernst Hanxleden (Germany/India, 1681–1732) Malayalam, Sanskrit and Portuguese dictionary
- Orin Hargraves (US, born 1953) English dictionary of slang and rhyme
- Alexander Harkavy (Belarus/US, 1863–1939) Yiddish and English bilingual
- William Torrey Harris (US, 1835–1909) philosophy, English general
- Reinhard Hartmann (Austria/UK, 1938–2024) Austrian and English contrastive linguistics, LSP dictionary
- Einar Ingvald Haugen (Norway/US, 1906–1994) Old Norse, Norwegian and English
- Joyce Hawkins (England, 1928–1992) English language general
- S.I. Hayakawa (Canada/US, 1906–1992), biographical directory of US Congress
- Benjamin Hedericus (Germany, 1675–1748) Latin and Greek
- Tom Heehler (US, born 1963) The Well-Spoken Thesaurus
- Michael Heilprin (Poland/US, 1823–1888) Hebrew and English encyclopedic
- James Curtis Hepburn (US/China/Japan, 1815–1911) Japanese and English bilingual
- Charles George Herbermann (Germany/US, 1840–1916) English language LSP
- Hesychius of Alexandria (Greece, 5th century) Ancient Greek language lexicon
- Johann Christian August Heyse (Germany, 1764–1829) German dictionary of loan words
- Jack Hibberd (Australia, born 1940) English dictionary of slang
- Hoke Sein (Myanmar, 1890–1984) Universal Burmese-English-Pali
- Aurélio Buarque de Holanda Ferreira (Brazil, 1910–1989) Portuguese-language general
- William Holwell (1726–1798), English classicist and cleric
- Francis Holyoake (UK, 1567–1653) English etymological
- A. S. Hornby (UK/Japan, 1898–1978) English learners'
- John Camden Hotten (UK, 1832–1873) English slang, A Dictionary of Modern Slang, Cant, and Vulgar Words
- Antônio Houaiss (Brazil, 1915–1999) Portuguese general
- Richard Howard (US, born 1929) French and English translation
- August Wilhelm Hupel (Germany/Estonia, 1737–1819) Estonian general
- Robert Hunter (Encyclopædist) (England, 1823–1897), lead editor of Encyclopædic Dictionary

== I ==
- Jonah ibn Janah (Spain, c. 990–1050) Hebrew lexicon
- Ibn Manzur (Maghreb Arabia, 1233–1312) Arabic dictionary incorporating earlier
- Laurynas Ivinskis (Lithuania, 1810–1881) Lithuanian bilingual

== J ==
- Jin Qizong (China, 1918–2004) Jurchen and Chinese bilingual
- John Jamieson (UK, 1759–1838) Lowland Scots language etymological
- Marcus Jastrow (Poland, 1829–1903) Talmudic language general
- Jauhari (Iraq?, 10th century) Arabic language alphabetical
- Christian Gottlieb Jöcher (Germany, 1694–1758) German biographical
- John of Genoa → Johannes Balbus
- Samuel Johnson (UK, 1709–1784) English general, A Dictionary of the English Language
- Alexander Keith Johnston (UK, 1804–1871) English LSP dictionary and atlas
- Dafydd Glyn Jones (Wales, born 1941) English and Welsh bilingual
- Eliza Grew Jones (US/Burma, 1803–1838) Siamese (Thai) and English bilingual
- Henry Stuart Jones (UK, 1867–1939) Greek and English
- Michael Josephs (Prussia/UK, 1763–1849), English and Hebrew
- Adoniram Judson (US/Myanmar, 1788–1850) Burmese and English bilingual
- Joseph Jungmann (Czechoslovakia, 1773–1847) Czech and German bilingual
- Daniel Juslenius (Finland, 1676–1752) Finnish general

== K ==
- Vuk Stefanović Karadžić (Serbia, 1787–1864) Serbian general
- Mahmud al-Kashgari (Turkey, 1005–1102), Uyghur language
- Bartol Kašić (Croatia, 1575–1650) Croatian and Italian bilingual
- John Samuel Kenyon (US, 1874–1959) English pronunciation
- Adam Kilgarriff (UK, 1960–2015) English and computer lexicography
- Barbara Ann Kipfer (US, born 1954) English general and LSP
- Ferdinand Kittel (Germany/India, 1832–1903) Kannada and English bilingual
- Friedrich Kluge (Germany, 1856–1926) German language etymological
- Grzegorz Knapski (Poland, 1561–1639) Polish, Latin and Greek thesaurus
- James Knowles (UK, 1759–1840) English pronunciation
- Władysław Kopaliński (Poland, 1907–2007) Polish etymological
- Emmanuel Kriaras (Greece, 1906–2014) Greek historical
- Raphael Kuhner (Germany, 1802–1878) Greek and Latin
- Hans Kurath (Austria/US, 1891–1992) English historical, dialect atlas

== L ==
- Sita Ram Lalas (India, 1908–1986) Rajasthani language historical
- Wilfred G. Lambert (England, 1926–2011) Assyrian language
- Edward William Lane (1801–1876) translation of medieval Arabic dictionaries to English
- Pierre Larousse (France, 1817–1875) French general dictionary and encyclopedic
- Donald Laycock (Australia, 1936–1988) languages of Papua New Guinea
- James Legge (UK/China, 1815–1897) Chinese language
- George William Lemon (UK, 1726–1797) English etymological
- John Lemprière (Jersey, 1765–1824) dictionary of classical proper names
- Charlton Thomas Lewis (1834–1904) Latin and English bilingual
- Matthias von Lexer (Germany, 1830–1892) German historical
- Li Fanwen (China, born 1932) Tangut and Chinese bilingual
- Henry Liddell (UK, 1811–1898) Greek and English bilingual lexicon
- Sven Lidman (Sweden, 1921–2011) Swedish encyclopedic
- Lin Yutang (China/US, 1895–1976) Chinese and English bilingual
- Samuel Linde (Poland, 1771–1847) Polish language general
- Émile Littré (France, 1801–1881) French language general
- Thomas Lloyd (Wales, 1673–1734) Welsh language
- Elias Lönnrot (Finland, 1802–1884) Finnish and Swedish bilingual

== M ==
- Mackintosh MacKay (Scotland, 1793–1873) probable earliest dictionary of Scots Gaelic (1828)
- Stepan Malkhasyants (Armenia, 1857–1947) Armenian language historical
- Mouloud Mammeri (Algeria, 1917–1989) Tamazight lexicography
- Francis Andrew March (US, 1825–1911) comparative linguistics, English historical
- Francis Mason (UK/US/Burma, 1799–1874) Burmese
- Percy C. Mather (UK/China, 1882–1933) Mongolian
- Robert Henry Mathews (Australia/China, 1877–1970) Chinese and English bilingual
- Johann Mattheson (Germany, 1681–1764) music, German
- Tom McArthur (UK), Dictionary Research Centre, University of Exeter
- Erin McKean (US, born 1971) English general and LSP
- Lambert McKenna (Ireland, 1870–1956) English and Irish bilingual
- Walter Henry Medhurst (UK/China, 1796–1857) Chinese and English bilingual
- Igor Mel'čuk (Russia/Canada, born 1932) French
- Gilles Ménage (France, 1613–1692) etymological dictionary of French
- Francisci a Mesgnien Meninski (1623–1698) first large Turkish-to-Latin
- Wilhelm Meyer-Lübke (Switzerland/Germany, 1861–1936) Romance languages
- Minamoto no Shitagō (Japan, 911–983) Japanese thesaurus
- William Chester Minor (Sri Lanka/US/UK, 1834–1920) English historical
- John Minsheu (England, 1560–1627) Spanish and English bilingual, 11-language multilingual dictionary
- María Moliner (Spain, 1900–1981) Spanish general
- Judah Monis (US, 1683–1764) Hebrew language
- Paul Monroe (US, 1869–1947) English encyclopedic
- Morohashi Tetsuji (Japan, 1883–1982) Chinese and Japanese bilingual
- Robert Morrison (UK/China, 1782–1834) Chinese and English bilingual
- Mahshid Moshiri (Iran, born 1951) Persian language pronunciation and LSP dictionaries
- Joseph Moxon (UK, 1627–1691) English LSP
- Kārlis Mīlenbahs (Latvia, 1853–1916) Latvian and German bilingual
- Wilhelm Max Müller (Germany/US, 1862–1919) Hebrew language
- Monier Monier-Williams (India/UK, 1819–1899) Sanskrit English
- Pamela Munro (US, born 1947) Native American language dictionaries
- James Murray (UK, 1837–1915) English historical
- Vladimir Müller (Russia, 1880 – before 1943) English–Russian

== N ==
- Hajime Nakamura (Japan, 1911–1999) Sanskrit and Pali languages
- Nathan ben Jehiel (Italy, c. 1035–1106) Hebrew
- William Allen Neilson (UK/US, 1869–1946) English general
- Andrew Nelson (US/Japan, 1893–1975) Japanese and English bilingual
- Jean Nicot (France, 1530–1600) French historical
- Sandro Nielsen (Denmark, born 1961) Danish LSP
- Njattyela Sreedharan (India, born 1938) Dravidian languages
- Nonius Marcellus (Italy, 3rd/4th centuries) Latin lexicon
- Jerry Norman (US, 1936–2012) Manchu-English

== O ==
- Niall Ó Dónaill (Ireland, 1908–1995) Irish and English bilingual
- John Ogilvie (UK, 1797–1867) English language general
- Charles Talbut Onions (UK, 1873–1965) English language historical
- Sulkhan-Saba Orbeliani (Georgia, 1658–1725) Georgian language general
- Oros of Alexandria (Egypt?, 5th century) Ancient Greek language
- Osbern of Gloucester (UK, 1123–1200) Latin language etymological
- Flora Osete (Spain, 1883–?), Spanish language
- Ōtsuki Fumihiko (Japan, 1847–1928) Japanese language general
- Sergei Ozhegov (Russia, 1900–1964) Russian language general

== P ==
- Condé Benoist Pallen (US, 1858–1929) English language encyclopedia
- Alfredo Panzini (Italy, 1863–1939) Italian general
- Eric Partridge (New Zealand/Australia/UK, 1894–1979) English slang
- Franz Passow (Germany, 1786–1933) Greek language historical
- Hermann Paul (Germany, 1846–1921) German language historical
- Andrew Pawley (Australia/New Zealand, 1941–2026) Austronesian languages
- Clemente Peani (Italy/India, 1731–1782) Malayalam language
- Edmund Peck (Canada, 1850–1924) Inaktitut and English bilingual
- Aaron Peckham (US) English language slang
- Philitas of Cos (Greece, c. 340–285 BC) Ancient Greek glossary
- Philo of Byblos (Greece, c. 64–141 AD) Ancient Greek dictionary of synonyms
- Sreekanteswaram Padmanabha Pillai (India, 1864–1946) Malayalam dictionary
- Iwo Cyprian Pogonowski (Poland, US, 1921–2016) Polish and English bilingual
- Julius Pollux (Egypt/Greece, 2nd century) Ancient Greek thesaurus
- Noah Porter (US, 1811–1892) English language general
- Malachy Postlewayt (UK, c. 1707–1767) English language LSP

== R ==
- Ola Raknes (Norway/US, 1887–1975) Norwegian and English bilingual
- Stanislovas Rapalionis (Lithuania/Germany, 1485–1545) Lithuanian language
- Rasmus Christian Rask (Denmark, 1787–1832) Indo-European comparative linguistics
- Allen Walker Read (US, 1906–2002) English language glossary
- James Redhouse (UK, 1811–1892) Turkish and English bilingual
- Gustaf Renvall (Finland, 1781–1841) Finnish language general
- Alain Rey (France, 1928–2020) French language general and LSP
- Barbara Reynolds (UK, 1914–2015) Italian language
- Kel Richards (Australia, born 1946) English language dialect
- César-Pierre Richelet (French, 1626–1698) French language general
- John Rider (UK/Ireland, 1562–1632) Latin language etymological
- William Rider (UK, 1723–1785) English language general
- Mark Ridley (England, 1560 – c. 1624) Russian/English and English/Russian
- Paul Robert (French, 1910–1980) French language general
- Nancy Roper (UK, 1918–2004) Nursing and medical dictionaries
- Joseph Francis Charles Rock (Austria/US/China, 1884–1962) Naxi and English bilingual
- Peter Mark Roget (UK, 1779–1869) English thesaurus
- Leo Rosten (Poland–Russia/US, 1908–1997) Hebrew and English lexicon

== S ==
- Rachel Saint (US/Ecuador/Africa, 1914–1994) Waorani dictionary
- Jean-Baptiste de La Curne de Sainte-Palaye (France, 1697–1781) French glossary
- William Salesbury (UK, c. 1520–1600) English and Welsh bilingual
- Pekka Sammallahti (Finland, born 1947) Sámi dictionaries
- Daniel Sanders (Germany, 1819–1897) German general
- Francisco J. Santamaría (Mexico, 1886–1963) Spanish dictionary of Americanisms
- Irene Saunders (US/China, living) Chinese and English bilingual
- Valentin Schindler (Germany, died 1604) Hebrew et al. five-language
- Steinar Schjøtt (Norway, 1844–1920) Norwegian and Danish bilingual
- Johann Gottlob Schneider (Germany, 1750–1822) Ancient Greek and German bilingual
- Ericus Schroderus (Sweden, 1608–1639) Latin and Scandinavian languages multilingual
- August Schumann (Germany, 1773–1826) German language dictionary of Saxony
- Norman W. Schur (US, 1907–1992) English lexicons
- Robert Scott (UK, 1811–1887) Ancient Greek and English bilingual
- Kurt Heinrich Sethe (Germany, 1869–1934) Ancient Egyptian language
- Stephen Sewall (US, 1734–1804) Hebrew language
- Sextus Pompeius Festus (Roman Empire, 2nd century) Ancient Latin etymological
- Shan-ul-Haq Haqqee (Pakistan/Canada, 1917–2005) Urdu language
- Jesse Sheidlower (US, born 1968) English language historical
- Thomas A. Sherwood (US, 1791–1879) English place names gazetteer
- David Shulman (US, 1912–2004) English language historical
- Natalia Shvedova (Russia, 1916–2009) Russian language explanatory
- Johannes Silvet (Estonia, 1895–1979) Estonian and English bilingual
- John Simpson (UK, born 1953) English language historical
- John McHardy Sinclair (UK, 1933–2007) English corpus linguistics, learners'
- Konstantinas Sirvydas (Lithuania, 1580–1631) Lithuanian–Latin–Polish trilingual
- Stephen Skinner (UK, 1623–1667) English etymological
- Johan Kristian Skougaard (Norway, 1847–1925) Norwegian and French bilingual
- Nicholas Slonimsky (Russia, 1894–1995) Musicology, biography and literary criticism
- Benjamin Eli Smith (US, 1857–1913) English general and LSP
- John Smith (US, died 1809) Hebrew
- William Smith (UK, 1813–1893) Greek and Romance languages LSP
- Knut Fredrik Söderwall (Sweden, 1842–1924) Old Swedish
- William Edward Soothill (UK/China, 1861–1935) Chinese language LSP
- Lewis Spence (UK, 1874–1955) English language LSP
- Alexander Spiers (UK/France, 1807–1869) English and French bilingual
- Izmail Sreznevsky (Russia, 1812–1880) Ancient Russian language historical
- Kory Stamper (US, living) Modern American/English
- Jan Stanisławski (Poland, 1893–1973) Polish and English bilingual
- Joakim Stulić (Croatia, 1730–1817) Croatian–Latin–Italian trilingual
- Nahum Stutchkoff (US, 1893–1965) Yiddish

== T ==
- John Van Nest Talmage (US/China, 1819–1892) Chinese and English bilingual
- Peter Tamony (US, 1902–1985) English LSP etymology
- Jack Thiessen (Canada, 1932–present) Plautdietsch
- Antoine Thomas (Belgium, 1644–1709) mathematics glossary
- Theodoor Gautier Thomas Pigeaud (Germany/Netherlands, 1899–1988) Javanese and Dutch
- Lewis Thorpe (UK, died 1977) French language
- Alf Torp (Norway, 1853–1916) Norwegian and Danish bilingual etymological

== U ==
- Martin Ulvestad (Norway/US, 1865–1942) English–Danish–Norwegian trilingual
- Laurence Urdang (US, 1927–2008) English language general
- Dmitry Ushakov (Russia, 1873–1942) Russian language general

== V ==
- Oreste Vaccari (Italy/Japan, died 1980) Japanese–English bilingual
- Johan Hendrik van Dale (Netherlands, 1828–1872) creator of Van Dale's Great Dictionary of the Dutch Language
- Louis Gustave Vapereau (France, 1819–1906) French LSP
- G. Venkatasubbaiah (India, 1913–2021) Kannada language general dictionary, Kannada and English bilingual
- Verrius Flaccus (Ancient Rome, c. 55 BC – 20 AD) Latin language orthographic
- Anna de Villiers (1900–1979), Afrikaans South African writer, lexicographer, and educator
- Faust Vrančić (Croatia, 1551–1617) Croatian et al. five-language

== W ==
- Magdi Wahba (Egypt, 1925–1991) Arabic and English bilingual
- Noël François de Wailly (France, 1724–1801) French language neologisms
- John Walker (UK, 1732–1807) English rhymes and pronunciation
- Fr. Paul Walsh (Ireland, 1885–1941) Irish place names and genealogy
- John Walters (Wales, 1721–1797) English and Welsh languages
- Wang Li (China, 1900–1986) Chinese dictionary of word families
- Grady Ward (US, born 1951) English thesaurus
- Oliver Wardrop (UK, 1864–1948) Georgian language
- Noah Webster (US, 1758–1843) English language general
- Edmund Weiner (UK, born 1950) English language historical
- William Dwight Whitney (US, 1827–1894) English language general dictionary, English and German bilingual
- Harischandra Wijayatunga (Sri Lanka, born 1931) Sinhala language general
- Samuel Wells Williams (US/China, 1812–1884) Chinese language dictionary, Cantonese language
- Miron Winslow (US/Sri Lanka, 1789–1864) Tamil and English bilingual
- Arok Wolvengrey (Canada, born 1965) Cree and English bilingual
- Joseph Emerson Worcester (US, 1784–1865) English general and LSP dictionaries
- Elizabeth Mary Wright (UK, 1863–1958) English dialect
- Joseph Wright (UK, 1855–1930) English dialect
- Henry Cecil Kennedy Wyld (UK, 1870–1945) English language general

== X ==
- Xu Shen (China, c. 58–147) Chinese character dictionary

== Y ==
- Robert W. Young (US, 1912–2007) Navajo language general
- Henry Yule (Scotland and India, 1820–1889), co-compiler of Hobson-Jobson ("A Glossary of Colloquial Anglo-Indian Words and Phrases, and of Kindred Terms, Etymological, Historical, Geographical and Discursive")

== Z ==
- Ladislav Zgusta (Czechoslovakia/US, 1924–2007) historical/comparative linguistics, onomastics, lexicography
- Ben Zimmer (US, born 1971) English language visual thesaurus
- Ghil'ad Zuckermann (Australia/Israel/Italy/UK, born 1971) Barngarla, Hebrew lexicology, phono-semantic matching, expert witness in lexicography

== See also ==
- List of linguists
