= Jan Stanisławski =

Jan Stanisławski may refer to:

- Jan Stanisławski (lexicographer) (1893–1973)
- Jan Stanisławski (painter) (1860–1907)
