= Dictionary of Old Norse Prose =

Dictionary of Old Norse

A Dictionary of Old Norse Prose (Danish: Ordbog over det norrøne prosasprog), abbreviated as ONP, is a dictionary of the vocabulary attested in medieval West Scandinavian prose texts. The dictionary is funded through the Arnamagnæan Commission and is based in the Department of Nordic Studies and Linguistics at the University of Copenhagen.

== History ==
The project began in 1939 and was intended to supplement Johan Fritzner’s Ordbog over det gamle norske Sprog and other nineteenth century lexicographical works. Work on the first printed volume began in 1989. Three more volumes were printed with the last appearing in 2004. In 2005 the dictionary moved to freely available online publication.

== Editors ==
- Aldís Sigurðardóttir
- Alex Speed Kjeldsen
- Bent Chr. Jacobsen
- Christopher Sanders
- Ellert Þór Jóhannsson
- Eva Rode
- Helle Degnbol
- James E. Knirk
- Johnny Lindholm
- Maria Arvidsson
- Pernille Ellyton
- Sheryl McDonald
- Simonetta Battista
- Tarrin Wills
- Þorbjörg Helgadóttir
- Þórdís Edda Jóhannesdóttir
