= Conation =

Category of mental action used in psychology and philosophy of mind

In the philosophy of mind, and in psychology, conation refers to the ability to apply intellectual energy to a task to achieve its completion or reach a solution. Conation may be distinguished from other mental phenomena, particularly cognition, and sensation, and has been described as "neglected" in comparison with these phenomena. It may overlap to some extent with the concept of motivation, but "the ability to focus and maintain persistent effort" has been seen as more pertinent to conation.

== Definitions ==
Merriam-Webster's online dictionary defines conation as "an inclination (as an instinct or drive) to act purposefully". The word comes from the Latin words conari (to try) and conatio (an attempt). Hannah et al. define "moral conation" as "the capacity to generate responsibility and motivation to take moral action in the face of adversity and persevere through challenges".

== History ==
Edwin Boring included a review of the history of the concept in his History of Experimental Psychology, published in 1929, referring to James Ward's typology of cognition, conation, and feeling, and to conation as George Stout's "famous doctrine". The division of the mind into cognition, conation (or desire), and feeling was also described by Immanuel Kant. However, Norman Schur more recently included the word "conation" among his 1000 most challenging (or oft-forgotten or unknown) words in the English language. For George Berkeley in his essay De Motu, it was a term to be avoided, because "we do not rightly understand" its meaning.

== Research ==
Neuropsychology researchers Ralph M. Reitan and Deborah Wolfson looked at the performance of specific tasks which were "judged to require conative ability" in a research study published in 2000 and surmised that "conation, which has been a neglected dimension of behavior in neuropsychological assessment, may be the missing link between cognitive ability and prediction of performance capabilities in everyday life". Recent development in education research reconceptualizes conation in the epistemic context, where disposition, motivation, goal orientation, and volition associated with knowledge co-construction are characterized, highlighting the social aspect of conation.

== See also ==
- Attentional control
- Conatus
- Determination
