= Verb displacement =

Verb displacement as it relates to prose, is a technique used to impart a lyrical or poetic feel to a phrase, sentence, or paragraph. This technique finds particular expression in minimalist literature.

Specifically, verb displacement involves only those verbs that can be displaced by the word "is" or its past tense "was." For instance, in this excerpt from the novel For Whom the Bell Tolls, instead of writing "He died in April," Ernest Hemingway displaces the verb "died" with "is," and thereby creates a more lyrical effect:

"Kashkin," Robert Jordan said. "That would be Kashkin."

"Yes," said Pablo. "It was a very rare name. Something like that. What became of him?"

"He is dead since April."

— For Whom the Bell Tolls, Ernest Hemingway

== Origins ==
The term as it relates to prose in literature (as opposed to poetry or linguistics) was first introduced in 2011 by Tom Heehler, author of The Well-Spoken Thesaurus, to describe one of the ways in which minimalist writers are able—consciously or otherwise—to enhance simple language without increasing complexity.

== See also ==
- Literary Minimalism
