= Conatus =

Innate inclination of a thing to continue to exist and enhance itself

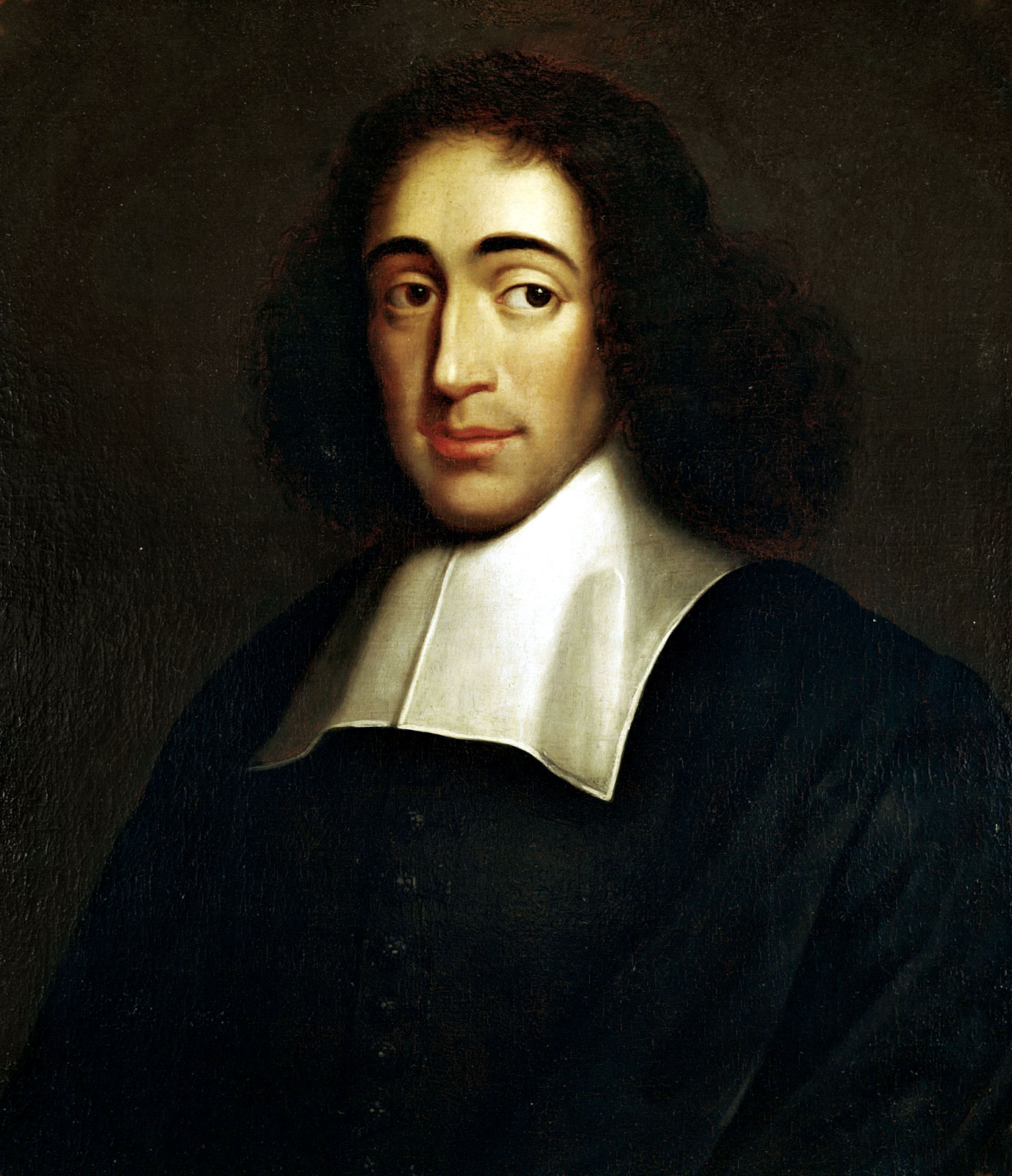
Conatus is, for Baruch Spinoza, where "each thing, as far as it lies in itself, strives to persevere in its being." (Note: Ethics, part 3, prop. 6)

In the philosophy of Baruch Spinoza, conatus (/koʊˈneɪtəs/; Latin for "effort; endeavor; impulse, inclination, tendency; undertaking; striving") is an innate inclination of a thing to continue to exist and enhance itself. This thing may be mind, matter, or a combination of both, and is often associated with God's will in a pantheist view of nature. The conatus may refer to the instinctive will to live of living organisms or to various metaphysical theories of motion and inertia. Today, conatus is rarely used in the technical sense, since classical mechanics uses concepts such as inertia and conservation of momentum that have superseded it. It has, however, been a notable influence on later thinkers such as Arthur Schopenhauer and Friedrich Nietzsche.

== Definition and origin ==
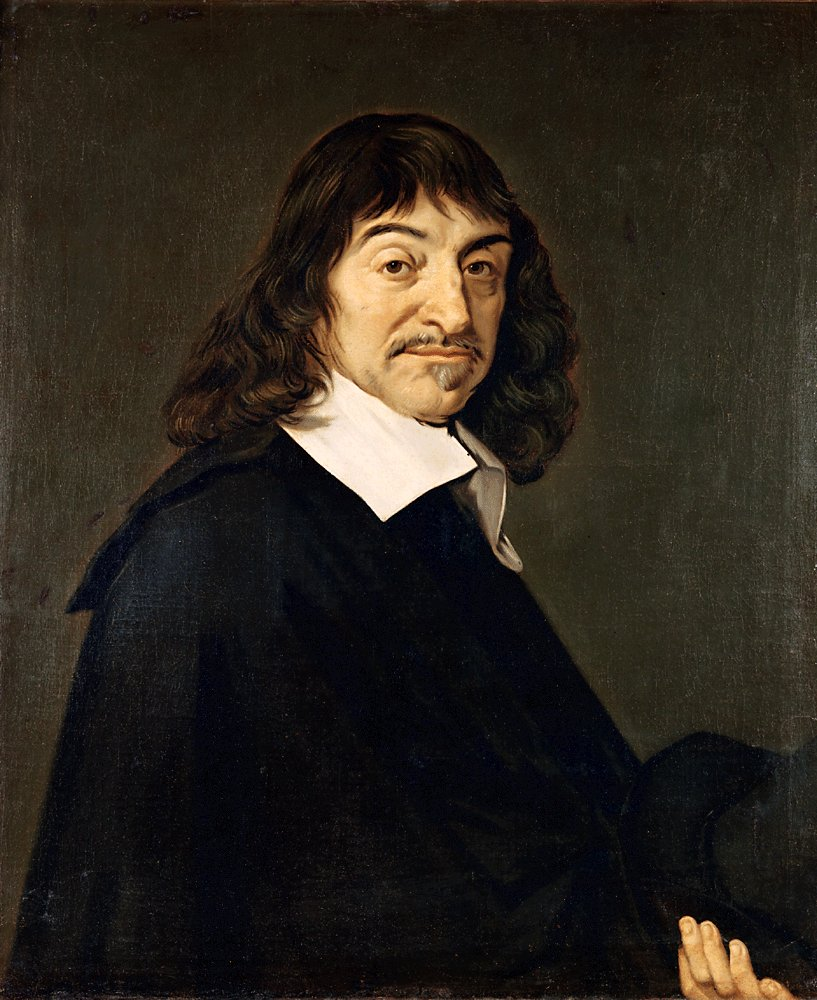
René Descartes used the term conatus in his mechanistic theory of motion.

The Latin cōnātus comes from the verb cōnor, which is usually translated into English as, to endeavor; used as an abstract noun, conatus is an innate inclination of a thing to continue to exist and enhance itself. Although the term is most central to Spinoza's philosophy, many other early modern philosophers including René Descartes, Gottfried Leibniz, and Thomas Hobbes made significant contributions, each developing the term differently.

Whereas the medieval Scholastic philosophers such as Jean Buridan developed a notion of impetus as a mysterious intrinsic property of things, René Descartes (1596–1650) developed a more modern, mechanistic concept of motion which he called the conatus. For Descartes, in contrast to Buridan, motion and rest are properties of the interactions of matter according to eternally fixed mechanical laws, not dispositions and intentions, nor as inherent properties or forces of things, but rather as a unifying, external characteristic of the physical universe itself. Descartes specifies two varieties of the conatus: conatus a centro, (Note: "tendency towards the center") or a theory of gravity and conatus recedendi (Note: "tendency away from the center") which represents centrifugal forces. Descartes, in developing his First Law of Nature, also invokes the idea of a conatus se movendi, or "conatus of self-preservation", a generalization of the principle of inertia, which was formalized by Isaac Newton and made into the first of his three Laws of Motion fifty years after the death of Descartes.

Thomas Hobbes criticized previous definitions of conatus for failing to explain the origin of motion, defining conatus to be the infinitesimal unit at the beginning of motion: an inclination in a specified direction. Furthermore, Hobbes uses conatus to describe cognition functions in the mind, describing emotion as the beginning of motion and the will as the sum of all emotions, which forms the conatus of a body and its physical manifestation is the perceived "will to survive". In a notion similar that of Hobbes, Gottfried Leibniz differentiates between the conatus of the body and soul, primarily focusing however on the concept of a conatus of body in developing the principles of integral calculus to explain Zeno's paradoxes of motion. Leibniz later defines the term monadic conatus, as the state of change through which his monads perpetually advance. This conatus is a sort of instantaneous or virtual motion that all things possess, even when they are static. Motion, meanwhile, is just the summation of all the conatuses that a thing has, along with the interactions of things. By summing an infinity of such conatuses (i.e., what is now called integration), Leibniz could measure the effect of a continuous force.

== In Spinoza's philosophy ==
Conatus is a central theme in the philosophy of Benedict de Spinoza (1632–1677), which is derived from principles that Hobbes and Descartes developed. Contrary to most philosophers of his time, Spinoza rejects the dualistic assumption that mind, intentionality, ethics, and freedom are to be treated as things separate from the natural world of physical objects and events. One significant change he makes to Hobbes' theory is his belief that the conatus ad motum (conatus to motion) is not mental, but material. Spinoza also uses conatus to refer to rudimentary concepts of inertia, as Descartes had earlier. According to Spinoza, "each thing, as far as it lies in itself, strives to persevere in its being" (Ethics, part 3, prop. 6). Since a thing cannot be destroyed without the action of external forces, motion and rest, too, exist indefinitely until disturbed. His goal is to provide a unified explanation of all these things within a naturalistic framework, man and nature must be unified under a consistent set of laws; God and nature are one, and there is no free will. For example, an action is free, for Spinoza, only if it arises from the essence and conatus of an entity. However, an action can still be free in the sense that it is not constrained or otherwise subject to external forces. Human beings are thus an integral part of nature. Spinoza explains seemingly irregular human behaviour as really natural and rational and motivated by this principle of the conatus. Some have argued that the conatus consists of happiness and the perpetual drive toward perfection. Conversely, a person is saddened by anything that opposes his conatus. Others have associated desire, a primary affect, with the conatus principle of Spinoza. Desire is then controlled by the other affects, pleasure and pain, and thus the conatus strives towards that which causes joy and avoids that which produces pain.

== Later usages and related concepts ==
After the development of classical mechanics, the concept of a conatus, in the sense used by philosophers other than Spinoza, an intrinsic property of all physical bodies, was largely superseded by the principles of inertia and conservation of momentum. Similarly, Conatus recedendi became centrifugal force, and conatus a centro became gravity. However, Giambattista Vico, inspired by Neoplatonism, explicitly rejected the principle of inertia and the laws of motion of the new physics. For him, conatus was the essence of human society, and also, in a more traditional, hylozoistic sense, as the generating power of movement which pervades all of nature, which was composed neither of atoms, as in the dominant view, nor of extension, as in Descartes, but of metaphysical points animated by a conatus principle provoked by God. Arthur Schopenhauer (1788–1860) developed a principle notably similar to that of Spinoza's conatus. This principle, Wille zum Leben, or of a "Will to Live", described the specific phenomenon of an organism's self-preservation instinct. Schopenhauer qualified this, however, by suggesting that the Will to Live is not limited in duration, but rather, "the will wills absolutely and for all time", across generations. Rejecting the primacy of Schopenhauer's Will to Live, Friedrich Nietzsche (1844–1900) developed a separate principle the Will to Power, which comes out of a rejection of such notions of self-preservation. In systems theory, the Spinozistic conception of a conatus has been related to modern theories of autopoiesis in biological systems. However, the scope of the idea is definitely narrower today, being explained in terms of chemistry and neurology where, before, it was a matter of metaphysics and theurgy.

== See also ==
- Conation
- Teleonomy
