= Oreste Vaccari =

Italian Orientalist and linguist

Oreste Vaccari (1886 - 1980) was an Italian Orientalist and linguist.

He was a pupil at the Royal Oriental Institute of Naples during the second decade of the 20th century, where his instructors included Afevork Ghevre Jesus, who taught him Amharic and eventually became the chargé d'affaires of the Ethiopian delegation to Rome. After his studies, Vaccari obtained a posting in Japan as a correspondent for The Japan Times and Mail, and also taught foreign languages at the Athénée Français of Tokyo, being fluent in French and English besides his native Italian. In 1935, he married a Japanese woman, Enko Elisa Vaccari (1896-1983), who had graduated in English from Jissen Women's College, and would support him in his various linguistic projects during the rest of his career. Vaccari was responsible for translating Blattengeta Heruy Welde Sellase's Mahidere Birhan: Hagre Japan (The Document of Japan) (1934), a seminal work in Japanese-Ethiopian relations, from the original Amharic into English, which was then rendered into Japanese by his wife. During the Italian invasion of Ethiopia in 1935, Vaccari wrote defenses of Italy's actions.

Together with his wife, Vaccari prepared many books to help foreign learners of Japanese, and his most popular works included the New Up-to-date English-Japanese Conversation Dictionary and Vaccari's Concise English-Japanese Japanese-English Dictionary (all published by Maruzen). In 1972, the couple began work on Vaccari's Standard Japanese-English Dictionary (ヴァカーリスタンダード和英辞典 Vakāri Sutandādo Wa-Ei Jiten), considered to be the culmination of their lifetime's study. After Oreste began to suffer deteriorating health in 1975 (dying in 1980), the task of completing the Dictionary fell to Elisa. The Dictionary was finished in 1982, before Elisa's death the following year. Elisa's will provided that the dictionary be published with the money she bequeathed, and directed that the royalties be used to fund scholarships for foreign students of Japanese, in cooperation with the Jochi Corporation with which the Vaccaris had been closely associated. Sophia University of Tokyo finally published the Dictionary in 1990.
