= The Well-Spoken Thesaurus =

- Author: Tom Heehler
- Language: English
- Subject: Style guide
- Publisher: Sourcebooks
- Publication date: 2011
- Publication place: United States
- Media type: Paperback book
- Pages: 400
- ISBN: 1-4022-4305-7
- Dewey Decimal: 413.12
- LC Class: PE1591 .H397 2011

The Well-Spoken Thesaurus by Tom Heehler (Sourcebooks 2011), is an American style guide and speaking aid. The Chicago Tribune calls The Well-Spoken Thesaurus "a celebration of the spoken word". The book has also been reviewed in the Winnipeg Free Press, and by bloggers at the Fayetteville Observer, and the Seattle Post-Intelligencer.

== Content ==
The book consists of two sections—a 50-page style guide entitled "Rhetorical Form and Design", and a 350-page thesaurus section. However, what distinguishes this thesaurus from all conventional thesauri is the inclusion of what the author calls rhetorically related words, or elonyms—as opposed to merely synonymous words. According to Heehler, these elonyms allow users to more readily transform rough drafts into more eloquent improvements.

In "Rhetorical Form and Design," Heehler serves up 17 lessons from such writers and speakers as T.S. Eliot, Margaret Atwood, John Steinbeck, Ernest Hemingway, Barack Obama, Martin Luther King Jr., and Cintra Wilson. Rhetorical and literary techniques covered include the objective correlative, rhetorical objectification, verb displacement, rhetorical agency, rhetorical tension, poetic articles, preposition exchange, creative number, and intuitive description.

== Origins ==
According to Heehler, the idea for The Well-Spoken Thesaurus came to him while attending the Harvard Extension School, where he came to realize just how poorly spoken he truly was. And because there were no books available with which to solve his problem, he began to create a database of eloquent words. Whenever he would chance upon a well-spoken word or phrase at Harvard, he would pair that with what he would have said. After three years of doing this, of "collecting words like butterflies," he decided that his "butterfly collection" could be of use to others.
