= William Q. De Funiak =

William Quinby De Funiak (November 16, 1901 – November 2, 1981) was an American writer and law academic who wrote what was probably the first systematic American-British, British-American dictionary: American-British, British-American Dictionary With Helpful Hints for Travelers. It was published in the 1960s.

He was born in Alabama and traveled abroad to lecture and study and visited Britain a good deal. He noted the linguistic differences between American English and British English and decided to produce a detailed glossary to aid the "two peoples separated by a common language" (as George Bernard Shaw put it). As a regular traveler, De Funiak focused particularly on the needs of the business traveler such as transport, food, lodging and entertainment. The dictionary was last reprinted in 1978 and is still available, though the advice for travelers is now somewhat out of date. He died in Santa Cruz, California in 1981, at age 79.

== Selected works ==
- De Funiak; William Quinby (1971). Principles of community property. Tucson: University of Arizona Press. ISBN 0-8165-0264-1.
- Reppy Jr., William A.; De Funiak, William Quinby (1975). Community Property in the United States: A Comparative Study by Cases, Materials, and Problems. ISBN 0-672-82067-6.
- De Funiak; William Quinby (1978). The American-British, British-American Dictionary. South Brunswick. ISBN 0-498-02231-5.
