= Johan Fritzner =

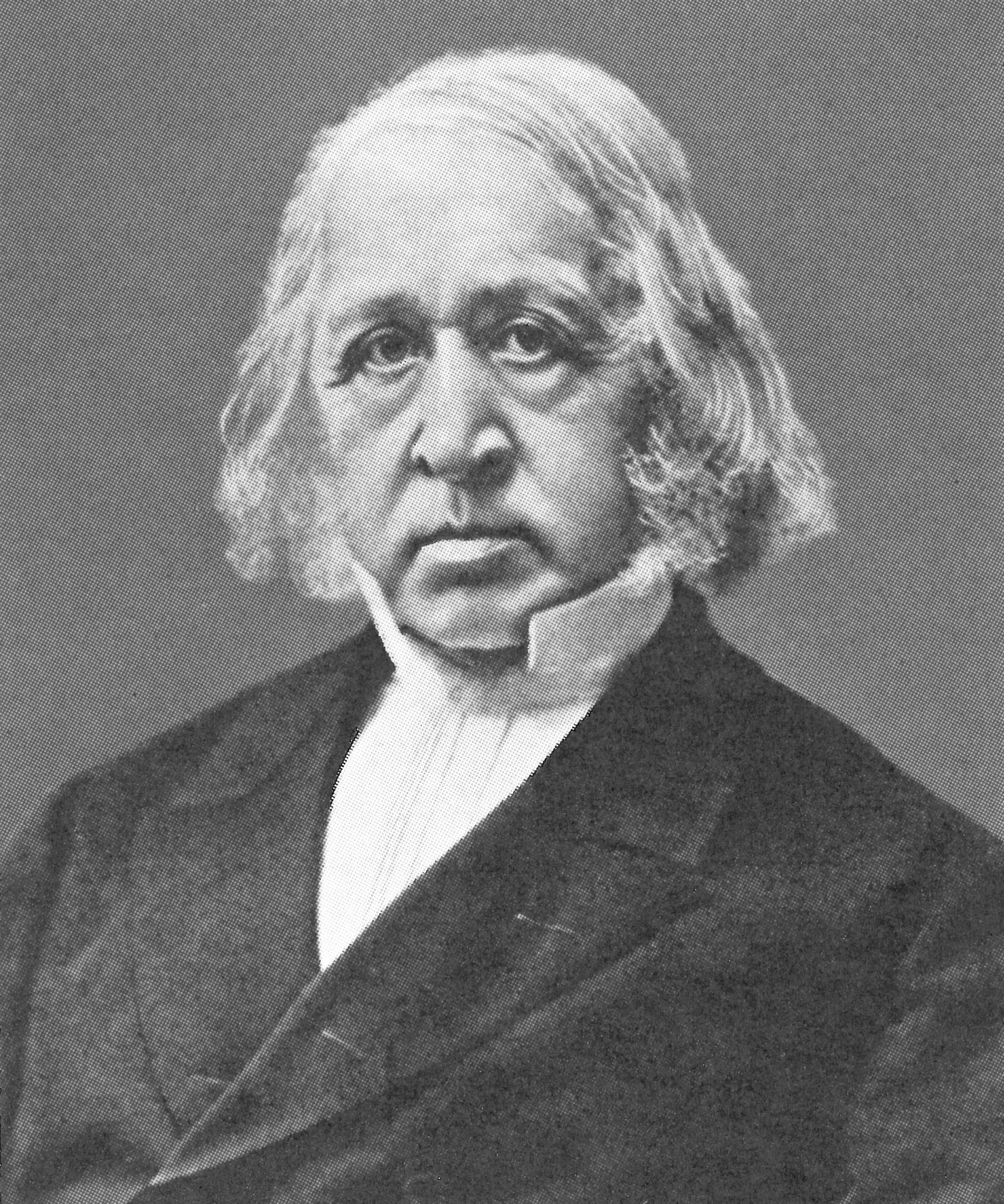
- Born: April 9, 1812; Askøy, Hordaland
- Died: December 10, 1893; Christiania

Johan Fritzner (9 April 1812 - 10 December 1893) was a Norwegian priest and lexicographer. He is known for his magnum opus Ordbog over det gamle norske Sprog, a major dictionary of Old Norse vocabulary.
