= Hoke Sein =

Burmese linguist and lexicographer

- ဟုတ်စိန်
- Born: 4 February 1890; Bassein, British Burma
- Died: 31 July 1984 (aged 94); Rangoon, Burma
- Occupations: Lexicographer; attorney

Hoke Sein (Burmese: ဟုတ်စိန်; 1890–1984; also spelt Hok Sein) was a Burmese linguist and lexicographer, best known for compiling the influential Universal Burmese-English-Pali Dictionary still used by Pali and Burmese language scholars today.

== Early life and education ==
Hoke Sein was born on 4 February 1890 in the Irrawaddy delta town of Bassein (now Pathein), to merchants Boon Fong and Kyin Hmone, who were devout Buddhists and patrons of a local monastery. At the age of 8, Hoke Sein and his family moved to Rangoon (now Yangon). He matriculated with an LLB degree. Hoke Sein ranked first in the country, in both his 7th grade and University Entrance Examinations.

== Career ==
Hoke Sein became a civil servant, eventually retiring in 1969 as a lead government attorney. While studying Pali in college, he fostered an interest in Pali literature. His interest in lexicography and proficiency in languages, including Pali, Burmese, English, Chinese, and Hindi, led him to compile comprehensive Pali dictionaries to foster Buddhist studies, especially among Buddhist monks. He published Pali-English, Pali-Burmese (1956), Burmese-Pali, and Burmese-English-Pali dictionaries. His final dictionary was published in August 1977, at which point he was already 87 years old.

== Personal life ==
Hoke Sein married Mya May (d. 1979), with whom he had six children. Hoke Sein died on 31 July 1984 in Rangoon (now Yangon).

== Publications ==
- Pali-Burmese Dictionary (1956)
- Universal Burmese-English-Pali Dictionary (1978)
