= Henry Cockeram =

Henry Cockeram (dates unknown; flourished 1623–1658) was an English lexicographer. In 1623, he authored the third known English Language dictionary, and the first to contain the title "dictionary".

== Life ==
Little is known about Cockeram beyond the fact that he authored this work. From the various dedications in his works, it is apparent that he lived in Exeter, England, where contemporary records suggest that he could be the Henrye Cockram who married Elizabethe Strashley, on 2 February 1613. The dedications and prefixes on the first edition show a friendship with John Webster, the playwright, who wrote:

To over-praise this book in a smooth line,
(If any error's in 't,), thy would make it mine:
Only, while words for payment pass at court,
And whilst loud talk and wrangling make resort,
I' the term, to Westminster, I do dread
Thy leaves shall scrape the Scombri, and be read;
And I will add this my friend, no poet,
Thou hast toil'd to purpose, and the event will shew it.

Cockeram's dictionary was not intended to be an exhaustive list of words and definitions. As he states on the title page of his first edition, it was to aid "[l]adies and Gentlewomen, young Schollers, Clarkes, Merchants, as also Strangers of any Nation, to the understanding of the more difficult Authors already printed in our Language". In terms of sources for his work, Cockeram turned to John Bullokar, who authored another dictionary, the English Expositor, in 1616. It is almost certain that Cockeram took many of his definitions from a Dutchman, known only as A. M., who translated Oswald Gaebelkhover's famous medical journal, Boock of Physicke, from Dutch into English. James A. Riddell gives evidence that other sources likely to have been used include Thomas Dekker's The Strange Horse Race of 1613. Cockeram went through the book, locating words that could be included, and when he found a word that was used in Robert Cawdrey's Table Alphbeticall (the first known dictionary of English), he copied Cawdrey's definition. Cockeram acknowledged the use of other lexicographers on the title page of his dictionary; on one edition, it said that the work was "a Collection of the choicest words contained in the Table Alphabeticall and the English Expositor, and of some thousand of words never published by any heretofore". Despite this, he translated or Anglicised a number of words, shown in the Oxford English Dictionary, which attributes the source of approximately 600 words to Cockeram's dictionary.

The dictionary was a general success, and did not meet with much contemporary criticism. It went through eleven editions between 1623 and 1658, and until 1656, Bullokar's English Expositor was its only rival.
