= Norman W. Schur =

American lawyer and lexicographer

Norman W. Schur (1907–1992) was an American lawyer and lexicographer. Schur was born in Boston, Massachusetts, graduating from Boston Latin School before he learned Greek, French, German, Latin and Italian, and graduated from Harvard University in 1927. He spent a year on a fellowship in Italy and France before returning to spend a year at Harvard Law School (before transferring to Columbia). After graduating from law school at Columbia, Schur practiced law in both the United States and United Kingdom for over 50 years before turning his attention to his lifelong love of words and authoring several lexicons.

== Bibliography of his works ==
- British Self-Taught: With Comments in American (1973) Macmillan. ISBN 9780717920280
- English English: A Descriptive Dictionary (1978) Verbatim Books. ISBN 0930454057
- 1000 Most Important Words (1981) Ballantine Books. ISBN 0345298632
- Practical English: 1000 Most Effective Words (1983) Ballantine Books. ISBN 0345310381
- 1000 Most Practical Words (1983) Facts On File. ISBN 0871968681
- 1000 Most Challenging Words (1988) Facts On File. ISBN 0816011966
- 1000 Most Obscure Words (1990) Facts On File. ISBN 0816020140
- British English A to Zed (1991) Harper Perennial. ISBN 9781626364677
- The Facts on File student's thesaurus (1991) Facts On File. ISBN 0816016348
- 2000 Most Challenging and Obscure Words (1994) Galahad Books. ISBN 0883658488
- British English A to Zed, revised by Eugene Ehrlich (2001) Facts on File. ISBN 9780816064564
