= Jan Stanisławski (lexicographer) =

Polish lexicographer

Jan Stanisławski (1893–1973) was a Polish lexicographer.

Before World War II, as a lecturer in English at the Jagiellonian University in Kraków, Poland, Stanisławski compiled an English-Polish, Polish-English dictionary. This one-volume dictionary was reprinted during World War II in Great Britain (first reprint, March 1940).

Stanisławski, with the assistance of Wiktor Jassem, subsequently augmented this modest dictionary into what became Wielki słownik angielsko-polski [The Great English-Polish Dictionary] (first published 1964) and Wielki słownik polsko-angielski [The Great Polish-English Dictionary] (first published 1969), both of which have been reprinted many times subsequently.

== See also ==
- List of Poles
