= Macquarie Dictionary =

Dictionary of Australian English

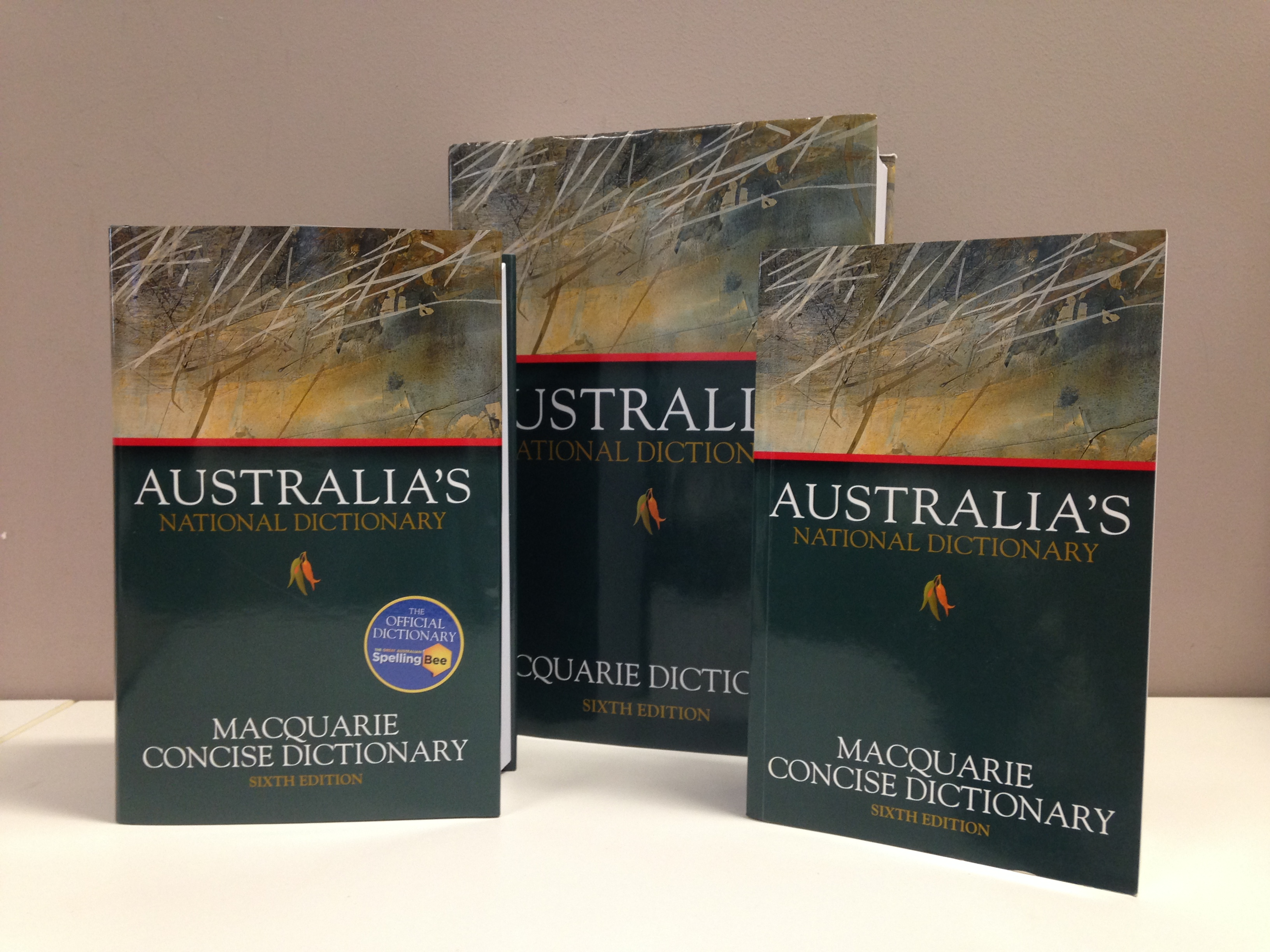
- The Macquarie Dictionary, 6th edition
- Language: Australian English, New Zealand English
- Subject: Dictionary
- Publisher: Macquarie Dictionary Publishers
- Publication date: 1981, 1991, 1997, 2005, 2009, 2013, 2017, 2020, 2023
- Publication place: Australia
- Media type: Print, digital
- Website: www.macquariedictionary.com.au

The Macquarie Dictionary (/məˈkwɒri/) is a dictionary of Australian English. It is considered by many to be the standard reference on Australian English. It also pays considerable attention to New Zealand English. Originally it was a publishing project of Jacaranda Press, a Brisbane educational publisher, for which an editorial committee was formed, largely from the Linguistics department of Macquarie University in Sydney, Australia. It is now published by Macquarie Dictionary Publishers, an imprint of Pan Macmillan Australia Pty Ltd. In October 2007 it moved its editorial office from Macquarie University to the University of Sydney, and later to the Pan Macmillan offices in the Sydney central business district.

In addition to its two-volume flagship dictionary, shorter editions including the Macquarie Concise Dictionary, Macquarie Compact Dictionary, Macquarie Budget Dictionary and Macquarie Little Dictionary are published.

== History ==
The first seven editions of the Macquarie Dictionary were edited by lexicographer Susan Butler, who joined the project in 1970 as a research assistant, and was its chief editor by the time the first edition was published in 1981. Butler retired as the Macquarie's editor in March 2018 after 48 years with the publisher.

A detailed history of the dictionary and its associated publications is Pat Manser's More Than Words: The Making of the Macquarie Dictionary (Sydney: Macquarie Dictionary, 2021).

=== First Edition ===
The original version of the Macquarie Dictionary was based on Hamlyn's Encyclopedic World Dictionary of 1971, which in turn was based on Random House's American College Dictionary of 1947, which was based on the 1927 New Century Dictionary, which was based on The Imperial Dictionary of the English Language, which itself was based on Noah Webster's American Dictionary of the English Language second edition of 1841.

The first edition had an introduction by Australian historian Manning Clark.

Since its first publication in 1981, its use has grown so that it has come to rival longer-established dictionaries from elsewhere in the English-speaking world as a standard authority on the English language within Australia.

=== Second Edition ===
The second edition was published in 1991 and introduced encyclopedic content to many entries. It has an introduction by Australian author Donald Horne.

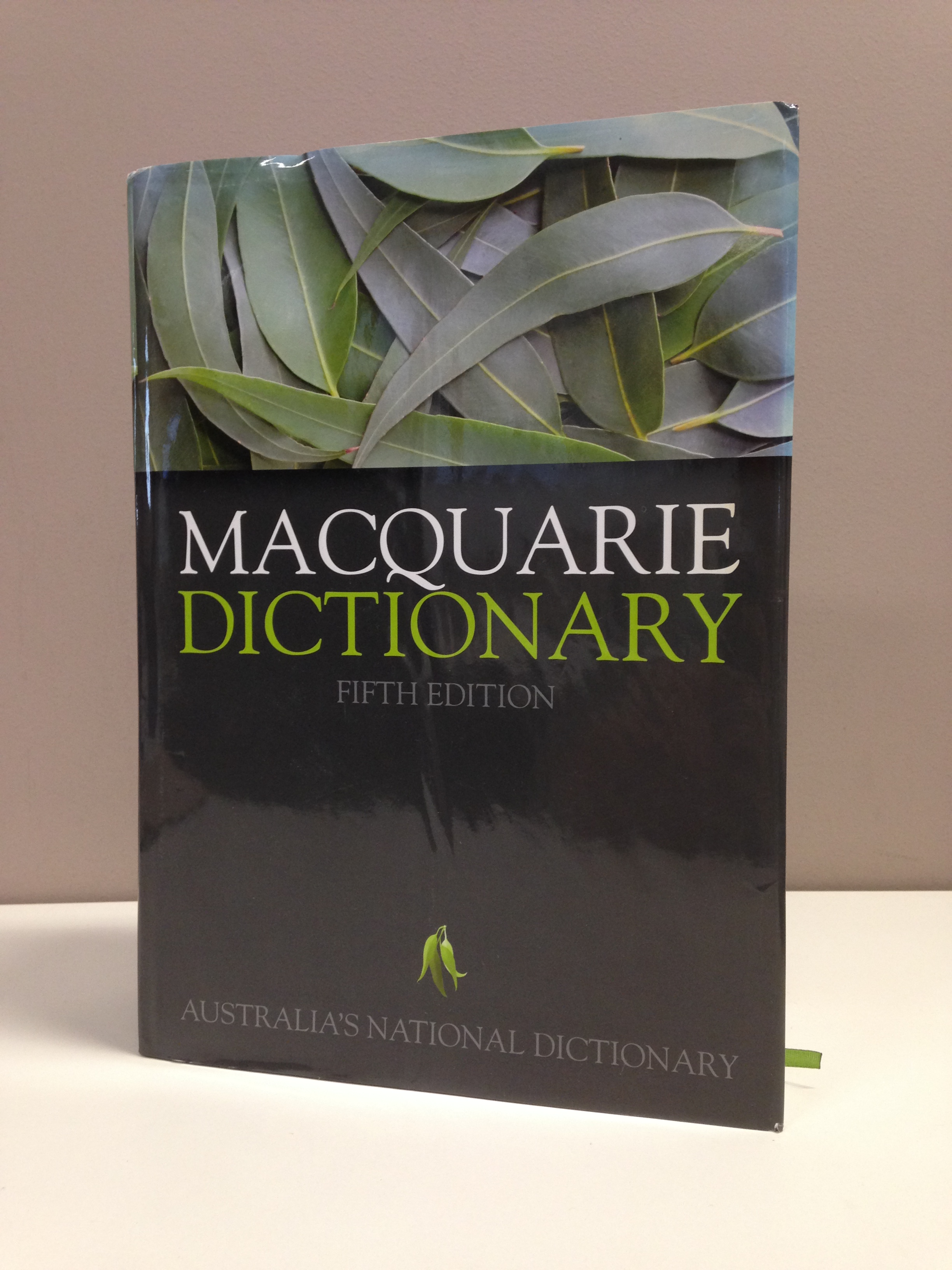
The Macquarie Dictionary Fifth Edition

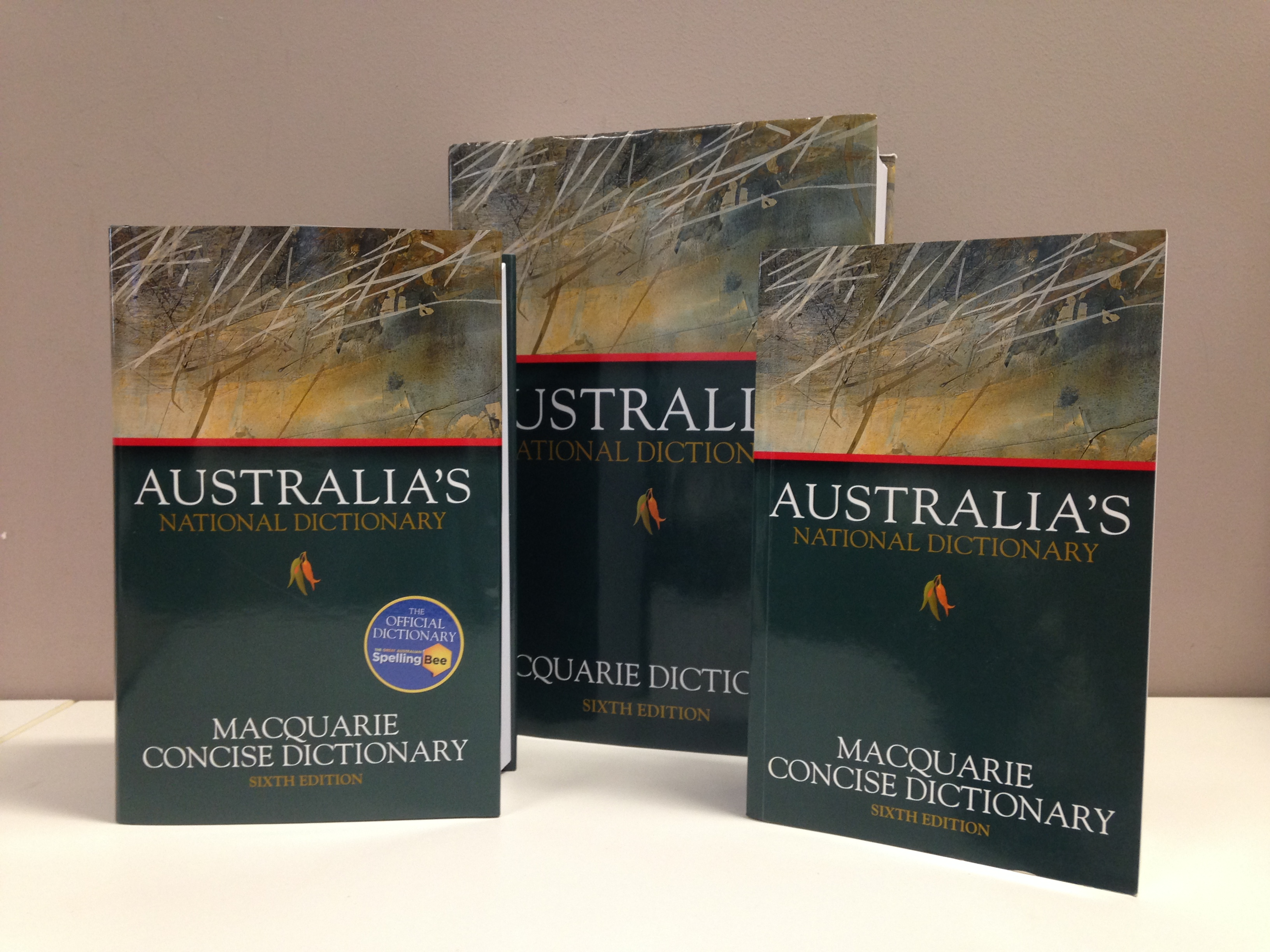
The Macquarie Dictionary Sixth Edition

=== Third Edition ===
The third edition, published in 1997, made use of an in-house corpus of Australian writing, Ozcorp, to add a large number of examples of Australian usage, to give some of the flavour of an historical dictionary. This edition also gave a good coverage of English in Asia. It has an introduction by Australian author David Malouf.

=== Fourth Edition ===
The fourth edition, published in 2005, increased the number of citations, includes etymologies for many phrases, and pays particular attention to Australian regionalisms. It has an introduction by Australian author Thomas Keneally.

=== Fifth Edition ===
The fifth edition was published in October 2009 and places particular emphasis on words relating to the environment and climate change. It has an introduction by the then Australian Governor-General Quentin Bryce.

=== Sixth Edition ===
The sixth edition was published in October 2013 and includes an update of new words and senses as well as words and phrases from other varieties of English that impinge on Australian English, such as British English, American English and English in Southeast Asia, China and India. It has an introduction by Australian author Les Murray.

=== Seventh Edition ===
The seventh edition of the Macquarie Dictionary was published on 28 February 2017. With a foreword by Australian author Kate Grenville, this edition included thousands of new words and senses along with Australian regionalisms and a collection of words from the Australian experience in World War I.

=== Eighth Edition ===
The eighth edition of the Macquarie Dictionary was published on 28 July 2020. With a foreword by Australian author Kim Scott, it featured 3500 new entries.

=== Ninth Edition ===
The ninth edition of the Macquarie Dictionary was published on 12 September 2023. With a foreword by Australian author Markus Zusak, the ninth edition featured hundreds of new entries and updated definitions.

- Macquarie Dictionary (9th ed.). Sydney: Macquarie Dictionary Publishers. 2023. ISBN 978-1-76126-774-1. OCLC 1404465502. Wikidata Q131699522.

== Preferred spellings ==
The dictionary records standard Australian English spelling, which is closer to British than American spelling, with spellings like colour, centre, defence and practice/practise (noun/verb). It gives -ise spellings first, listing -ize spellings as acceptable variants, unlike the Oxford English Dictionary and some other dictionaries of British English, which continue to prefer -ize to -ise in spite of the opposite tendency among the British general public (see Oxford spelling). Labour, however, is spelt Labor when referring to the Australian political party. One difference from British spelling is the noun program, which the Macquarie Dictionary gives as the preferred spelling in preference to programme.

== Collaborations ==
=== Word of the Year ===
Each year the editors select a short-list of new words added to the dictionary, and invite the public to vote on their favourite. The public vote is held in December and results in the People's Choice winner. There is also a word selected by a committee.

=== Word for Word podcast ===
The team behind the Macquarie Dictionary produced a podcast called Word for Word from 2016 through to the end of 2021. The podcast explored surprising histories behind everyday words and phrases, went behind the scenes with the dictionary editors, and highlighted some of Australia's word lovers, from Scrabble champions to hip-hop artists.

== Versions ==
A number of smaller versions of the dictionary are available, including a compact edition, as well as companion volumes such as a thesaurus. The latest edition of the main complete version of the Macquarie Dictionary is the ninth, published in 2023. Both the complete dictionary and a student dictionary are available as iOS applications.

=== Macquarie Dictionary Online ===
The Macquarie Dictionary Online is the most comprehensive and up-to-date version of the dictionary available, with new words, phrases, and definitions added twice annually. It has the greatest coverage of encyclopedic and non-encyclopedic entries, and provides spoken pronunciations. Subscriptions are available to the complete version as well as a student version.

=== Apps ===
The Macquarie Dictionary is available in two iOS app editions: the Macquarie Dictionary Complete app, and the Macquarie School Dictionary app, as well as an Android app edition.

== See also ==
- WordGenius, an electronic dictionary publishing system used by the Macquarie Dictionary
