= Barnhart =

Surname list

Barnhart is a surname. Notable people with the surname include:

- Berta Barnhart, member of Seattle City Planning Commission
- Brian Barnhart, American auto racing executive
- Clarence Barnhart (1900–1993), American lexicographer
- Clyde Barnhart (1895–1980), American baseball player
- Dan Barnhart (1912–1965), American football player
- David Barnhart (born 1941), American lexicographer
- Ed Barnhart (born 1968), American archaeologist and explorer
- Edgar Barnhart (1904–1984), American baseball pitcher
- Gordon Barnhart (born 1945), Canadian politician
- Henry A. Barnhart (1858–1934), American politician
- Jeffrey L. Barnhart (born 1956), American politician
- Jennifer Barnhart (born 1972), American puppeteer and actress
- Jo Anne B. Barnhart (born 1950), American civil servant
- John Hendley Barnhart (1871–1949), American botanist and author
- Karsen Barnhart (born 2001), American football player
- Katie Barnhart, American figure skater
- Les Barnhart (1905–1971), American baseball player
- Martha Barnhart, American civic leader
- Mitch Barnhart (born 1959), American athletic director
- Nicole Barnhart (born 1981), American soccer goalkeeper
- Peter Barnhart, Canadian settler
- Phil Barnhart (born 1946), American politician
- Phyllis Barnhart (1922–2008), American animator and cel painter
- Ray Barnhart (1928–2013), American politician
- Robert Barnhart (1933–2007), American lexicographer
- Tony Barnhart (born 1953), American reporter
- Tucker Barnhart (born 1991), American baseball player
- Vic Barnhart (1922–2017), American baseball player
