= W. Cabell Greet =

- Born: 28 January 1901; El Paso, Texas, US
- Died: 19 December 1972 (aged 71); Santa Barbara, California, US

Academic background
- Education: Columbia University; University of the South

Academic work
- Institutions: Barnard College
- Notable works: War Words: Recommended Pronunciations

William Cabell Greet (28 January 1901, in El Paso, Texas – 19 December 1972, in Santa Barbara, California) was an American philologist and a professor of English.

He graduated as valedictorian with a bachelor's degree in 1920 from Sewanee's University of the South. In the early 1920s he was an instructor at the University of Texas, the University of Colorado, and the University of California. At Columbia University he graduated with M.A. in 1924 and Ph.D. in 1926. He joined Barnard College's faculty in 1926, was appointed McIntosh Professor of English in 1953, and was department chair until he became professor emeritus in 1966.

From 1931 to about 1942, Greet and George W. Hibbitt created and disseminated an audio archive of poetry readings by a number of famous American poets.

The poets recorded as part of the series include: Vachel Lindsay, Harriet Monroe, James Weldon Johnson, Gertrude Stein, Edgar Lee Masters, William Carlos Williams, Mark Van Doren, Edna St. Vincent Millay, T.S. Eliot, Robert Frost, W.H. Auden, Archibald MacLeish, Alfred Kreymborg, John Gould Fletcher, Robert Tristram Coffin, Conrad Aiken, "AE" (George Russell), Carl Sandburg, and John Hall Wheelock.

Greet was editor-in-chief of the journal American Speech from 1933 to 1952.

For 30 years, he served as a speech consultant to newscasters and correspondents of the Columbia Broadcasting System. And he was an educational adviser to the publishers of the Funk and Wagnalls College Dictionary, the American College Dictionary, the Century Encyclopedia of Names and the Thorndike‐Barnhardt Dictionary.

He was the author of War Words: Recommended Pronunciations (published in 1943 for Columbia Broadcasting System by Columbia University Press); the book gave the pronunciations of thousands of foreign words, names, and battlefields in WW II. The book was enlarged to World Words: Recommended Pronunciations (1944) and published in a 2nd edition in 1948.

Greet made recordings demonstrating American vowels and diphthongs for language-teaching company Linguaphone (company).

He donated to Columbia University a collection of letters he received from famous American authors, including John Mason Brown, John Cheever, John Dos Passos, Marianne Moore, and H. L. Mencken, as well many public officials, including Henry A. Wallace, George Marshall, Cordell Hull, and J. Edgar Hoover.

Greet married Katherine E. Hyde on 11 September 1926 in Manhattan. Upon his death in 1971 he was survived by his widow and a daughter, Anne Greet Cushing, of Santa Barbara. His widow Katherine was born on 20 June 1897 in Elmira, New York and died in February 1986 in Santa Barbara. In 1965 Anne H. Greet married John E. Cushing (1918–2001), a biology professor at the University of California, Santa Barbara. In 1970 Anne Greet Cushing was appointed an associate professor of French and Italian at U.C. Santa Barbara. She was a Guggenheim Fellow for the academic year 1972–1973.
