= David Barnhart =

American lexicographer

David K. Barnhart (born 1941) is an American lexicographer who specializes in new words. He's also the founder of Lexik House publishers. Barnhart began his career helping his father, Clarence Barnhart, edit the Thorndike-Barnhart dictionary series. In 1980, he founded Lexik House publishers. Barnhart wrote Neo Words: A Dictionary of the Newest and Most Unusual Words of Our Time (1991), created The Barnhart New-Words Concordance (1994) and its Supplement (2006), and compiled Barnhart's Never-finished Political Dictionary of the 21st Century.

With Allan A. Metcalf, Barnhart wrote America in So Many Words: Words that have shaped America (1997). Barnhart has worked as a teacher, lecturer, and as an expert witness reporting on usage and meaning in English words. He's a past president of the Dictionary Society of North America and the International Linguistic Association. He is a member of the American Dialect Society.

== Biography ==
Barnhart was born about 1941, the son of Clarence Barnhart. He began his career helping his father, Clarence Barnhart, edit the Thorndike-Barnhart dictionary series.

Barnhart began studying for a doctorate in linguistics at NYU, then taught at prep school before working for his father's publishing house.

In 1980, he founded Lexik House Publishers. In the 1980s, Lexik House published:

- ТРОйКА--The TROIKA Introduction to Russian Letters and sounds (c. 1980) by Reason A. Goodwin;
- The Dictionary of Bahamian English (c. 1982) by John A. Holm with Alison Watt Shilling; and
- The Dictionary of Gambling and Gaming by Thomas L. Clark (1987).

In 1982, he and his father, began work on The Barnhart Dictionary Companion, a quarterly publication documenting appearance of new words, new meanings and new usages in English. This carries on the tradition of the Barnhart Dictionary of New English series (edited by his father, brother Robert Barnhart, and Sol Steinmetz), which was last published in 2001.

Barnhart wrote Neo Words: A Dictionary of the Newest and Most Unusual Words of Our Time (1991). He created The Barnhart New-Words Concordance (1994) and its Supplement (2006), an index to the words contained in numerous new word dictionaries, which has been updated quarterly since 1994.

With Allan A. Metcalf, he wrote America in So Many Words: Words that have shaped America (1997). He has worked as a teacher, lecturer, and as an expert witness reporting on usage and meaning in English words.

His collection of political words of the last couple of decades was published in December 2016. The title is Barnhart's Never-finished Political Dictionary of the 21st Century and the publisher is Lexik House Publishers (Hyde Park, New York).

Barnhart is a member and past president of the Dictionary Society of North America and the International Linguistic Association. He is a member of the American Dialect Society.

== Personal life ==
Barnhart is married and has two sons.

== Works ==
- Thorndike-Barnhart dictionary series, co-editor with Clarence Barnhart.
- The Barnhart Dictionary Companion, quarterly journal, with Clarence Barnhart.
- Neo Words: A Dictionary of the Newest and Most Unusual Words of Our Time (1991).
- The Barnhart New-Words Concordance (1994) and its Supplement (2006).
- America in So Many Words: Words that have shaped America (1997) with Allan A. Metcalf.
- Barnhart's Never-finished Political Dictionary of the 21st Century. (December 2016) Lexik House Publishers (Hyde Park, New York)
