= Robert Barnhart =

Robert K. Barnhart (1933 – April 2007) was an American lexicographer and editor of various specialized dictionaries. He was co-editor, with his father Clarence Barnhart, on some editions of the Thorndike-Barnhart dictionaries and The World Book Dictionary. With his father and Sol Steinmetz, he edited the three volumes of The Barnhart Dictionary of New English (1973, 1980, 1990).

He also edited The Hammond Barnhart Dictionary of Science (1986), also published as The American Heritage Dictionary of Science (1988). Perhaps his major work is The Barnhart Dictionary of Etymology (1988), which is marketed under the title Chambers Dictionary of Etymology in the United Kingdom. It is one of the most comprehensive volumes of its kind. He edited an abridgement, The Barnhart Concise Dictionary of Etymology (1995). His Barnhart Abbreviations Dictionary (1995) includes a reverse list of what the abbreviations stand for.

Robert's brother David K. Barnhart is also a lexicographer.
