= Dictionary Society of North America =

Learned society

- Abbreviation: DSNA
- Formation: 1969; 57 years ago
- Type: Academic society
- Headquarters: Collingswood, New Jersey
- President: Lisa Berglund
- Website: The Dictionary Society of North America

The Dictionary Society of North America (DSNA) was founded in 1975 to encourage scholarly and professional activities that have to do with dictionaries and lexicography. Since 1994, DSNA has been a member of the American Council of Learned Societies.

The society, one of the largest professional associations for lexicographers, publishers, collectors, and historians of dictionaries, has more than 400 members and sponsors a biennial conference for the presentation of scholarly papers on aspects of lexicographical history, theory and practice. It also publishes an annual journal of dictionary scholarship, Dictionaries (founded in 1979; accessible online through Project MUSE), and a semiannual newsletter. Copies of the newsletter and tables of contents of the journal are archived at the society's web page (see link below), which also provides news about dictionaries and membership and conference information.

Distinguished former members of the society include Frederic G. Cassidy (1907–2000), editor of the Dictionary of American Regional English, Allen Walker Read (1906–2002), Clarence L. Barnhart (1900-1993), Laurence Urdang (1927–2008), Ladislav Zgusta (1924–2004), Richard W. Bailey (1939–2011), and Madeline Kripke (1943–2020).

From 1995 until 2008, the society made an annual award underwritten by Laurence Urdang, to support promising lexicographical research projects. Two awards for 2009 were conferred in his memory.

Michael Adams has prepared a history of the early years of the society; the first of four installments appeared in volume 35 of Dictionaries (2014), pp. 1–35: "The Dictionary Society of North America: A History of the Early Years (Part I)".
