= Urdang =

Urdang is a surname. Notable people with the surname include:

- Bertha Urdang (1912–2001), British-born Israeli art collector and gallery owner
- Laurence Urdang (1927–2008), American lexicographer, editor, and author
- Leslie Urdang (born 1956), American film producer and theatre executive

== See also ==
- Urdang Academy
