= Verbatim =

Verbatim means word for word. It may refer to:

- Verbatim (album), a 1996 album by Bob Ostertag
- "Verbatim" (song), a 2005 song by Mother Mother
- "Verbatim" (song), a 2015 song by Blackbear
- Verbatim (brand), a brand of storage media and flash memory
- Verbatim (horse), an American racehorse
- Verbatim (magazine), a quarterly literary magazine issued by Stein & Day (1974–1988)
- Verbatim theatre, a form of documentary theatre
