= WordGenius =

Electronic publishing system

WordGenius is a system for publishing dictionaries and reference books electronically, based on eComPress technology from Eurofield Information Systems. The Unabridged and College versions of the Random House Dictionary known as Random House Webster's Unabridged Dictionary, and the Macquarie Dictionary of Australian English have been published using the technology, along with a thesaurus and spell checker for Microsoft Windows.

WordGenius takes special keywords to be able to return multiple possible matches for words. This also applies to definitions.
