= Ladislav Zgusta =

Czech-American linguist (1924–2007)

- Born: March 20, 1924; Libochovice, Czechoslovakia
- Died: April 27, 2007 (aged 83); Champaign, Illinois, U.S.
- Spouse: Olga Zgusta (before 1968)
- Children: 2
- Awards: Guggenheim Fellowships (1977, 1983); Gold Medal of the Czech Academy of Sciences (1992)

Academic background
- Education: University of Brno
- Thesis: Lexicology of the Cypriot Dialect (1949)

Academic work
- Discipline: Lexicology; lexicography; Indo-European linguistics; onomastics
- Institutions: University of Illinois
- Notable works: Manual of Lexicography (1971)

Ladislav Zgusta (March 20, 1924 – April 27, 2007) was a Czech-American historical linguist, lexicologist, and lexicographer, who wrote one of the first textbooks on lexicography. After working as a laborer and a railroad employee in Nazi-occupied Czechoslovakia, Zgusta earned two doctorates from Czech universities. Threatened with detention during the Prague Spring, his family escaped to the United States through India while posing as tourists, with assistance from the American embassy in New Delhi and the support of his colleagues in the United States.

Upon his arrival in the United States in 1970, Zgusta found a great deal of assistance from his contemporaries, who helped launch his career there and landed him in a tenured position after less than four years. He held temporary positions at Cornell University and the University of Texas during his first year in the United States, then moved to the University of Illinois that same year; he remained there until his retirement in 1995. During his career, Zgusta was a founding member of the Dictionary Society of North America, serving as its president from 1983 to 1985.

An accomplished polyglot, Zgusta published articles in at least ten different languages and reviewed publications written in at least eight more. Over the course of sixty years, he published nearly 650 reviews of academic works. He remained a highly decorated academic and member of several national academic societies throughout his career. Following two Guggenheim Fellowships in 1977 and 1983, he was elected a fellow of the American Academy of Arts and Sciences and received the Gold Medal of the Czech Academy of Sciences in 1992.

== Early life and education ==
Ladislav Zgusta was born on March 20, 1924, in Libochovice, Czechoslovakia (modern-day Czech Republic). During the occupation of Czechoslovakia in World War II, he made his living as a laborer, working partially as a temporary worker in construction and partially as a railway worker in the Nazi-occupied Protectorate of Bohemia and Moravia. He learned English by reading pulp fiction; among his favorites was Tarzan of the Apes by Edgar Rice Burroughs. During the early period of his life, he was well-traveled; he spent time throughout the Soviet Union – including Russia and Georgia – East and West Germany, Austria, and the United States. Zgusta traveled to little-known areas of the Caucasus, which he later jokingly titled the "Caucasian extravaganza". In the 1950s, he took part in a linguistic archeological expedition, which identified previously unknown Ossetic inscriptions written in Ancient Greek on steles in the Arkhyz valley of the River Pshish.

Zgusta earned his first doctorate in classical philology and Indology in 1949 from Prague University with a dissertation on the lexicology of the Cypriot dialect of Greek. In 1964, he gained a second doctorate in the philology of Asia Minor with a dissertation on personal names. The same year, he earned his doctoral habilitation in Indo-European linguistics from the University of Brno. In 1965, he gave a notable lecture on laryngeal theory at Yale University. The same year, he was invited on a tour of some American universities, including the University of Illinois, University of California (Berkeley and Los Angeles campuses), the University of Chicago, Columbia University, Harvard University, the University of Pennsylvania, and the University of Texas.

== Escape to the United States ==
Beginning in the winter of 1968, Braj Kachru worked with Zgusta to navigate the Czechoslovak bureaucracy after Robert Lees had invited him to be a visiting professor at the University of Illinois, requesting he teach Hittite grammar and comparative Anatolian linguistics at the institute set up by the Linguistic Society of America. The unstable political situation made the process of extracting Zgusta from the country difficult; Kachru described the process as "immense and intensely ideological" where "even the language of the invitation had to be very carefully chosen" with complicated paperwork and travel plans. Zgusta met with great success at Illinois, leading Kachru and Henry R. Kahane to attempt to find him a more permanent position among the faculty there. They proposed to H. E. Carter, then vice chancellor of the endowment committee, that Zgusta should be nominated to take over the George A. Miller visiting professorship, which had the possibility of leading to a tenured position. Zgusta had powerful support from highly-regarded scholars around the United States: Warren Cowgill at Yale, D. J. Georgacas at the University of North Dakota, Eric Hamp at the University of Chicago, Winfred Lehmann at the University of Texas, Jaan Puhvel at UCLA, Calvert Watkins at Harvard, and John J. Bateman and Kahane at Illinois all provided letters of support for his appointment.

Following the Prague Spring, Zgusta was threatened with detention by the Soviet military, but escaped with his family to India before making their way to the United States in what Hans Hock described as a "veritable cloak-and-dagger episode worthy of a movie". Zgusta prepared to travel through Rome, Cairo, Mumbai, and Delhi – partially by elephant – and arrive in the United States with his wife, Olga, and their two teenage children, Richard and Monika. Gordon Fairbanks, Eric Hamp, and Winfred Lehmann prepared to get them visas. Fairbanks in particular worked with American officials in Washington, D.C., to help facilitate a safe arrival. The Zgustas traveled to Mumbai with a government-sanctioned tourism agency with other Czech tourists in February 1970. From there, they escaped to New Delhi in order to reach the American embassy there. Their time in India was anxiety-ridden, as India's neutrality made it a risky place for defections from communist nations, but they were able to arrive in the United States shortly thereafter "with the help of a friendly embassy" and "an unobtrusive change of their passports". Zgusta later joked about the escape, commenting that a number of typos in his Manual of Lexicography had not been caught because he had to leave Czechoslovakia in a hurry before he could see the final proofs.

== Later career and death ==
During his first year in the United States, Zgusta was affiliated with three universities: Cornell, Texas, and Illinois. In the spring of 1970, he began teaching at Cornell (in Ithaca, New York), and spent the subsequent summer at the Linguistic Research Center at the University of Texas; these appointments were secured with the "help and council" of Fairbanks and Lehmann, the latter of whom was now the chairman of the University of Texas's linguistics department. At the start of the fall semester, Zgusta was placed in a visiting role at the University of Illinois before being accelerated to a tenured position there in 1971. By 1974, he was appointed as a permanent member of the Center for Advanced Study, the university's highest honor for its faculty. In 1992, he was elected as a fellow of the American Academy of Arts and Sciences and received the Gold Medal of the Czech Academy of Sciences for his contributions to the humanities. Zgusta was one of the twenty-five founding members of the Dictionary Society of North America, its vice president from 1981 to 1983 and its president from 1983 to 1985.

In 1976, Zgusta was selected by his peers to be the Hermann and Klara H. Collitz professor of the Linguistic Society of America. The following year – as well as in 1983 – he was made a Guggenheim fellow. He was selected to be the director of the Center for Advanced Studies in 1987. In 1995, Zgusta officially retired from his work at the University of Illinois. He died on April 27, 2007, in Champaign, Illinois.

== Legacy ==
Zgusta wrote one of the first textbooks on lexicography. First published in 1971, his Manual of Lexicography has been described as a touchstone for the field. The book's contents were based largely on Zgusta's experiences in planning and editing a nine-volume Czech–Chinese dictionary, which he managed from 1959 to 1967, and a Chinese–German dictionary he compiled in Berlin from 1964 to 1970.

As a result of his travels and work, Zgusta developed a reputation as an accomplished polyglot; during his lifetime, he reviewed pieces for publication in Armenian, Afrikaans, Dutch, Georgian, Norwegian, Portuguese, Swedish, and Ossetian. It is unknown precisely how many languages he spoke as he was reluctant to discuss it, often simply laughing and gently deflecting the question, but by the time of his death he had amassed some 647 academic reviews spanning sixty years, including hundreds of dictionaries written in at least ten different languages.

He himself published works in his native Czech, as well as in English, German, Latin, French, Hungarian, Italian, Russian, Spanish, and Modern Greek. The Dutch lexicographer Piet van Sterkenburg has referred to Zgusta as "the twentieth-century godfather of lexicography". While most of his linguistic work focused on the Indo-European languages, he also published work on other languages such as Etruscan, Ngizim, Navajo, and the Athabaskan language family. Zgusta was a member of the Italian Linguistic Society, the Austrian Academy of Sciences, and the Society for Indo-European Studies.

Zgusta is often remembered for his sense of humor. Throughout his time as an academic he often gave unflattering nicknames to his students, which were considered high honors. He often referred to his graduate assistants as "slaves" and jokingly requested they make donations to made-up organizations, such as the "Save Russia Fund" or the "Slave Liberation Fund", whenever they broke a rule he had invented. For example, when a student forgot the translation of Polydyras, he teased the student by requesting 27¢ for the "Save Russia Now Fund". He often encouraged students to relax and to steal supplies from the linguistics department. As an academic advisor, he insisted that his students learn to forge his signature and congratulated them on their success in theft. With one of his students, Donna Farina, Zgusta jokingly adopted the middle initials "S. L." meaning Simon Legree, the brutal plantation owner in Uncle Tom's Cabin. When Farina addressed him as such following her graduation, Zgusta responded that it must now stand for "Slave Liberator" and the two used it in their correspondences until his death.

== Selected works ==
- Die Personennamen griechischer Städte der nördlichen Schwarzmeerküste: Die ethnischen Verhältnisse, namentlich das Verhältnis der Skythen und Sarmaten, im Lichte der Namenforschung (Československá akademie ved. Monografie orientálního ústavu 16 ). Prague: Nakladatelstvi československé Akademie Ved 1955.
- Kleinasiatische Personennamen (Československá akademie ved. Monografie orientálního ústavu 19). Prague: Verlag der Tschechoslowakischen Akademie der Wissenschaften 1964
- Anatolische Personennamensippen. Vol. 1: Text. Vol. 2: Beilagen (Dissertationes Orientales 2). Prague: Academia 1964.
- Neue Beiträge zur kleinasiatischen Anthroponymie (Dissertationes orientales 24). Prague: Academia 1970.
- Manual of lexicography (Janua Linguarum. Series maior 39). Prague: Academia / The Hague, Paris: Mouton 1971 (in cooperation with V. Cerny i.a.).
- Kleinasiatische Ortsnamen (Beiträge zur Namenforschung, Beih. 21). Heidelberg: Carl Winter 1984 ISBN 3-533-03513-1.
- The old Ossetic inscription from the river Zelencuk (Veröffentlichungen der Iranischen Kommission = Sitzungsberichte der österreichischen Akademie der Wissenschaften. Philosophisch-historische Klasse 486). Vienna: Verlag der Österreichischen Akademie der Wissenschaften 1987 ISBN 3-7001-0994-6
- Lexicography today: an annotated bibliography of the theory of lexicography (Lexicographica. Series maior 18). Tübingen: Max Niemeyer Verlag 1988 ISBN 3-484-30918-0 (with the assistance of Donna M. T. Cr. Farina).
- History, Languages and Lexicographers (Lexicographica. Series maior 41). Tübingen: Max Niemeyer Verlag 1992 ISBN 3-484-30941-5.
- Lexicography Then and Now. Selected Essays. (Lexicographica. Series maior 129. Edited by Fredric S.F. Dolezal and Thomas B.I. Creamer). Tübingen: Max Niemeyer Verlag 2006. ISBN 978-3-484-39129-1
