= World Book Dictionary =

American English dictionary

The World Book Dictionary
- Editor: Clarence Barnhart
- Subject: General
- Genre: Dictionary
- Publication date: 1963–present

The World Book Dictionary is a two-volume English dictionary published as a supplement to the World Book Encyclopedia. It was originally published in 1963 by Field Enterprises under the editorship of Clarence Barnhart, who wrote definitions for the Thorndike-Barnhart graded dictionary series for children, based on the educational works of Edward Thorndike whom Clarence Barnhart had known and worked with decades before. In some editions it was called the World Book Encyclopedia Dictionary. The writing and editing of special articles were carried out by the staff of the World Book Encyclopedia. Encyclopedia staff also reviewed the work for consistency with the encyclopedia and appropriateness of its users.

Like the encyclopedia, it is designed to be user friendly to young people, yet comprehensive enough to be useful to adults. The definitions are designed with consideration for the age at which a person usually encounters the word. Quotations or sample sentences are offered with many words. Most proper names are excluded, leaving their treatment to the encyclopedia.

The word list is based on a formula for calculating frequency of use. Originally covering about 180,000 words, it was expanded to over 225,000 words with over 3,000 illustrations, making it considerably larger than most dictionaries, though not of "unabridged" scope. Its vocabulary has largely been drawn from the Century Dictionary, the Oxford English Dictionary, and Barnhart's own extensive quotation file begun in the 1940s.

From 1963 the World Book Dictionary was updated annually and received a major revision in 1976. With the decline of traditional lexicography and the death of Clarence Barnhart in 1993, the work appears to have fallen almost into obscurity as a standalone work, having been overshadowed by the World Book Encyclopedia, which also includes the dictionaries as part of the set. The World Book Dictionary was last edited and updated by Robert and Cynthia Barnhart in 1996. Robert Barnhart died in 2007, and Cynthia Barnhart went on to produce the Facts on File Student's Dictionary of American English (2008). David Barnhart continues to edit the Barnhart Dictionary Companion and the Barnhart New-Words Concordance.

== Related work ==
Prior to the World Book Dictionary, Barnhart published the Thorndike-Barnhart range of school dictionaries from which much of the World Book Dictionary was derived. Barnhart and psychologist Edward Thorndike co-created the Thorndike-Century Junior Dictionary in 1935 followed by the Thorndike-Century Senior Dictionary in 1941. Thorndike died shortly thereafter, and Barnhart continued the work, retaining Thorndike's name in the titles. Eventually these became a series of three student dictionaries: Junior, Intermediate, and Advanced. The dictionaries were popular in American schools from the 1950s through to the 1980s. They were published by Scott Foresman Publishing in Chicago, USA and updated every 3 years or so. In 1997 Scott Foresman was bought out by Pearson plc and merged into their publishing company Addison-Wesley. Upon the formation of Pearson Education in 1998 the company retired the work in favour of their own Longman dictionary range.
