= Charles Annandale =

Scottish editor (1843–1915)

Charles Annandale (1843–1915) was a Scottish editor, primarily of reference books.

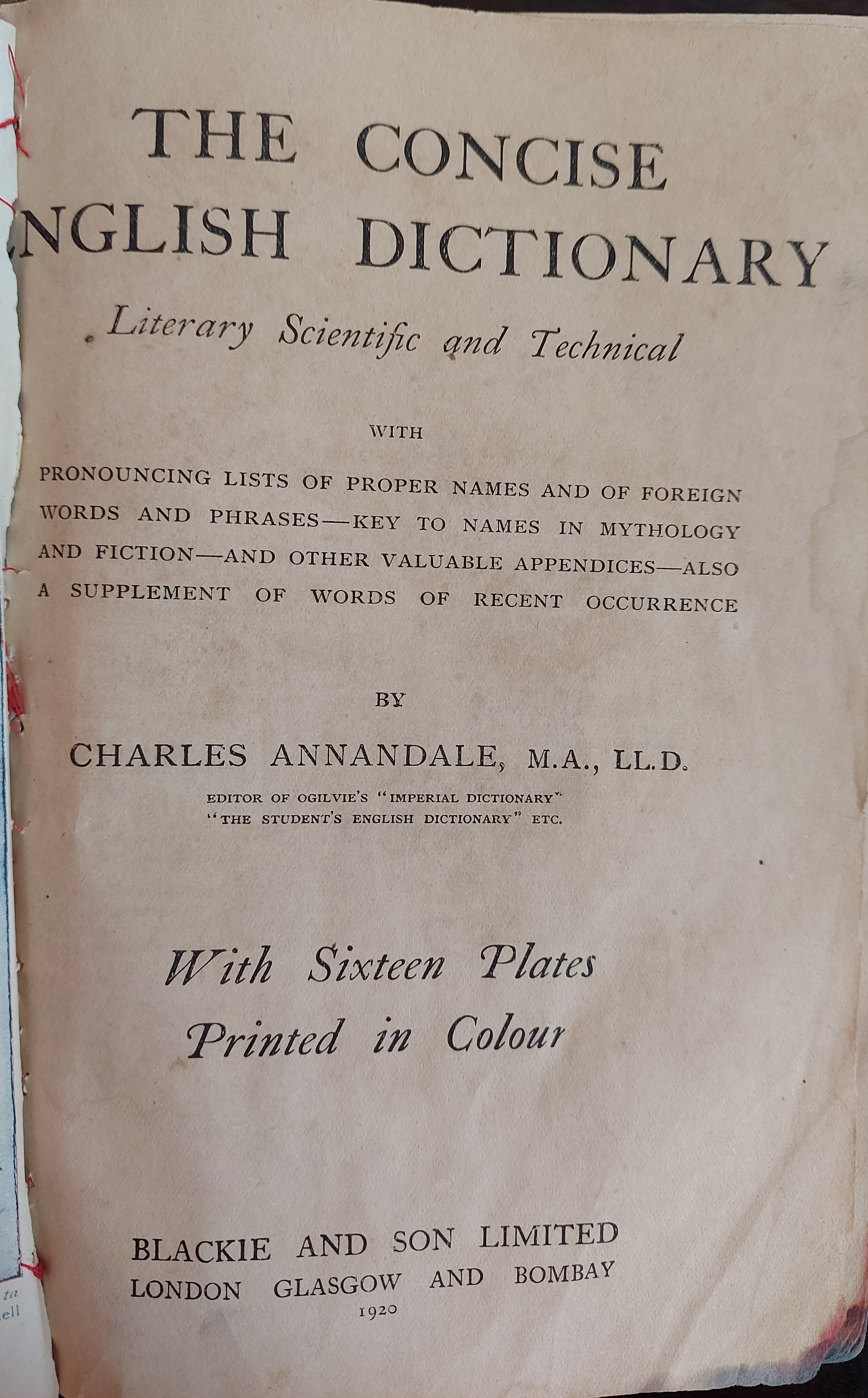

== Life ==
He was born at Fordoun on 26 August 1843, the son of James Annandale. He graduated M.A. from the University of Aberdeen in 1867, and later received an honorary degree there in 1885. received his M.A. in 1867 and LL.D. in 1885

He edited the revision of John Ogilvie's Imperial Dictionary of the English Language and several abridgements, including The Student's English Dictionary and The Concise English Dictionary. Other works he edited include The Modern Cyclopedia of Universal Information, The Popular Encyclopedia, The Works of Robert Burns, and The New Gresham Dictionary of the English Language.
