= World Book Encyclopedia =

American encyclopedia

- Language: American English
- Series: 22 volumes
- Subject: General
- Genre: Reference encyclopedia
- Publisher: Scott Fetzer Company, a subsidiary of Berkshire Hathaway
- Publication date: August 31, 1917; 109 years ago
- Publication place: United States
- Media type: Publication
- Dewey Decimal: 031.21
- LC Class: AE5 .W55
- Website: worldbook.com

The World Book Encyclopedia is an American encyclopedia. World Book was first published in 1917. Since 1925, a new edition of the encyclopedia has been published annually. Although published online in digital form for a number of years, World Book is currently the only American encyclopedia which also still provides a print edition. The encyclopedia is designed to cover major areas of knowledge uniformly, but it shows particular strength in scientific, technical, historical and medical subjects.

World Book, Inc. is based in Chicago, Illinois. According to the company, the latest edition, World Book Encyclopedia 2024, contains more than 14,000 pages distributed along 22 volumes and also contains over 25,000 photographs.

World Book also publishes children's non-fiction and picture books under the Bright Connections Media imprint, and educational development and supplemental instructional resources through Incentive Publications by World Book.

== History ==
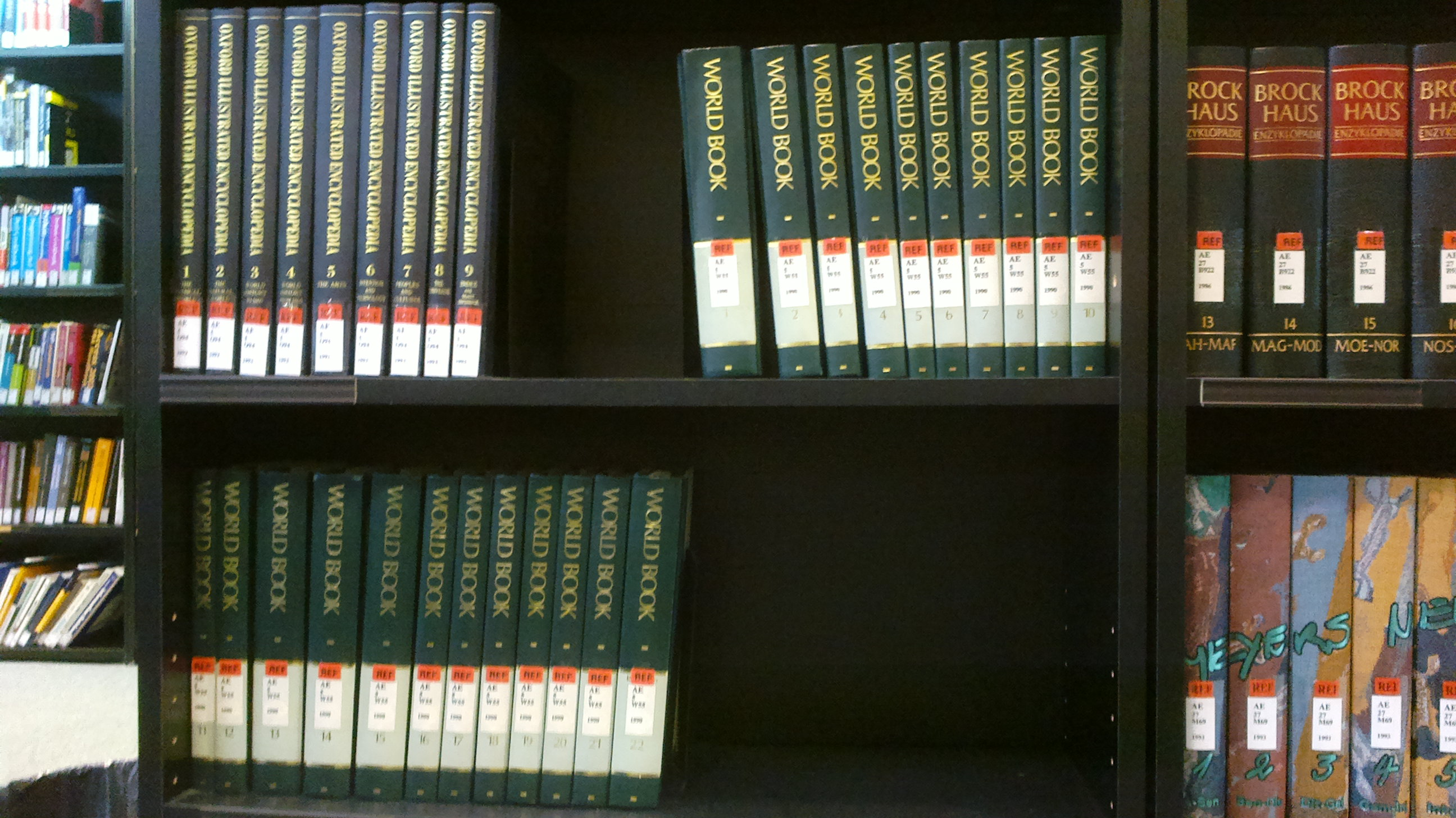
World Book Encyclopedia (1990)

World Book was founded in Chicago by publishers J. H. Hansen and John Bellow, who realized that existing encyclopedias were off-putting to readers. In 1915, they enlisted the help of Michael Vincent O'Shea, a professor of education at the University of Wisconsin.

The first edition of The World Book Encyclopedia was published (as simply The World Book) in 1917, by the Hanson-Roach-Fowler Company. "As a rule," wrote O'Shea, the founding editor, in the preface of that 1st edition, "encyclopedias are apt to be quite formal and technical. A faithful effort has been made in the World Book to avoid this common defect." The encyclopedia's name would later be shortened to its current name World Book.

In 1919, World Book became the property of W.F. Quarrie & Company. The new owners created an editorial board to help make sure the entries were aligned with what students studied, from kindergarten to high school.

In 1933, World Book exhibited at the Century of Progress Exposition in Chicago.

In 1945, World Book became the property of Field Enterprises.

In 1952, World Book moved its office into the Merchandise Mart in Chicago.

In 1962, World Book published its first hardcover edition of Year Book, replacing the previous paperback yearbooks that go as far back as the 1920s.

In 1963, the World Book Dictionary based on the works of Clarence Barnhart, was published as a companion to the encyclopedia.

In 1977, staff members of World Book visited President Jimmy Carter in the White House.

In 1978, World Book was purchased by Scott Fetzer Company, an Ohio conglomerate that left the encyclopedia company in Chicago. That year, the company had a sales force of 60,000 and vastly outsold Encyclopædia Britannica.

In 1985, the Scott Fetzer Company was purchased by Berkshire Hathaway. In the late 1980s, while the World Book sales force had declined, it still had 45,000 door-to-door representatives. For the year 1990, Berkshire Hathaway reported that the business of producing the encyclopedia had generated profits of $32 million. But as sales plunged in the 1990s, World Book's results were no longer broken out in Berkshire Hathaway financial reports.

In 2009, Funk & Wagnalls was acquired by World Book Encyclopedia; the company's Funk & Wagnalls New Encyclopedia had ceased publication in 1997. Starting in the 2000s, the popularity of World Book declined, which caused the company to focus on its digital content and sales to academic institutions alongside children's trade publications.

As of 2022, the only official sales outlet for the World Book Encyclopedia is the company's website; the official list price is $1,199. A company representative said in 2018 that "thousands" of print sets are still ordered annually, mostly by schools who use them as teaching tools for library research skills; public libraries and homeschooling families are also frequent purchasers.

== Production ==
The first edition of World Book (1917) contained eight volumes. New editions have since appeared every year except 1920, 1924, and 1932, with major revisions in 1929 (13 volumes), 1947 (19 volumes), 1960 (20 volumes), 1971 (22 volumes), and 1988 (new typeface and page design, and some 10,000 new editorial features). In 1972, a Research Guide and Index were added to World Book. In 2000, World Book published its Millennium Edition.

Unlike the way most other encyclopedias were printed, World Book has traditionally been published in variously sized volumes, depending on the letter of the alphabet. Although most volumes cover exactly one letter completely, the letters with exceptionally numerous entries ("C" and "S") are divided between two volumes, while adjacent letters with relatively few entries ("J"–"K", "N"–"O", "Q"–"R", "U"–"V", and "W"–"Z") share a volume.

World Book editors lay out major articles distinctly, often starting them on a page of their own, perhaps with a two-column heading. Materials are reviewed and authored by experts. They recognize that one of the primary uses of general-purpose encyclopedias is students' work on school reports. For instance, every article for a U.S. state has a box giving information about such things as the official state bird and tree; each President of the United States gets a very distinctive look with an oversized portrait, a timeline and significant historical events that occurred during that president's administration.

== Alternative editions ==
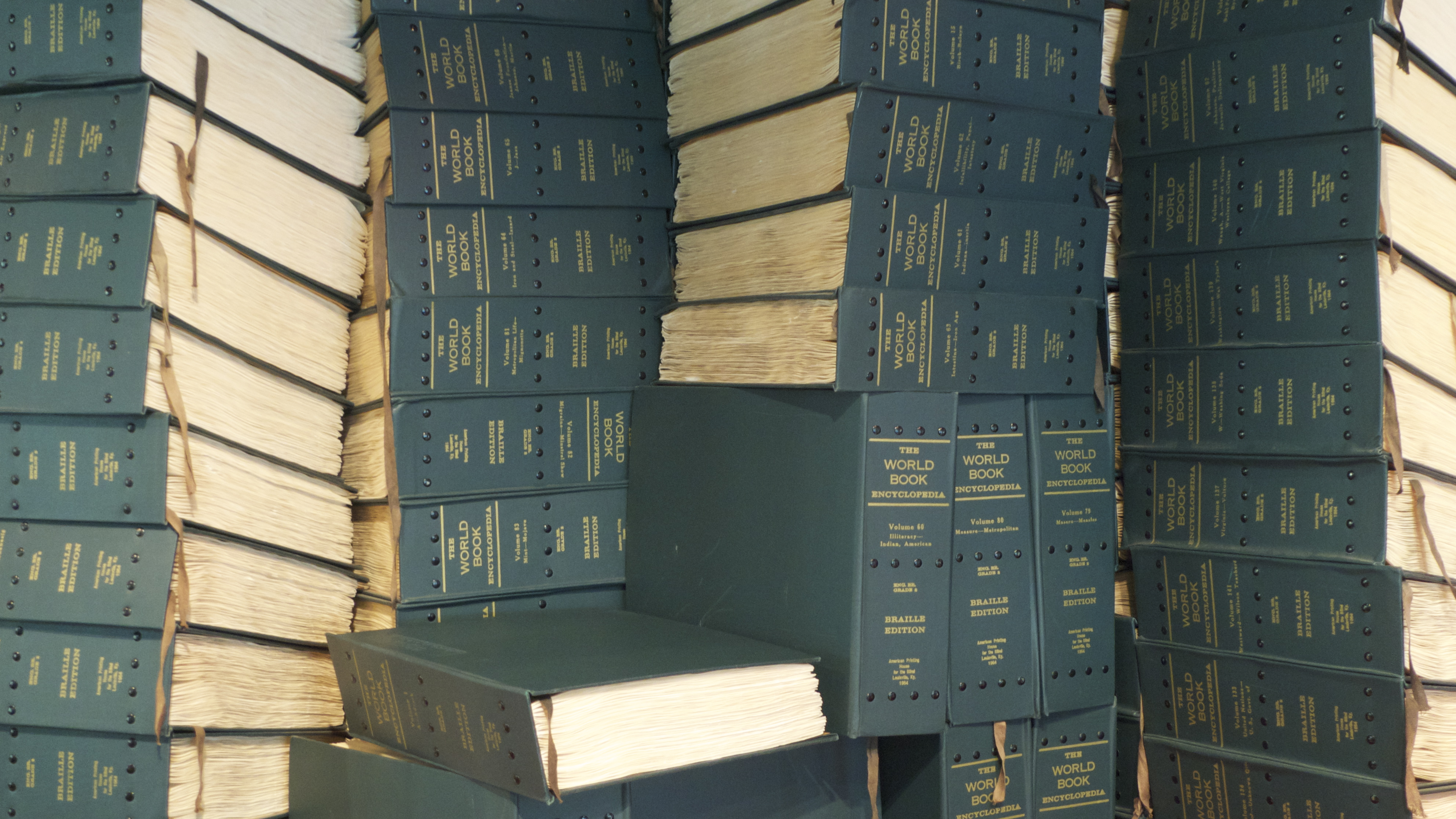
Braille 1959 World Book Encyclopedia

In 1937, World Book published its first international edition.

In 1962, World Book produced a braille edition, which filled 145 volumes and nearly 40,000 pages. It was the first encyclopedia in braille. The project was mainly an effort in goodwill, for the company did not see its way clear to selling enough copies of the set to cover production costs. Eventually, all sets of the braille edition were donated to several institutions for the blind. In 1964, the company also published a large-print edition.

In 1990, World Book first became available electronically through text-only CD-ROMs. In 1995, the World Book Multimedia Information Finder CD-ROMs were released, which include more than 150,000 index entries, 1,700 tables, 60,000 cross references, 17,000 articles, and 225,000 dictionary entries with hyperlinks to more than 5,000 pictures and 260 maps. The Multimedia Information Finder also features animations, videos, and a graphical timeline.

In 1998, World Book launched its first website. Subsequently, World Book released several digital products while continuing to publish its print edition. The online version includes 23 subscription databases with all of the articles contained in the print set, as well as several thousand additional articles and the contents of every yearbook World Book has published since 1922. Articles are also available in the Spanish language. The online version contains links to current web sites and magazine articles, a news section, and video samples.

In 2008, World Book Student was launched for students and teachers online.

== Digital multimedia encyclopedia ==
World Book Encyclopedia was also published in electronic form for Microsoft Windows and Apple's Mac OS X. Electronic editions contained the entire text of the 22-volume World Book Encyclopedia, plus illustrations, video clips, 3D panoramic views, and sounds. The articles bring together a complete story, multimedia content, an article outline, research aids and links to related information. Online updates to articles and a "Month in Brief" time browser are available by subscription.

In 2002, Apple included a bundled copy of the Mac OS X Edition of World Book Encyclopedia when they made OS X the default operating system for all new computers. This edition had some Mac-only features, including a more intuitive user interface, Sticky Notes sharing via Bonjour technology, a Trivia Challenge game, a collection of editor-approved webcams, Notepad, speech capabilities and "This Day in History", "Media Showcase" and "Librarian" widgets.

Since November 2007, both the Windows and Mac electronic editions of World Book Encyclopedia have been developed and published by Software MacKiev.

== Associated publishing projects ==
Other World Book products include:

- World Book eBooks
- World Book Online
- World Book Reading Club
- World Book Student
- World Book WOW
- A Look At ...
- Anti-Bullying Basics
- Building Blocks of Mathematics
- Building Blocks of Science
- Childcraft
- Dinosaurs!
- Discovery Science
- Early World of Learning
- Endangered Animals
- Enigmas of History
- Out of This World (Book series for ages 10–14+, profiling NASA inventors and their concepts.)
- World Book Year Book (covers previous year's events/history and features updated articles from the encyclopedia)
- World Book's Animals of the World

== See also ==
- Encyclopædia Britannica
- List of online encyclopedias
- Te Ara: The Encyclopedia of New Zealand
