= Benjamin Eli Smith =

American lexicographer

Benjamin Eli Smith, L.H.D. (February 7, 1857 – March 18, 1913) was an American editor and the son of Eli Smith. Born in Beirut, Ottoman Empire (now Beirut, Lebanon), he graduated from Amherst College (A.B., 1877; A.M., 1881), earning the degree of L.H.D. in 1902. He was managing editor of the first edition of the Century Dictionary, and editor-in-chief of the revised edition after the death of editor William Dwight Whitney in 1894. As the editor, he was also responsible for the Century Cyclopedia of Names (1894), the Century Atlas (1897), the two-volume Century Dictionary Supplement (1909), and the revised and enlarged Century Dictionary, Cyclopedia, and Atlas (twelve volumes, 1911). He translated Schwegler's History of Philosophy and Cicero's De Amicitia, as well as edited selections from other works.
