= Berta R. Barnhart =

American socialite

Berta M. Roybar Barnhart (born April 1, 1880) was an American socialite. She was a member of the Seattle City Planning Commission.

== Early life ==
Barnhart was born in Ackley, Iowa, on April 1, 1880.

== Career ==
Barnhart was active in club affairs. For seven years she had been a church organist.

Barnhart was a member of City Planning Commission.

Barnhart was the president of the City Federation of Women's Clubs.

Barnhart was a member of the Coterie Club and of the Women's City Club.

== Personal life ==
Barnhart moved to Washington in 1910 and lived at 5722 East Green Lake Way, Seattle, Washington. On April 4, 1906, she married Walter Ernest Barnhart (1877-1931), a city and county attorney elected on Republican ticket, and had three children.
