= Verbatim (magazine) =

Verbatim – The Language Quarterly
- Frequency: Quarterly
- Founder: Laurence Urdang
- Founded: 1974
- Company: Word, Inc.
- Country: United States
- Based in: Chicago
- Language: English
- Website: www.verbatimmag.com
- ISSN: 0162-0932

Verbatim: The Language Quarterly was a literary magazine aimed at reporting language and linguistic issues for non-specialist readers. It was established in 1974. These matters are announced in the magazine's advertised slogan: "Language and linguistics for the layperson since 1974". The founding editor was Laurence Urdang and the final editor was Erin McKean. Verbatim was administered from Chicago, with a British office in Chearsley, Buckinghamshire. Until the end of the 1980s, it was distributed in the United States and Canada by the independent publisher Stein & Day.

== Bibliography ==
- "Stein & Day Publishing Files for Bankruptcy", New York Times, June 27, 1987
- "Stein & Day To Shut Down", New York Times, July 29, 1988
