= John Ogilvie (lexicographer) =

Scottish lexicographer (1797–1867)

John Ogilvie (/ˈoʊɡəlvi/; 17 April 1797 – 21 November 1867) was a Scottish lexicographer who edited the Imperial Dictionary of the English Language.

== Life ==
He was born 17 April 1797 in Marnoch, Banffshire (now in Aberdeenshire), the son of William Ogilvie, farmer, and Ann Leslie, daughter of a farmer in a neighbouring parish.

After receiving some elementary education at home, and attending the parish school for two quarters, Ogilvie worked as a ploughman until he was twenty-one. In 1818, after an accident, one of his legs had to be amputated above the knee. Afterwards Ogilvie taught successively in two subscription schools, in the parishes of Fordyce and Gamrie, both in Banffshire. With the help of a local schoolmaster, he prepared for university, and in October 1824 he entered Marischal College, Aberdeen. Adding to his income by private tuition, he graduated M.A. on 14 April 1828.

He remained in Aberdeen as a tutor until 13 May 1831, when he was appointed mathematical master in Gordon's Hospital, an educational establishment in the city. Marischal College conferred on him the honorary degree of LL.D. on 15 January 1848. He retained his mastership until July 1859.

Ogilvie died of typhoid fever at Aberdeen on 21 November 1867.

== Works ==
To the Aberdeen Magazine 1831–2, Ogilvie contributed, under the signature 'Iota,’ ten 'Imitations of Horace' in Scottish dialect. In 1836 he worked for Blackie & Son's annotated edition of Thomas Stackhouse's History of the Bible. Messrs. Blackie engaged him in 1838 to revise and enlarge Webster's; he compiled the Imperial Dictionary (published 1847–1850) using Noah Webster's American Dictionary as its basis, expanding it greatly. The result appeared as the Imperial Dictionary, English, Technical, and Scientific, issued in parts from 1847 onwards, and published complete in 1850, and supplement 1855.

In 1863 Ogilvie issued an abridgment of the 'Dictionary,’ under the title 'Comprehensive English Dictionary, Explanatory, Pronouncing, and Etymological,’ the pronunciation being supervised by Richard Cull. In 1865 appeared the 'Students' English Dictionary, Etymological, Pronouncing, and Explanatory,’ in which etymology and definitions received special attention. A feature of all three dictionaries was their engravings, the 'Imperial' claiming to be the first after Nathaniel Bailey's to use pictorial illustrations. Ogilvie's last work was a condensation of the 'Students' Dictionary,’ entitled 'English Dictionary, Etymological, Pronouncing, and Explanatory, for the use of Schools,’ 1867. At his death he was revising the 'Imperial Dictionary,’ which was reissued in 1882–3, under the editorship of Charles Annandale.

== Family ==
On 15 November 1842 Ogilvie married Susan Smart, daughter of a farmer near Stonehaven, Kincardineshire. She predeceased him on 20 May 1853, leaving two daughters and a son.

== Notes ==
Attribution This article incorporates text from a publication now in the public domain: Bayne, Thomas Wilson (1895). "Ogilvie, John (1797–1867)". In Lee, Sidney (ed.). Dictionary of National Biography. Vol. 42. London: Smith, Elder & Co.
