= The Imperial Dictionary of the English Language =

The Imperial Dictionary of the English Language: A Complete Encyclopedic Lexicon, Literary, Scientific, and Technological, edited by Rev. John Ogilvie (1797–1867), was an expansion of the 1841 second edition of Noah Webster's American Dictionary. It was published by W. G. Blackie and Co. of Scotland, 1847–1850 in two large volumes.

With the addition of a third supplement volume in 1855, Ogilvie increased Webster's 70,000 word coverage to over 100,000. He included words from science, technology, and the arts; much British usage omitted by Webster; an unusual number of provincial and Scottish words; and added quotations and encyclopedic information for many words. With over 2,000 woodcut illustrations, it was the first significantly illustrated dictionary, setting the trend which continues today.

A revised and expanded edition by Charles Annandale was published in 1882 at London in four volumes, over 3,000 pages, with about 130,000 entries, revised definitions and etymologies, and 3,000 illustrations. Although the vocabulary coverage was small by today's standards, it was the largest English dictionary at the time. This edition went through numerous printings in various forms well into the twentieth century.

The Century Company of New York acquired rights to publish Annandale's Imperial in the US. Due to disputes with the G. & C. Merriam Company, publisher of Webster's American Dictionary, the American edition of the Imperial, published in 1883, contained a copyright notice stating:

Certain owners of American copyrights having claimed that undue use of matter so protected has been made in the compilation of the Imperial Dictionary, notice is hereby given that arrangement has been made with the proprietors of such copyright matter for the sale of this work in this country. The Century Co. May 1st, 1883.

The Century Company used the Imperial as the basis for the much larger American work, The Century Dictionary and Cyclopedia, published 1889–1891. The copyrights for the Century were later sold to Random House, and the Century became the basis of modern Random House dictionaries.

An adaptation of the Imperial by George W. Ogilvie, called Webster's Imperial Dictionary, was published in 1904, versions and revisions of which have been issued under various titles, including Webster's Universal Dictionary and Webster's Twentieth Century Dictionary.
