= Sol Steinmetz =

American linguist

- Born: July 29, 1930; Budapest, Hungary
- Died: October 13, 2010 (aged 80); Manhattan, New York, USA
- Education: Yeshiva University (BA); Rabbi Isaac Elchanan Theological Seminary (semikhah)
- Occupations: linguist; lexicographer; writer; rabbi

Sol Steinmetz (July 29, 1930 – October 13, 2010) was a Hungarian American linguistics and lexicography expert who wrote extensively about etymologies, definitions and uncovered earliest recorded usages of words in English and Yiddish. A widely sought source on all things lexical, he earned recognition from William Safire in his On Language column in The New York Times Magazine in 2006 as a "lexical supermaven".

== Biography ==
Steinmetz was born in Budapest on July 29, 1930, and emigrated to the United Statesfrom Hungary before the outbreak of World War II, with brief intervals spent in the Dominican Republic and Venezuela. He earned his undergraduate degree from Yeshiva University with a major in English and received his semikhah (rabbinic ordination) from YU's Rabbi Isaac Elchanan Theological Seminary (RIETS). Steinmetz studied linguistics at Columbia University under Yiddish scholar Uriel Weinreich while working as a congregational hazzan. Steinmetz ultimately did not finish his graduate studies and left Columbia to become the rabbi of a synagogue in Media, Pennsylvania.

He worked for publishers Merriam-Webster and Clarence Barnhart before moving to Random House, where he oversaw Random House Webster's College Dictionary as the executive editor of the firm's dictionary division. As part of his lexicographical research, he found such first uses as the sense of the metonymous use of the word "suit" to mean a bureaucrat which he found attributed to a 1982 episode of Cagney and Lacey.

His work was sought out by reporters and writers and was widely cited in William Safire's On Language column in The New York Times Magazine, where he was credited as being a member of "Olbom" (On Language's Board of Octogenarian Mentors), despite his age. His writings include works on Yiddish such as the 1986 book Yiddish and English: A Century of Yiddish in America and the 2002 work Meshuggenary: Celebrating the World of Yiddish, which he wrote with Charles M. Levine and Payson R. Stevens. Books aimed at the general market include the 2008 release of Semantic Antics: How and Why Words Change Meaning, a book that Safire called his "favorite popular word book of the year", noting the derivations that Steinmetz provided for the words "cartel" and "nude". His final book was There's a Word for It: The Explosion of the American Language Since 1900, published by Harmony Books in the year he died.

A resident of New Rochelle, New York, died in Manhattan at the age of 80 on October 13, 2010, due to pneumonia. He was survived by his wife, Tzipora Mandel, whom he married in 1955, as well as three sons, 12 grandchildren and two great-grandchildren. Jesse Sheidlower of the Oxford English Dictionary credited Steinmetz as someone who "never had a bad word to say about anyone", despite the fact that "he knew a lot of bad words".
