= The American College Dictionary =

- The 1947 edition of The American College Dictionary.
- Subject: Reference
- Published: 1947
- Publisher: Random House
- Publication place: United States

The American College Dictionary was the first Random House dictionary and was later expanded to create the Random House Dictionary of the English Language. First published in 1947, The American College Dictionary was edited by Clarence Barnhart based on the 1927 New Century Dictionary.

== History ==
The Random House publishing company entered the reference book market after World War II. They acquired the rights to the Century Dictionary and the Dictionary of American English, both out of print.

=== Development ===
Many scholars participated in the development of the dictionary with over 300 specialists assisting. For medical and psychological in the dictionary, many physicians in the New York City area where Random House was headquartered gave their assistance. In 1947, the dictionary was published, being edited by Clarence Barnhart and was based primarily on The New Century Dictionary, an abridgement of the Century. It was originally sold for $5.00 and included 1432 pages.

=== Later adaptations ===
In the late 1950s, it was decided to publish an expansion of the American College Dictionary, which had been modestly updated with each reprinting since its publication. Under editors Jess Stein and Laurence Urdang, they augmented the American College Dictionary with large numbers of entries in all fields, primarily proper names, and published it in 1966 as The Random House Dictionary of the English Language: The Unabridged Edition. It was the first dictionary to use computers in its compilation and typesetting.

== Commentary ==
When the American College Dictionary was first published, The Journal of the American Medical Association called it "more modern than any other similar book" and that the dictionary had included "considerable information not available in other dictionaries, such as rules for punctuation, proofreader's marks and notes on footnotes and bibliography".

American writer, broadcaster, and logophile Charles Harrington Elster described the 1947 edition of the American College Dictionary as a "landmark" among dictionaries.
