= Random House Webster's Unabridged Dictionary =

American dictionary

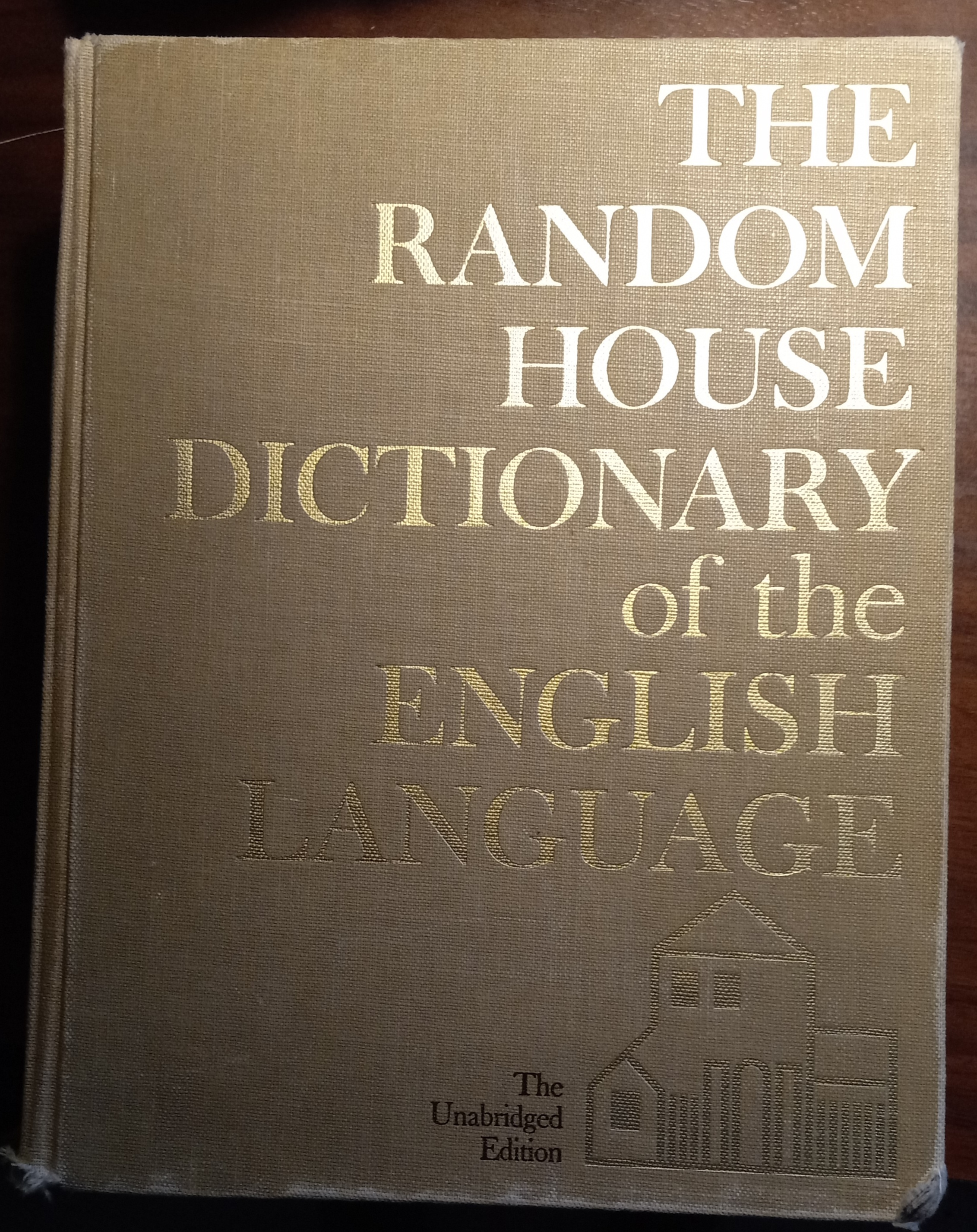

Random House Webster's Unabridged Dictionary is a large American dictionary, first published in 1966 as The Random House Dictionary of the English Language: The Unabridged Edition. Edited by Jess Stein, it contained 315,000 entries in 2256 pages, as well as 2400 illustrations. The CD-ROM version in 1994 also included 120,000 spoken pronunciations.

== History ==
The Random House publishing company entered the reference book market after World War II. They acquired rights to the Century Dictionary and the Dictionary of American English, both out of print. Their first dictionary was The American College Dictionary, published in 1947, edited by Clarence Barnhart and based primarily on The New Century Dictionary, itself an abridgment of the Century.

In the late 1950s, it published an expansion of the American College Dictionary, which had been modestly updated with each reprinting since its publication. Under editors Jess Stein and Laurence Urdang, they augmented the American College Dictionary with large numbers of entries in all fields, primarily proper names, and published it in 1966 as The Random House Dictionary of the English Language: The Unabridged Edition. It was the first dictionary to use computers in its compilation and typesetting. The dataset for compiling the dictionary contained a 25,000,000-word corpus.

In his preface to the 1966 edition, Stein wrote (p. vi) that the Random House Dictionary steers "a linguistically sound middle course" between the "lexicographer's Scylla and Charybdis: should the dictionary be an authoritarian guide to 'correct' English or should it be so antiseptically free of comment that it may defeat the user by providing him with no guidance at all?" In 1982 Random House published The Random House ProofReader, a computer spell checker based on its dictionary.

An expanded second edition of the printed dictionary, edited by Stuart Berg Flexner, appeared in 1987, revised in 1993. This edition adopted the Merriam-Webster Collegiate Dictionary's practice of adding dates for the entry of words into the language. Unlike the Collegiate, which cited the date of the first known citation, Random House indicated a range of dates. For example, where the Collegiate gave 1676, Random House might offer 1670–80. This second edition was described as permissive by T. R. Reid in the Washington Post.

Random House incorporated the name Webster's into the dictionary's title after an appeals court overturned an injunction awarded to Merriam-Webster restricting the name's use. In 2001, Random House published the Random House Webster's Unabridged Dictionary of the English Language.

Dictionary.com's online dictionary bases its proprietary content on the Random House unabridged version.

== See also ==
- WordGenius
