= Century Dictionary =

English language encyclopedic dictionary by William Dwight Whitney

The Century Dictionary and Cyclopedia
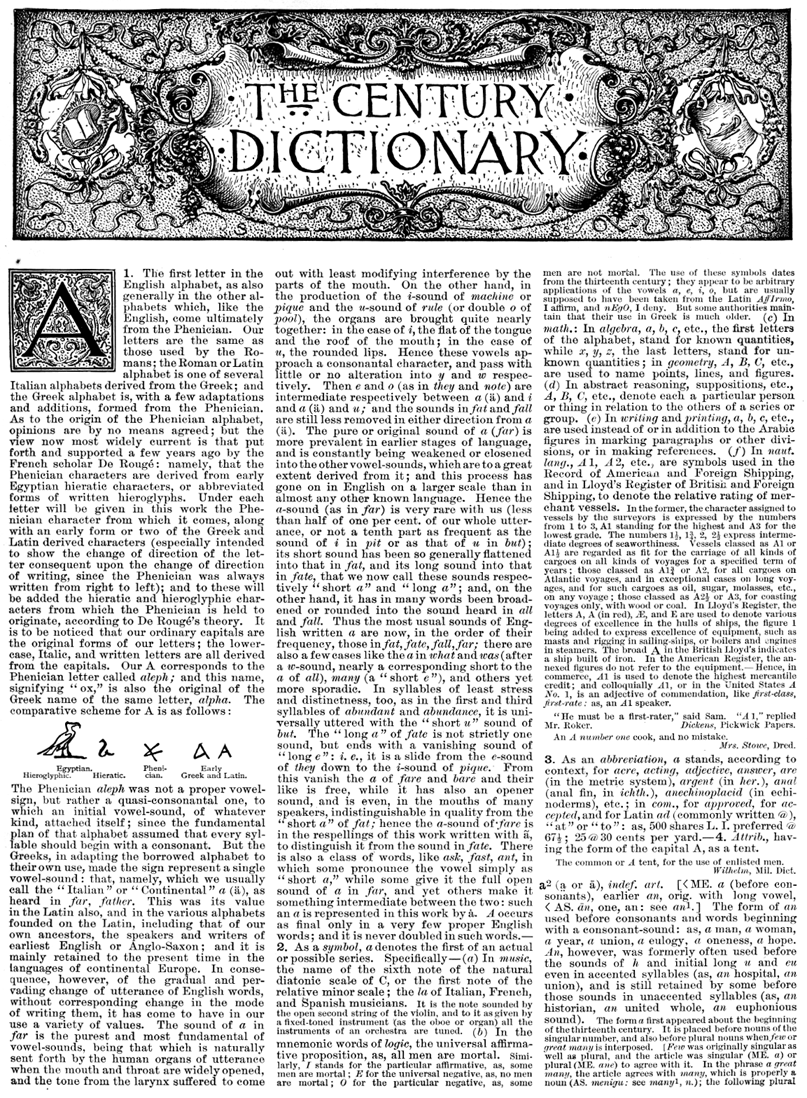
- First alphabetical page of the 1911 edition
- Edited by: William Dwight Whitney; Benjamin Eli Smith
- Country: United States
- Language: English
- Publisher: The Century Company
- Published: 1889–1891 (first edition, volumes 1–6); 1895 (volumes 1–10); 1906 (volumes 1–12)
- No. of books: 12
- Followed by: The New Century Dictionary

The Century Dictionary and Cyclopedia, published between 1889 and 1906, is one of the largest encyclopedic dictionaries of the English language. It was compared favorably with the Oxford English Dictionary, and frequently consulted for more factual information than would normally be the case for a dictionary.

== History ==
The Century Dictionary is based on The Imperial Dictionary of the English Language, edited by Rev. John Ogilvie (1797–1867) and published by W. G. Blackie and Co. of Scotland, 1847–1850, which in turn is an expansion of the 1841 second edition of Noah Webster's An American Dictionary of the English Language. In 1882 The Century Company of New York bought the American rights to The Imperial Dictionary from Blackie and Son.

The first edition of the Century Dictionary was published from 1889 to 1891 by The Century Company, and was described as "six volumes in twenty four". The first edition runs to 7,046 pages and features some 10,000 wood-engraved illustrations. It was edited by Sanskrit scholar and linguist William Dwight Whitney, with Benjamin Eli Smith's assistance.

Meredith Publishing Company's 1963 edition of The New Century Dictionary. Volume One: A–pocket veto and Volume Two: pock-mark–zymurgy & Supplements

In 1895 a 10-volume edition was published, with the first eight volumes containing the dictionary proper, and the last two containing a biographical dictionary and a world atlas. Editions in either the 10- or 8-volume format were published in 1899, 1901, 1902, 1903 and 1904. In 1901 the title and subtitle changed slightly from The Century Dictionary; an encyclopedic lexicon of the English language to The Century Dictionary and Cyclopedia; a work of universal reference in all departments of knowledge, with a new atlas of the world. Further editions were published in 1906, 1909 and 1911, this time in 12 volumes each.

After Whitney's death in 1894, supplementary volumes were published under Smith's supervision, including The Century Cyclopedia of Names (1894) and The Century Atlas (1897). A two-volume Supplement of new vocabulary, published in 1909, completed the dictionary. A reformatted edition, The Century Dictionary and Cyclopedia, was published in 1911 in twelve quarto volumes: ten of vocabulary, plus the volume of names and the atlas. This set went through several printings, the last in 1914. The same year, the entire book, excluding the Cyclopedia of Names and the Century Atlas, was reprinted and bound together as one enormous volume, consisting of roughly 8,500 pages on India paper. The now much coveted edition with the same paper also appeared around this time, usually in five double volumes (rarely, in 10 single volumes) plus one additional for the Cyclopedia.

The completed dictionary contained over 500,000 entries, more than Webster's New International or Funk and Wagnalls New Standard, the largest other dictionaries of the period. Each form of a word was treated separately, and liberal numbers of quotations and additional information were included to support the definitions. In its etymologies, Greek words were not transliterated.

Although no revised edition of the dictionary was ever again published, an abridged edition with new words and other features, The New Century Dictionary (edited by H.G. Emery and K.G. Brewster; revision editor, Catherine B. Avery,) was published by Appleton-Century-Crofts of New York in 1927, and reprinted in various forms for over thirty-five years. The New Century became the basis for the American College Dictionary, the first Random House Dictionary, in 1947. The three-volume New Century Cyclopedia of Names, an expansion of the 1894 volume, was published in 1954, edited by Clarence Barnhart.

The Century Dictionary was admired for the quality of its entries, the craftsmanship in its design, typography, and binding, and its excellent illustrations. It has been used as an information source for the makers of many later dictionaries, including editors of the Oxford English Dictionary, who cited it over 2,000 times in the first edition. In 1913, a Ph.D. dissertation on "American Dictionaries" concluded its 14-page chapter on the Century Dictionary with the assessment that the work "far surpasses anything in American lexicography".

== Typography and typesetting ==
The Century Dictionary was typeset and printed by Theodore Low De Vinne, who gave it a typographic aesthetic that foreshadowed a norm of 20th century book printing. Prefigured in De Vinne's work on the Century Magazine from its origins as Scribner's Monthly in 1870, the printer eschewed the thin hairlines and reduced legibility of the "modern" serif typefaces that were predominantly used in the mid-eighteen-hundreds, favouring Caslon as a sturdier and more legible "old style" face instead. Due to the complexity of typesetting a large dictionary, De Vinne also devised an elaborate composition stand that gave compositors access to more than seven hundred boxes of type and special sorts within easy reach.

== Digitization efforts ==
The works are out of copyright, and efforts have been made to digitize the volumes.

=== 24-part set ===
1889–91

Volume	Part	Coverage	Digitized editions
Vol 1.	1	A – appetence	1889–91
	2	appetence – bice	1889–91
	3	bice – carboy	1889–91
	4	carboy – Conocephalitidæ	1889–91
Vol 2.	5	Conocephalus – deflect	1889–91, 1889–91
	6	deflect – drool	1889–91
	7	droop – expirant	1889–91
	8	expirant – fz	1889–91
Vol 3.	9	G – halve	1889–91, 1889–91, 1889–91
	10	halve – Iguvine	1889–91, 1889–91
	11	ihleite – Juno	1889–91
	12	Juno – lyverey	1889–91
Vol 4.	13	M – Mormon	1889–91, 1889–91, 1889–91
	14	Mormon – optic	1889–91
	15	optic – pilar	1889–91
	16	pilar – pyx-veil	1889–91
Vol 5.	17	Q – ring	1889–91
	18	ring – sea-gull	1889–91
	19	sea-gull – smash	1889–91
	20	smash – stroyl	1889–91
Vol 6.	21	strub – term	1889–91 1889–91
	22	term – trust	1889–91
	23	trust – vysar	1889–91
	24	W – Z	1889–91

=== Ten-volume set ===
Volume	Coverage	Editions digitized	Notes
Vol 1	A. B. Celt	1895, 1897, 1901, 1904, 1906	
Vol 2	Celt. – Drool	1895, 1897, 1901, 1901, 1904, 1904, 1906	
Vol 3	Droop. E. F. G.	1895, 1897, 1897, 1904	
Vol 4	H. I. J. K. L.	1895, 1897, 1901, 1901, 1904, 1904	
Vol 5	M. N. O. Phar.	1895, 1897, 1901, 1904	
Vol 6	Phar. Q. R. Salse.	1895, 1897, 1901, 1901, 1904	
Vol 7	Salsi. – Tech.	1895, 1897, 1901, 1901, 1904, 1904	
Vol 8	Tech. U. V. W. X. Y. Z	1895, 1897, 1901, 1901, 1904	
Vol 9	Proper Names	1897, 1904 Separately: 1894, 1895 (Vol 1), 1895 (Vol 1), 1895 (Vol 2), 1914, 1918, 1954 (New Century, Vol 1 of 3)	
Vol 10	Atlas	1897, 1901	
Vol 11	Dictionary Supplement A–L	1909, 1910, 1910, 1910	
Vol 12	Dictionary Supplement M–Z	1910	

=== Twelve-volume set ===
- 1911, National Library of Medicine
- 1911, University of Michigan and Cornell University (missing volumes)

== Sources ==
- Adams, James Truslow. Dictionary of American History. New York: Scribner, 1940.
- Bailey, Richard W. (1996). "Origins". Dictionaries: Journal of the Dictionary Society of North America. 17 (1): 1–16. doi:10.1353/dic.1996.0014. ISSN 2160-5076.
- Metcalf, Allan (1996). "Typography". Dictionaries: Journal of the Dictionary Society of North America. 17 (1): 17–28. doi:10.1353/dic.1996.0018. ISSN 2160-5076.
- Liberman, Anatoly (1996). "Etymology". Dictionaries: Journal of the Dictionary Society of North America. 17 (1): 29–54. doi:10.1353/dic.1996.0000. ISSN 2160-5076.
- Gilman, E. W. (1996). "Definitions and Usage". Dictionaries: Journal of the Dictionary Society of North America. 17 (1): 55–67. doi:10.1353/dic.1996.0003. ISSN 2160-5076. S2CID 178894798.
- Lance, Donald M. (1996). "Pronunciation". Dictionaries: Journal of the Dictionary Society of North America. 17 (1): 68–78. doi:10.1353/dic.1996.0006. ISSN 2160-5076.
- Hancher, Michael (1996). "Illustrations". Dictionaries: Journal of the Dictionary Society of North America. 17 (1): 79–115. doi:10.1353/dic.1996.0009. ISSN 2160-5076.
- Barnhart, Robert K. (1996). "Aftermath". Dictionaries: Journal of the Dictionary Society of North America. 17 (1): 116–125. doi:10.1353/dic.1996.0012. ISSN 2160-5076.
- Steger, Stewart Archer (1913). "VI. The Century Dictionary". American dictionaries (Ph.D. University of Virginia). Baltimore: J.H. Furst. pp. 83–91.
- Tichenor, Irene (2005). No Art Without Craft: The Life of Theodore Low De Vinne, Printer. Boston: David R. Godine. ISBN 978-1-56792-286-8.
