= Webster's Dictionary =

Dictionary developed by Noah Webster and other dictionaries using his name

Webster's Dictionary is any of the American English dictionaries edited in the early 19th century by American lexicographer Noah Webster (1758–1843), as well as numerous related or unrelated dictionaries that have adopted Webster's name in his honor. "Webster's" has since become a genericized trademark in the United States for American English dictionaries, and is widely used in dictionary titles.

Merriam-Webster is the corporate heir to Noah Webster's original works, which are in the public domain.

== Noah Webster's dictionaries ==
=== A Compendious Dictionary of the English Language (1806) ===
Noah Webster, the author of the readers' and spelling books that dominated the American market at the time, spent decades of research in compiling his dictionaries. His first dictionary, A Compendious Dictionary of the English Language, appeared in 1806. In it, he popularized features which would become a hallmark of American English spelling (center rather than centre, honor rather than honour, program rather than programme, etc.) and included technical terms from the arts and sciences rather than confining his dictionary to literary words. Webster was a proponent of English spelling reform for reasons both philological and nationalistic. In A Companion to the American Revolution (2008), John Algeo notes: "it is often assumed that characteristically American spellings were invented by Noah Webster. He was very influential in popularizing certain spellings in America, but he did not originate them. Rather [. . .] he chose already existing options such as center, color and check on such grounds as simplicity, analogy or etymology." In William Shakespeare's First Folio, for example, spellings such as center and color are the most common. He spent the next two decades working to expand his dictionary.

=== An American Dictionary of the English Language ===
==== First edition (1828) ====
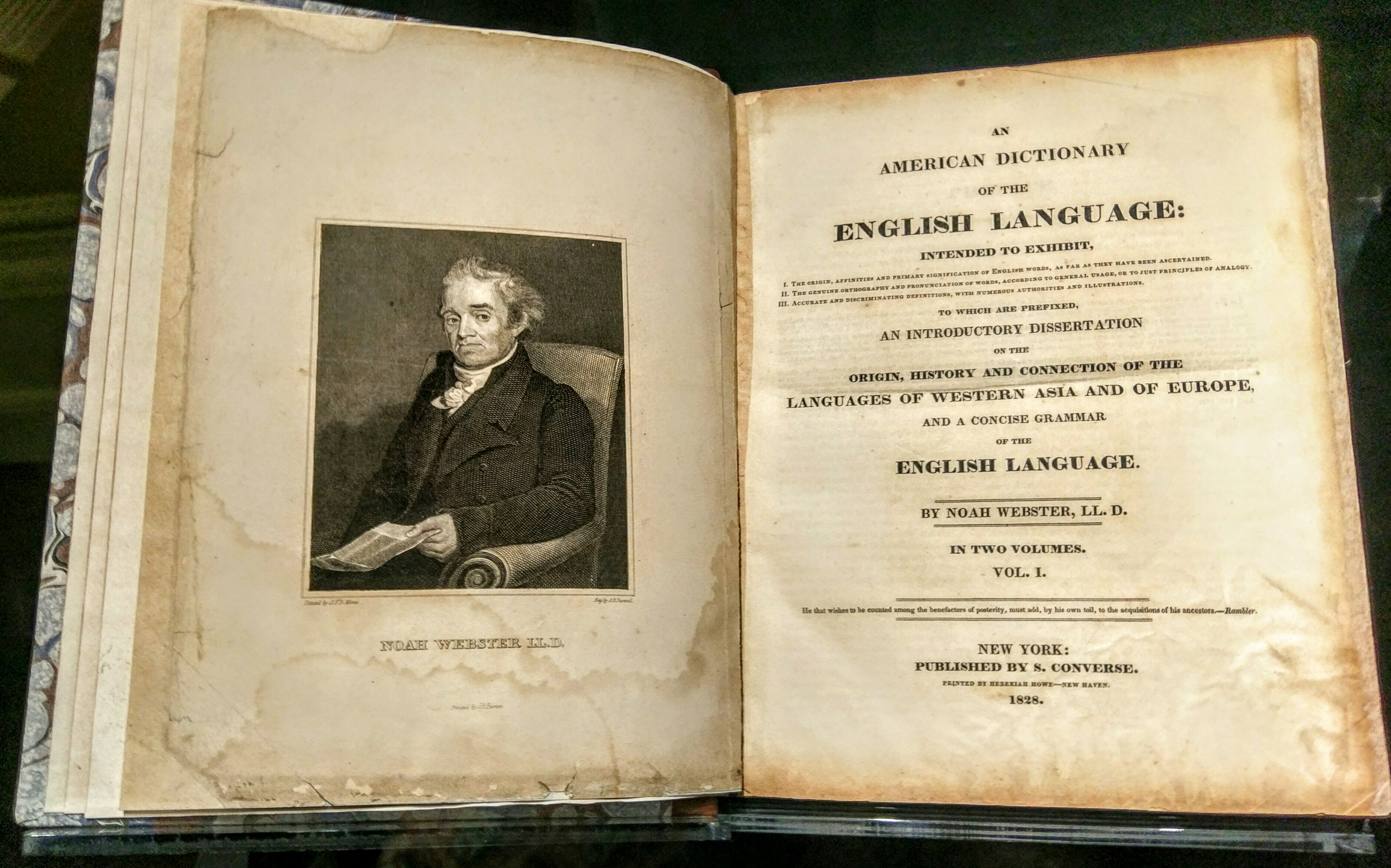
Title page of the 1828 first edition of An American Dictionary of the English Language featuring an engraving of Noah Webster

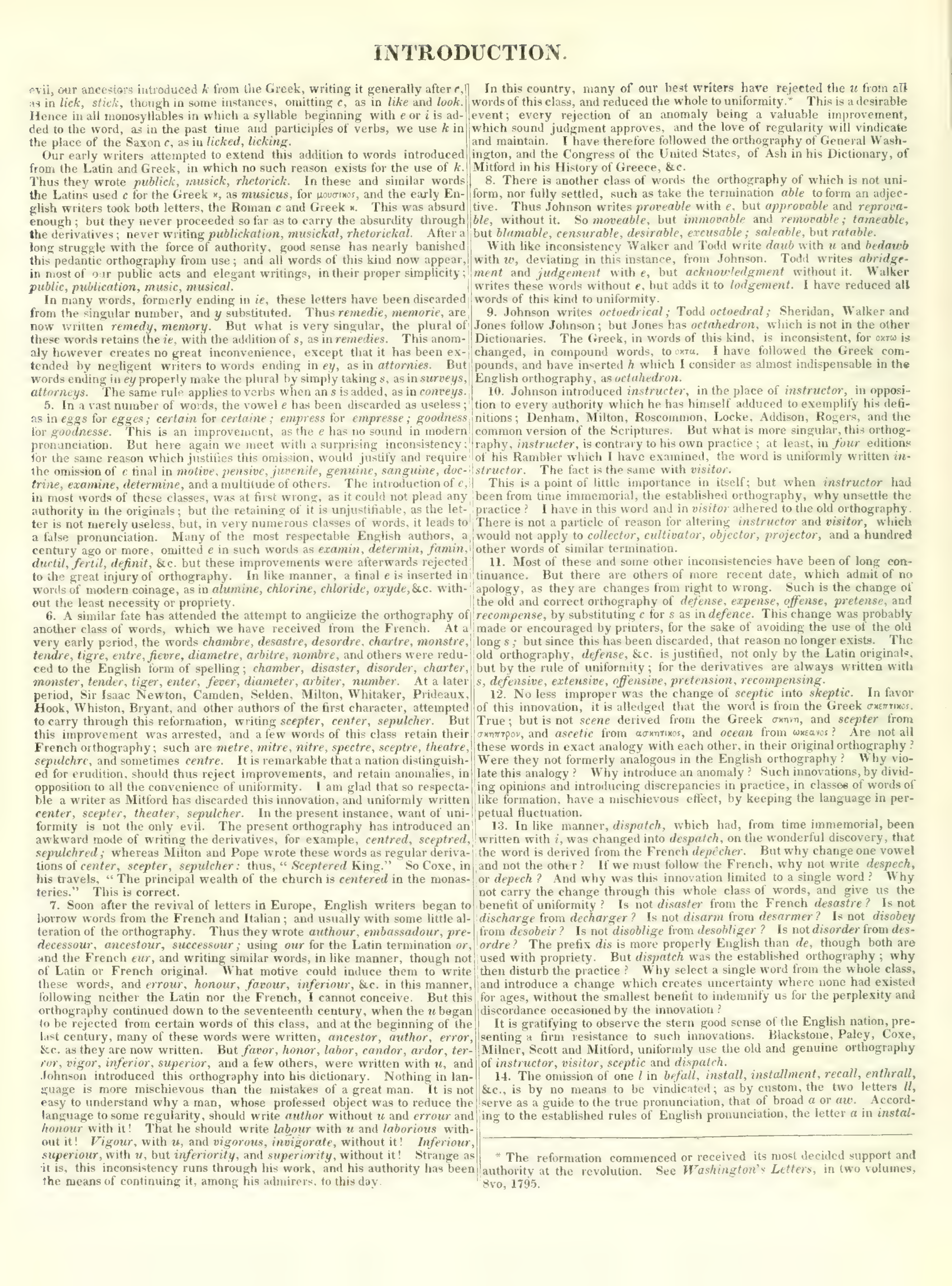
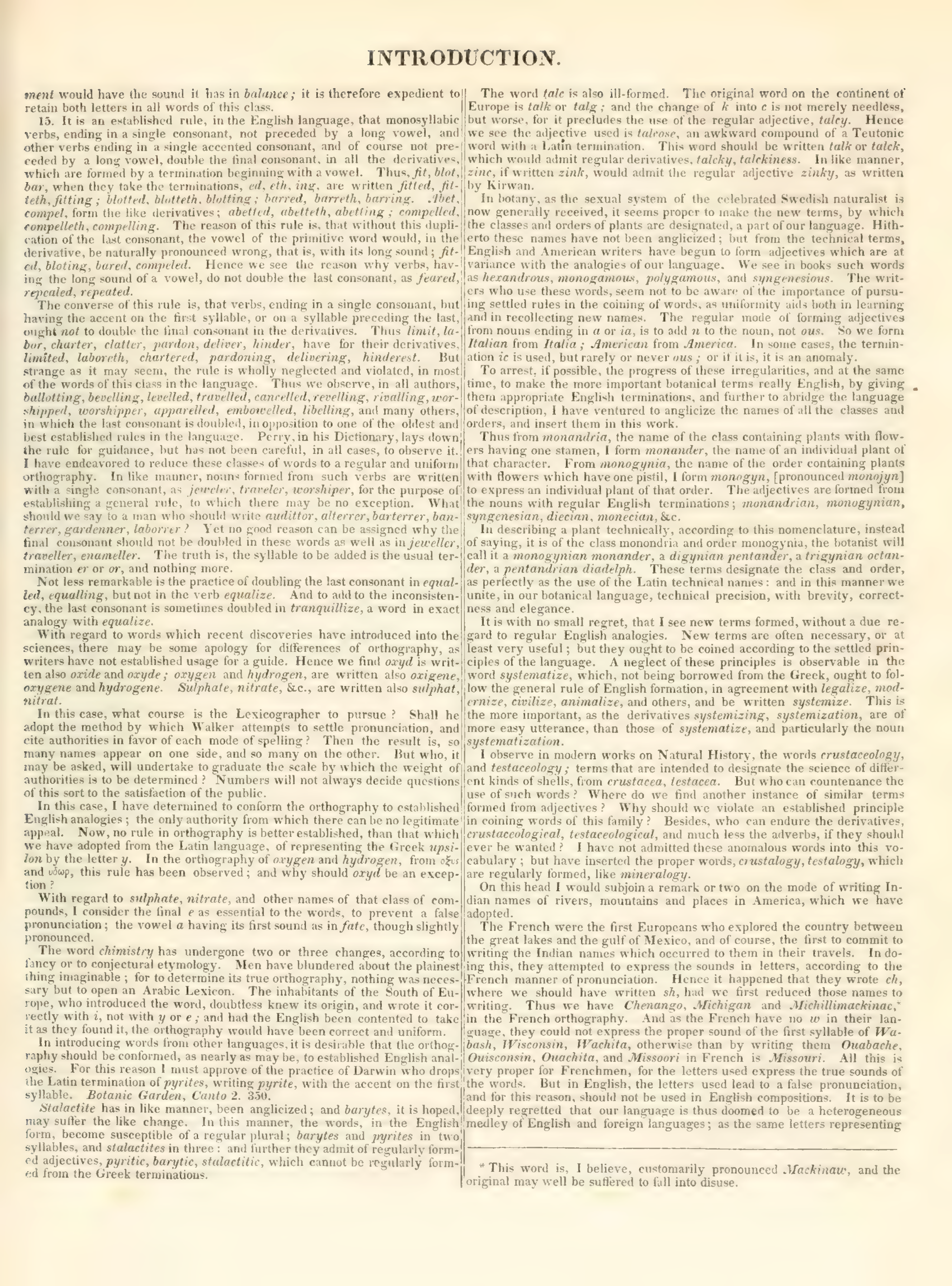
Extract from the orthography section of the first edition, which popularized the American standard spellings of -er (6); -or (7); dropped -e (8); -se (11); doubling consonants with suffix (15)

In 1828, when Noah Webster was 70, he published An American Dictionary of the English Language, printed by S. Converse in two quarto volumes containing 70,000 entries, far greater than the 58,000 of the largest previous dictionary. There were 2,500 copies printed, at $20 (equivalent to $586 in 2025) for the two volumes. At first the set sold poorly. When he lowered the price to $15 (equivalent to $440 in 2025), its sales improved, and by 1836 that edition was exhausted. "Not all copies were bound at the same time; the book also appeared in publisher's boards; other original bindings of a later date are not unknown."

==== Second edition (1841) ====
In 1841, 82-year-old Noah Webster published a second edition of his lexicographical masterpiece with the help of his son, William G. Webster. Its title page does not claim the status of second edition, merely noting that this new edition was the "first edition in octavo" in contrast to the quarto format of the first edition of 1828. Again in two volumes, the title page proclaimed that the Dictionary contained "the whole vocabulary of the quarto, with corrections, improvements and several thousand additional words: to which is prefixed an introductory dissertation on the origin, history and connection of the languages of western Asia and Europe, with an explanation of the principles on which languages are formed. B. L. Hamlen of New Haven, Connecticut, prepared the 1841 printing of the second edition.

When Webster died in 1843, his heirs sold unbound sheets of the 1841 revision to the firm of J. S. & C. Adams of Amherst, Massachusetts. This firm bound and published a small number of copies in 1844. It was one of these copies that Emily Dickinson used as a tool for her poetic composition. However, a $15 (equivalent to $518 in 2025) price tag on the book made it too expensive to sell easily, so Adams decided to sell the rights. G & C Merriam Co. of Springfield, Massachusetts acquired rights from Adams, and contracted with Webster's heirs for sole rights.

The third printing of the second edition in 1845 was the first Webster's Dictionary with a Merriam imprint.

=== Influence ===
Lepore (2008) demonstrates Webster's innovative ideas about language and politics and shows why Webster's endeavors were at first so poorly received. Culturally conservative Federalists denounced the work as radical – too inclusive in its lexicon and even bordering on vulgar. Meanwhile, Webster's old foes, the Jeffersonian Republicans, attacked the man, labeling him mad for such an undertaking.

Scholars have long seen Webster's 1844 dictionary to be an important resource for reading poet Emily Dickinson's life and work; she once commented that the "Lexicon" was her "only companion" for years. One biographer said, "The dictionary was no mere reference book to her; she read it as a priest his breviary – over and over, page by page, with utter absorption.";

Austin (2005) explores the intersection of lexicographical and poetic practices in American literature, and attempts to map out a "lexical poetics" using Webster's dictionaries. He shows the ways in which American poetry has inherited Webster and drawn upon his lexicography to reinvent it. Austin explicates key definitions from both the Compendious (1806), and American (1828) dictionaries and brings into its discourse a range of concerns including the politics of American English, the question of national identity and culture in the early moments of American independence, and the poetics of citation and of definition.

Webster's dictionaries were a redefinition of Americanism within the context of an emergent and unstable American socio-political and cultural identity. Webster's identification of his project as a "federal language" shows his competing impulses towards regularity and innovation in historical terms. Perhaps the contradictions of Webster's project represented a part of a larger dialectical play between liberty and order within Revolutionary and post-Revolutionary political debates.

== Successor dictionaries ==
=== 1847 and 1859 editions ===
G & C Merriam Co. hired Webster's son-in-law Chauncey A. Goodrich, a professor at Yale, to oversee revisions. Goodrich's New and Revised Edition was published in 1847, and a Revised and Enlarged edition in 1859, which added a section of illustrations indexed to the text. His revisions remained close to Webster's work, but removed what later editors referred to as his "excrescences".

=== Unabridged edition (1864) ===
In response to Joseph Emerson Worcester's dictionary of 1860, Merriam commissioned a significantly revised edition, A Dictionary of the English Language. It was edited by Yale University professor Noah Porter and published in 1864, containing 114,000 entries. It was the first edition to largely overhaul Noah Webster's work, and the first to be known as the Unabridged.

Later printings included additional material: a "Supplement Of Additional Words And Definitions" containing more than 4,600 new words and definitions in 1879, A Pronouncing Biographical Dictionary containing more than 9,700 names of noteworthy persons in 1879, and a Pronouncing Gazetteer in 1884. The 1883 printing of the book contained 1,928 pages and was 8½ in (22 cm) wide by 11½ in (29 cm) tall by 4¼ in (11 cm) thick. The 1888 revision is similarly sized. This dictionary carries the 1864 Preface by Noah Porter with postscripts of 1879 and 1884.

James A.H. Murray, the editor of the first edition of the Oxford English Dictionary (1879–1928) says the unabridged edition of 1864 "acquired an international fame. It was held to be superior to every other dictionary and taken as the leading authority on the meaning of words, not only in America and England, but also throughout the Far East."

=== Webster's International Dictionary (1890) ===
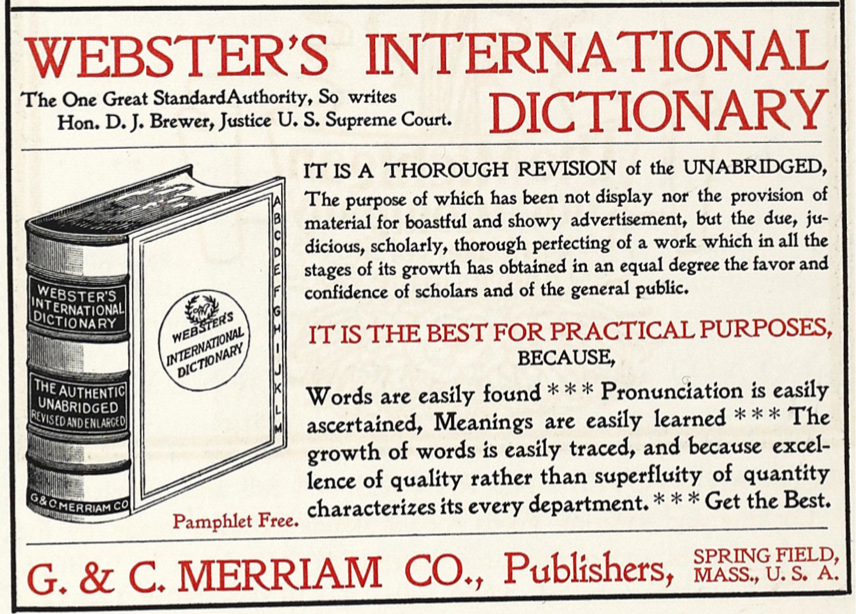
1896 advertisement for the 1890 International edition

Porter also edited the succeeding edition, Webster's International Dictionary of the English Language, published in 1890. It contains about 175,000 entries. In 1900, Webster's International was republished with a supplement that added 25,000 entries to it. Being in the public domain and having been scanned and OCRd in 1996, this edition has had substantial influence on Wiktionary.

=== Webster's New International Dictionary (1909) ===
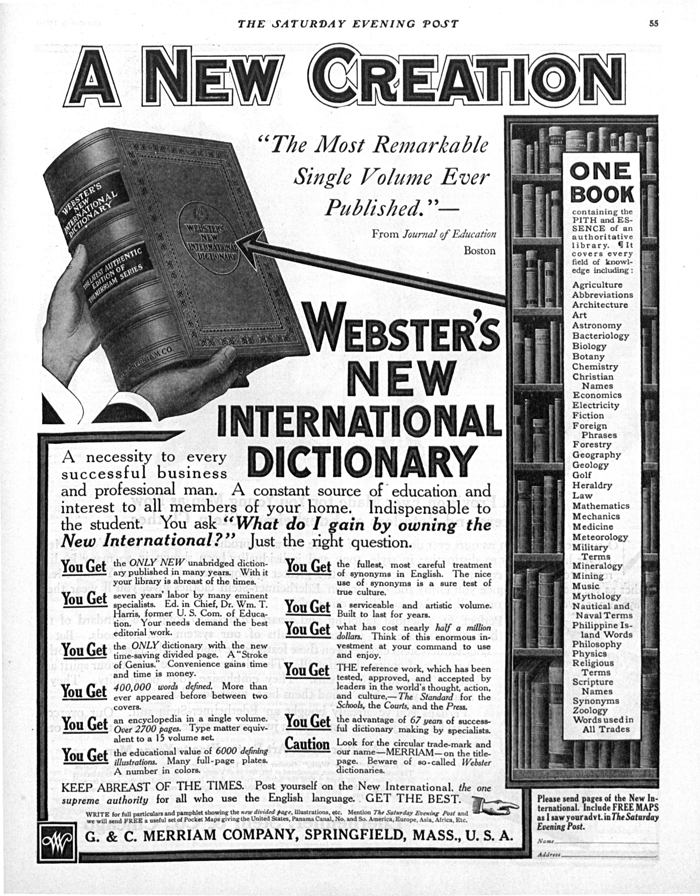
Advertisement for the New International Dictionary from the October 8, 1910, issue of The Saturday Evening Post

Merriam issued a complete revision in 1909, Webster's New International Dictionary, edited by William Torrey Harris and F. Sturges Allen. Vastly expanded, it covered more than 400,000 entries, and double the number of illustrations. A new format feature, the divided page, was designed to save space by including a section of words below the line at the bottom of each page: six columns of very fine print, devoted to such items as rarely used, obsolete, and foreign words, abbreviations, and variant spellings. Notable improvement was made in the treatment and number of discriminated synonyms, comparisons of subtle shades of meaning. Also added was a twenty-page chart comparing the Webster's pronunciations with those offered by six other major dictionaries.

=== Webster's New International Dictionary second edition (1934) ===
In 1934, the New International Dictionary was revised and expanded for a second edition, which is popularly known as Webster's Second or W2. It was edited by William Allan Neilson and Thomas A. Knott. It contained 3,350 pages and sold for $39.50 (equivalent to $951 in 2025). Some versions added a 400-page supplement called A Reference History of the World, which provided chronologies "from earliest times to the present". The editors claimed more than 600,000 entries, more than any other dictionary at that time, but that number included many proper names and newly added lists of undefined "combination words". Multiple definitions of words are listed in chronological order, with the oldest, and often obsolete, usages listed first. For example, the first definition of starve includes dying of exposure to the elements as well as from lack of food.

The numerous picture plates added to the book's appeal and usefulness, particularly when pertaining to things found in nature. Conversely, the plate showing the coins of the world's important nations quickly proved to be ephemeral. Numerous gold coins from various important countries were included, including American eagles, at a time when it had recently become illegal for Americans to own them, and when most other countries had withdrawn gold from active circulation as well.

Early printings of this dictionary contained the erroneous ghost word dord.

Because of its style and word coverage, Webster's Second is still a popular dictionary. For example, in the case of Miller Brewing Co. v. G. Heileman Brewing Co., Inc., 561 F.2d 75 (7th Cir. 1977) – a trademark dispute in which the terms "lite" and "light" were held to be generic for light beer and therefore available for use by anyone – the U.S. Court of Appeals for the Seventh Circuit, after considering a definition from Webster's Third New International Dictionary, wrote that "[T]he comparable definition in the previous, and for many the classic, edition of the same dictionary is as follows:..."

=== Webster's Third New International Dictionary (1961) ===
After about a decade of preparation, G. & C. Merriam issued the entirely new Webster's Third New International Dictionary of the English Language, Unabridged (commonly known as Webster's Third, or W3) in September 1961.

The dictionary was met with considerable criticism for its descriptive (rather than prescriptive) approach. The dictionary's treatment of "ain't" was subject to particular scorn, since it seemed to overrule the near-unanimous denunciation of that word by English teachers.

==== Revisions and updates ====
Since the 1961 publication of the Third, Merriam-Webster has reprinted the main text of the dictionary with only minor corrections. To add new words, they created an Addenda Section in 1966, which was expanded in 1971, 1976, 1981, 1986, 1993, and 2002. However, the rate of additions was much slower than it had been throughout the previous hundred years.

Following the purchase of Merriam-Webster by Encyclopædia Britannica, Inc. in 1964, a three-volume version was issued for many years as a supplement to the encyclopedia. At the end of volume three, this edition included the Britannica World Language Dictionary, 474 pages of translations between English and French, German, Italian, Spanish, Swedish, and Yiddish.

A CD-ROM version of the complete text, incorporating thousands of additional new words and definitions from the addenda, was published by Merriam-Webster in 2000, and was packaged with the print edition. The third edition was republished in 2000 as a subscription-based website.

=== Merriam-Webster Unabridged (2013) ===
Planning for a fourth edition of the Unabridged began with a 1988 memo from then-Merriam-Webster president William Llewellyn, but was repeatedly deferred in favor of updates to the more lucrative Collegiate Dictionary. Work on a full revision finally began in 2009.

In January 2013, the Third New International subscription website was rebranded as Merriam-Webster Unabridged with the first release of 4,800 new and revised entries added to the site. There were two further releases in 2014. The revised website is not branded as the "Fourth edition" and it is unlikely that a print version will ever be produced, because demand is declining and its increased size would make it unwieldy and expensive.

== Merriam-Webster's Collegiate Dictionary ==
Merriam-Webster's eleventh edition of the Collegiate Dictionary

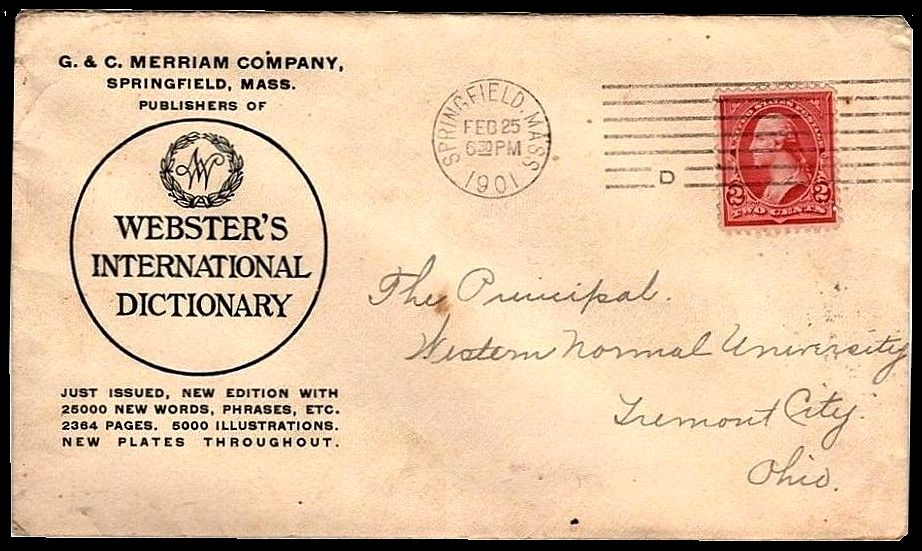
Merriam-Webster company stationery, Massachusetts, 1901

Merriam-Webster introduced its Collegiate Dictionary in 1898. Following the publication of Webster's International in 1890, two Collegiate editions were issued as abridgments of each of their Unabridged editions.

The dictionary is preferred as a source "for general matters of spelling" by The Chicago Manual of Style, which is followed by many book publishers and magazines in the United States. The Chicago Manual states that it "normally opts for" the first spelling listed.

In addition to its Collegiate editions, G. & C. Merriam Co. also produced abridged editions for students (Primary School, Elementary School, Secondary School, High School, Common School, Academic) as well as for the general public (Condensed, Practical, Handy). The first edition of the abridged Primary School dictionary was prepared by Noah Webster in 1833 and later revised by William G. Webster and William A. Wheeler.

With the ninth edition (Webster's Ninth New Collegiate Dictionary, published in 1983), the Collegiate adopted changes which distinguish it as a separate entity rather than merely an abridgment of the "Third New International". Some proper names were returned to the word list, including names of Knights of the Round Table. The most notable change was the inclusion of the date of the first known citation of each word, to document its entry into the English language. The eleventh edition (published in 2003) includes more than 225,000 definitions, and more than 165,000 entries. As of 2025, the series is now on its twelfth edition.

=== Editions ===
Below is a list of years of publication of the Collegiate dictionaries.

- 1st: 1898
- 2nd: 1910
- 3rd: 1916
- 4th: 1931
- 5th: 1936
- 6th: 1949
- 7th: 1963
- 8th: 1973
- 9th: 1983
- 10th: 1993
- 11th: 2003
- 12th: 2025

== The name Webster used by others ==
Since the late 19th century, dictionaries bearing the name Webster's have been published by companies other than Merriam-Webster. Some of these were unauthorized reprints of Noah Webster's work; some were revisions of his work. One such revision was Webster's Imperial Dictionary, based on John Ogilvie's The Imperial Dictionary of the English Language, itself an expansion of Noah Webster's American Dictionary.

Following legal action by Merriam, successive U.S. courts ruled by 1908 that "Webster's" became a generic term when the Unabridged entered the public domain in 1889. Thus others were free to use the name on their own works. Since then, use of the name Webster has been widespread. Webster's New World Dictionary was introduced in 1951 by the World Publishing Company; as of 2026 it is published by Harper Collins. Random House's dictionaries are now called Random House Webster's.

Merriam-Webster's marketing emphasizes its role as successor to Noah Webster.
