= Clarence Barnhart =

American lexicographer

- Born: Charles Lewis Barnhart; December 30, 1900; Plattsburg, Missouri, U.S.
- Died: October 24, 1993 (aged 92); Peekskill, New York, U.S.
- Education: University of Chicago
- Occupation: Lexicographer
- Known for: Editor of the Thorndike-Barnhart series of dictionaries
- Spouse: Frances Irma Knox (m. 1931; died 1979)
- Children: David and Robert Barnhart

Clarence Lewis Barnhart (1900–1993) was an American lexicographer best known for editing the Thorndike-Barnhart series of graded dictionaries, published by Scott Foresman & Co. which were based on word lists and concepts of definition developed by psychological theorist Edward Thorndike. Barnhart subsequently revised and expanded the series and with the assistance of his sons, maintaining them through the 1980s.

== Early years ==
Barnhart was born near Plattsburg, Missouri, on 30 December 1900.

Barnhart attended the University of Chicago and studied under noted linguist and primary founder of the Linguistic Society of America, Leonard Bloomfield. Barnhart was influenced by Bloomfield's approach to learning which included developing word lists based on frequency of use and citation files based on real-world examples. In 1929, Barnhart joined book publisher Scott, Foresman & Co. eventually becoming an editor. Scott, Foresman paid for portions of his education in exchange for a promise of employment when his studies were complete. Barnhart graduated in 1930 and further undertook graduate studies from 1934 to 1937.

Barnhart married Frances Irma Knox on 21 February 1931.

Noted child psychologist Edward Thorndike approached Scott Foresman with his ideas for a children's dictionary based on his Teacher's Word Book (1921) and upcoming Teacher's Word Book of the Twenty Thousand Words Found Most Frequently and Widely in General Reading for Children and Young People (1932.) The Scott Foresman editors brought Barnhart in to explain Thorndike's proposal after which the project was approved. Together Thorndike and Barnhart co-created the Thorndike-Century Junior Dictionary in 1935 followed by the Thorndike-Century Senior Dictionary in 1941. A revised edition of the Junior Dictionary came out in 1942, followed by the Thorndike-Century Beginning Dictionary in 1945.

During World War II the United States Army approached the Linguistic Society of America seeking assistance to write a dictionary of military terms. Barnhart and Jess Stein (who would later go on to become the editor for the Random House Dictionary) were sent to New York and undertook the editing of the Dictionary of U.S. Army Terms (TM-20-205) for the War Department in 1944.

== Post-war years ==
While in New York, Barnhart found out that Random House had plans to produce an “Americanized” version of the Oxford Concise Dictionary. Random House had acquired the rights to the Century Dictionary and Cyclopedia in the late 1930s and the Dictionary of American English in the early 1940s. Barnhart approached Random House and convinced them to let him take complete control of the project, from concept to design to implementation. This resulted in the American College Dictionary, published in 1947. This work was later used as the basis of the Random House Dictionary.

Following American College Dictionary, Barnhart contracted with Scott, Foresman to produce the Thorndike-Barnhart dictionary series intended for school children. The new dictionaries were derived from the Thorndike-Century school dictionaries co-developed with Edward Thorndike in the 1930s and 1940s.

His first general reference book published under the Thorndike-Barnhart name was the Thorndike-Barnhart Comprehensive Desk Dictionary, first published in 1951. This was followed by the Thorndike-Barnhart Handy Pocket Dictionary (1953), and the Thorndike-Barnhart Concise Dictionary (1956.)

Under Random House he produced the New Century Cyclopedia of Names in 1954, a three volume expansion of the original 1894 volume of the Century Dictionary and Cyclopedia. From the New Century Cyclopedia of Names he further produced The New Century Handbook of English Literature published in 1956.

In the 1950s and 1960s, he also developed the linguistic approach to reading instruction begun by Leonard Bloomfield, entitled Let's Read which was published in 1961.

Barnhart, aided by his sons, continued to update and revise the Thorndike-Barnhart school dictionaries throughout the 1960s, 1970s and 1980s. These became the most popular school dictionaries in the United States. All dictionaries for schools were published by Scott Foresman and in the trade market by Doubleday. During the 1980s the dictionaries were published under two alternative titles. The advanced dictionary was published as either Thorndike-Barnhart Advanced Dictionary or Thorndike-Barnhart Student's Dictionary. The middle dictionary was published as either Thorndike-Barnhart Intermediate Dictionary or Thorndike-Barnhart Advanced Junior Dictionary. The junior dictionary was published as either Thorndike-Barnhart Beginning Dictionary or Thorndike-Barnhart Junior Dictionary. In 1997 Scott Foresman was bought out by Pearson plc and merged into their publishing company Addison-Wesley. Upon the formation of Pearson Education in 1998 the company retired the work in favour of their own Longman dictionary range.

His largest general dictionary was the World Book Dictionary, a two-volume work created as a supplement to the World Book Encyclopedia. It is essentially an expanded and more advanced version of the Thorndike-Barnhart school dictionaries. It was first published in 1963 and was updated annually until 1976, whereupon it had a major revision, totaling approximately 225,000 individual entries. Consistent with the encyclopedia's use by young people, Barnhart wrote definitions which were both simple and accurate, and most entries include sample sentences or phrases. Many definitions are the same, or almost the same, as those of the Thorndike-Barnhart school dictionaries. Like Webster's Third New International, it included few proper names, leaving them to be covered by the companion volumes of the encyclopedia. Throughout the 1980s up until the 1990s the work was periodically revised and updated with the last revision done by his son Robert and his wife Cynthia Barnhart in 1996.

He also co-edited of The Barnhart Dictionary of New English Since 1963 (copyright 1973), The Second Barnhart Dictionary of New English (copyright 1980), and The Third Barnhart Dictionary of New English (copyright 1990). These works were designed to cover new words, meanings, and changes in usage. In 1982, with his son David, he began editing a quarterly publication devoted to thorough dictionary treatment of new words, new meanings and changes in usage entitled The Barnhart Dictionary Companion.

Nearly all of his dictionaries were based heavily upon the collection of evidence, the value of which he learned from work he did for Sir William Craigie on the Dictionary of American English at the University of Chicago. Over his career of 64 years he and his staff accumulated a file of over 7 million quotations exhibiting contemporary usage of English words. He was active in interlinguistics, serving as a consultant to the research body that presented Interlingua in 1951. In the late 20th century he and his son helped to pioneer the use of electronically retrievable evidence from computerized files of news publications.

His sons, David Barnhart and Robert Barnhart, worked with him on many of his later projects.

Barnhart's wife, Frances, died on 28 November 1979.

Barnhart died on 24 October 1993, in Peekskill, New York.
