= Laurence Urdang =

American lexicographer and author (1927–2008)

- Born: March 21, 1927; Manhattan, New York City, U.S.
- Died: August 21, 2008 (aged 81); Branford, Connecticut
- Occupations: Lexicographer, dictionary editor

Laurence Urdang (March 21, 1927 – August 21, 2008) was a lexicographer, editor and author noted for first computerising the unabridged Random House Dictionary of the English Language, published in 1966. The dataset for the dictionary contained a 25,000,000-word corpus.

He was also the founding editor of Verbatim, a quarterly newsletter on language.

Urdang was born in Manhattan and graduated from the Fieldston School in The Bronx. He then entered the Naval Reserve at the end of World War II.

Educated at Columbia University (where he restricted himself to Russian, German, Latin, Greek, Sanskrit and Polish), Urdang was a linguistics lecturer at New York University from 1956 to 1961. Although he never wrote the dissertation that would have completed his graduate degree, the Random House Dictionary filled the void amply: "He always said he considered the Random House dictionary his dissertation," said Nicole Urdang.

Urdang made his debut in the publishing industry as an associate editor in the dictionary department at Funk & Wagnalls and developed a vast vocabulary. Not averse to making fun of his profession, he wrote in the introduction to Misunderstood, Misused, & Mispronounced Words:

This is not a succedaneum for satisfying the nympholepsy of nullifidians. Rather it is hoped that the haecceity of this enchiridion of arcane and recondite sesquipedalian items will appeal to the oniomania of an eximious Gemeinschaft whose legerity and sophrosyne, whose Sprachgefühl and orexis will find more than fugacious fulfillment among its felicific pages.

He died on August 21, 2008, of congestive heart failure in Branford, Connecticut.

== Bibliography ==
- Urdang, Laurence: New York Times Dictionary of Misunderstood, Misused, & Mispronounced Words. New York City: Black Dog & Leventhal Publishers. ISBN 978-1-57912-060-3.
- Urdang, Laurence: Dictionary of Differences. Bloomsbury Publishing. London. Revised 1992. ISBN 0-7475-1222-1
