= A Dictionary of Canadianisms on Historical Principles =

Dictionary of words distinct to Canada

A Dictionary of Canadianisms on Historical Principles (DCHP) is a historical usage dictionary of words, expressions, or meanings which are native to Canada or which are distinctively characteristic of Canadian English though not necessarily exclusive to Canada. The first edition was published by W. J. Gage Limited in 1967. The text of this first edition was scanned and released as a free-access online dictionary in 2013.

A second edition of A Dictionary of Canadianisms on Historical Principles (DCHP-2), was then created by expanding and partially revising the first edition's data set. DCHP-2 was published in 2017 as an academic project by the University of British Columbia, and is only available as a free-access online dictionary.

A third edition A Dictionary of Canadianisms on Historical Principles (DCHP-3), this time in mobile-friendly format, was released in 2025 with 181 new meanings relating to minoritized groups and the originally more informal vocabulary.

== History ==
The origins of the first Canadian Dictionary (DCHP-1) can be linked to American Lexicographer Charles Julien Lovell just after WW2 in 1946. Predating this, the American OED dictionary included the small number of Canadian words found in their research as was the practice during this time for larger varieties. Lovell, working at the time for the University of Chicago and the Dictionary of Americanisms, felt that there was a true distinction between American words and Canadian ones. This led Lovell to create a separate file for words that he deemed to be Canadian as he traversed across the country. In 1954, after creation of the Canadian Linguistic Association, Lovell proposed his idea of the creation of the first Canadian Dictionary, and shortly after submitted an article on the “Lexicographical Challenges of Canadian English”. In March 1960, funding was granted to create the first Canadian Dictionary, DCHP-1 (Dictionary of Canadianisms on Historical Principles).Charles Lovell died just weeks later.

The lead of the project would then be taken on and headed by Lovell's colleague and friend, Walter Spencer Avis. A professor of English at the Royal Military College in Kingston, Ontario. Without intention, Avis, came to become a dictionary editor and leader to complete DCHP-1. Along with him, Patrick Drysdale, Chuck Crate, Douglas Leechman, and Mathew Scargill (these names, with Avis and Lovell would become known as the big six of creating Canadian English). Drysdale focused on working with the publisher of the dictionary in Toronto, W.J. Gage publishing and relayed information to the team. Avis, Crate, And Leechman were responsible for controlling the majority of the information brought in through slips.> Scargill, the “director of the Lexicographical Centre in Victoria'' was the promoter and organizer of the DCHP. The Publisher, Gage, requested that four versions of the dictionary were to be made: the Beginning Dictionary, Intermediate Dictionary, Senior Dictionary, and the Complete version DCHP-1. The final dictionary was completed just in time for Canadians' Centennial year In November 1967.

In 2006, after almost 40 years of existence without any updates, work on a new edition was started. Nelson Education Ltd., which had acquired Gage Ltd. and with it the rights to the DCHP-1 had been actively seeking collaborators in academia to produce a new edition of the DCHP-1. This project, DCHP-2, was proposed at a conference on Canadian English in January 2005.

Completed in 2011 after automatic scanning and manual proofreading by a team at UBC, DCHP-1 was republished in open access as of 2013, thanks to Nelson Ltd. (Dollinger et al. 2013), and is available as a free website, DCHP-1 Online.

The second edition was edited by Stefan Dollinger (editor-in-chief) and Margery Fee (associate editor) and includes features not part of the first edition: a six-way classification system for Canadianisms, the Dictionary Editing Tool, and the Bank of Canadian English (BCE), a quotation database.

== Creating DCHP-3 ==
The process of digitization started with the scanning and of the first edition of the dictionary (DCHP-1). The online version of DCHP-1 was made publicly accessible in 2013.

The main data collection phase for the DCHP-2 lasted from 2007 to 2010 and included 36,000 new citations derived from the 7,000 new potential headwords found in The Canadian Oxford Dictionary and other sources. Potential headwords and citations were cross-checked with other varieties of English using web data and entered into the Bank of Canadian English, a quotation filing system, to be proofread and edited. The potential headwords and citations were then classified into one of the six categories of Canadianisms according to their distinctive histories in Canada, cultural significance, or usage frequency.

DCHP-2 was released online on 17 March 2017.{{source needed}} The launch coincided with the 57th anniversary of Charles J. Lovell's passing, the founding editor of DCHP-1. DCHP-1 was launched as a Centennial project; DCHP-2 was launched as a Sesquicentennial contribution with the goal of lifting the discussion about Canadianisms, and about Canadian English more generally, on an empirically sounder footing.

The Third Edition, DCHP-3, was released on 15 May 2025. Its code base was rewritten to accommodate mobile phone use and includes an editorial update of 181 meanings for a total of 12,000 headwords and 14,500 meanings from 1500 to 2025. Work began in 2022 and lasted through May 2025. The third edition update focuses on underrepresented groups, e.g. First Nations (lahal, kokum, skoden), and vocabulary from informal origins, e.g. urban slang (freezie, ding, levidrome) and rural slang (klick, hang a larry, shit-kicking).

== Typology ==
The DCHP-3 and DCHP-2 list six types of Canadianism with an additional "non-Canadian" category:

- Type 1: Origin: terms or meanings are created in Canada. Examples would be loonie (one-dollar coin) and toonie (two-dollar coin).
- Type 2: Preservation: A form or meaning that was once widespread across many English language variations but is now preserved in Canadian English. An example would be pencil crayon (colouring pencil), and Chesterfield (couch, sofa).
- Type 3: Semantic Change: Terms that have undergone a semantic change in Canadian English. For instance, toque (beanie), which had earlier referred to other kinds of hats, not just the ones we now associate with the word toque, or Generation X "late '80s disoriented adults."
- Type 4: Culturally Significant: Terms or meanings enshrined and important to the national identity and/or history of Canada. The discourse marker eh, hockey terms such as wrap around and the term French immersion are examples.
- Type 5: Frequency: Terms or meanings that are used and heard more frequently in Canadian English than in other national identities. For instance, cube van (moving truck) or Chinook (strong wind).
- Type 6: Memorial: These terms are the opposite of cultural salience, meaning terms deriving from adverse events or historical occurrences in Canada. An example would be residential schools or Inuit (Eskimo)
- Non-Canadian: Terms or meanings labelled 'Canadian' in other sources or that are thought to be Canadian but are not. For instance, clawback or sunset clause.

== Reception ==
The Toronto Star referred to it as a great "birthday gift for the nation" of Canada, The Globe and Mail lauded its detail (e.g. the entry on eh, which is almost 5000 words long) and the CBC The National Newscast featured DCHP-2 in April 2017 as the topic of its cultural news item of the day.

== See also ==
- List of Canadian English dictionaries
- Dictionary of American English
- Dictionary of Americanisms
- Dictionary of American Regional English
- Oxford English Dictionary

== Notes ==
- Cassidy, Frederick G. and Joan Houston Hall (eds.). 1985, 1991, 1996, 2002, in prep. Dictionary of American Regional English. Volumes I–V. Cambridge, MA: Belknap Press of Harvard University Press.
- Craigie, William and James R. Hulbert (eds.). 1968 [1938–44]. A Dictionary of American English on Historical Principles. 4 volumes. Chicago: University of Chicago Press.
- DA = Dictionary of Americanisms. See Mathews (ed.) 1951.
- DAE = A Dictionary of American English on Historical Principles. See Craigie and Hulbert (eds.) 1968 [1938–44].
- DARE = Dictionary of American Regional English. See Cassidy and Hall (eds.) 1985, 1991, 1996, 2002, in prep.
- OED = Oxford English Dictionary
