= Eh =

Spoken interjection in English

Eh (/ˈeɪ/ or /ˈɛ/) is a spoken interjection used in many varieties of English. The oldest Oxford English Dictionary defines eh as "an interjectional interrogative particle often inviting assent to the sentiment expressed." Today, while eh has many different uses, it is most popularly used in a manner similar to "Excuse me?", "Can you repeat that?", "Huh?", or to otherwise mark a question. It is also commonly used as an alternative to the question tag "right?", as a method for inciting a reply; as in, "Don't you think?", "Do you agree with me?"

In the Americas, it is most commonly associated with Canada and Canadian English, though it is also common in England, Scotland, and New Zealand. It is also known in some American regions bordering Canada, including the area stretching from northern Wisconsin up to Michigan's Upper Peninsula.

The spelling of this sound in English is quite different from the common usage of these letters. The vowel is sounded in one of the continental manners (as in French, only missing the acute accent), and the letter "h" is used to indicate it is long, as though the origin of the spelling were German.

While evidence suggests that eh initially may have been considered as an onomatopoeic sound, the earliest uses of eh found so far, date back to Early Modern English in 1662, but first mentions of it are found in Middle English. In 1707, it was first used in a play, functioning "to create or confirm agreement." Later, in 1773, its earliest quotation, s.v. "eh" was in a play by Irish playwright Oliver Goldsmith.

It can also convey a lack of strong emotion and a neutral response. For example, if when asked how a movie was one replies with "eh", this indicates that they did not find it particularly great or terrible. In this example, eh is used as a way to convey a middle-ground feeling or invite further discussion.

== English ==
=== United States ===
Eh is also used in situations to describe something bad or mediocre. In which, it is often pronounced with a short "e" sound and the "h" may even be noticeable.

It is quite prevalent in the New York area to use the term "ey" as a general substitute for basic greetings, such as "hey" or "hello".

In the Upper Midwest, it is used to end sentences.

=== Canada ===
==== History ====
The first clear evidence of eh's usage in Canada was in 1836, through the writings of Thomas Chandler Haliburton, a Nova-Scotian district judge and comical writer. Eh was first recognized as being a marker of being Canadian in 1959 by Harold B. Allen; he stated that eh is "so exclusively a Canadian feature that immigration officials use it as an identifying clue." However, despite mainly being perceived as a stereotypical marker of Canadian identity, eh was not recognized initially as a Canadianism in the Dictionary of Canadianisms on Historical Principles (DCHP-1). Chief editor of the DCHP-1, Walter Avis, argued that it should not be included due to its historical use in British English and its frequency in American, Australian, and New Zealand English. However, despite eh's origins, it has become more frequently used in Canada than in the UK and the US, and in a broader variety of contexts. Due to this frequency, it has since been included in the DCHP-2 as a Preservation of British English that is Culturally Significant.

==== Uses ====
According to the DCHP-2, there are five main uses of eh with four subtypes. The first is used to elicit confirmation (1a), which can be used in sentences like "So that's what he thinks, eh?" A subtype of this use is to elicit acknowledgement (1b). This applies to the acknowledgment of a fact in contrast to belief or opinion. For example, one could say "I have a new dog, eh?" The second subtype (1c) is to confirm agreement. This is used to increase the chance of acceptance of a suggestion, toning down statements. The fourth, (1d), is used as an exclamative over a shared experience, for example "What a great game, eh?" The final (1e) is to confirm compliance, like asking "Will you?" The belief is that this tones down a command or request.

The second main use of eh is as an expression of disbelief to express one's surprise over the offered information (2). Use 3 is to elicit repetition, and is referred to as the "Pardon eh." It is used synonymously with "I beg your pardon?" in the sense of asking for a repetition of what was said. The fourth use is a distinctly Canadian use, identified as the narrative eh. It is a rarer form, and is claimed to be found primarily in oral evidence of Canadian origin. The final use of eh is as a metalinguistic commentary to express a link with Canada or rural Canada (5). This form is commentary on the Canadian status of eh and has contributed its share to the registration of eh and commodification of the form in association with Canada. A popular example of its use is in the phrase "How's it goin', eh?"

Due to English and French being Canada's official languages, the popularity of eh's usage in Canada is believed to be influenced by French. The French Canadian hein sounds similar to a nasalized Canadian eh, and the two share similar functions. Due to this, the increased use of eh in Canada may have been influenced by the frequent use of hein in Canadian French.

The term is used most frequently among blue-collar workers, and the most popular form used is for opinions and exclamations. While there is a prevalent stereotype that men use eh more than women, survey results suggest similar use frequencies. Overall, between both men and women, the pardon-eh is used much less than the observation-eh. The most positively viewed usage of eh is the imperative "I know, eh?" form with the exclamation-eh and opinion-eh close behind. The most negatively viewed usage is the anecdotal, narrative-eh. This perception is due to opinions surrounding the speakers of the narrative-eh, who are categorized as uneducated, lower-class, rural, and male, akin to the McKenzie brothers from the comedy sketch "Great White North", which first appeared during Second City Television's (SCTV) third season.

Regionally, while usage is similar across the ten provinces, with the use of eh not having changed significantly over the past 25 years, there is some variation. For example, in Quebec, respondents use eh for 'pardon' more than other Canadians. While usage has not changed significantly across Canada, the overall frequency of eh has declined among speakers born in the 1960s or later. This decrease has been prevalent in big cities such as Vancouver and Toronto. Despite this decline, there have been high recognition rates and uptake of the Canadian eh among immigrant populations.

==== Iconography ====
Eh is recognized among Canadians and used by newspaper journalists and others in informal articles and reports. Also, eh is attributed freely in reported conversations with all men, including athletes, professors, and politicians, such as Pierre Trudeau.

The prevalence of eh in Canadian iconography is strongly associated with its recognition as part of the Canadian national or regional identity. In print, it is used primarily to signify 'Canadian,' with many websites incorporating eh into their URLs to indicate a Canadian connection. It is also popularly incorporated into Canadian-targeted marketing campaigns, such as when Smarties' Canadian-themed packaging was labelled "SMARTIES eh?"

The usage of eh in Canada is occasionally mocked in the United States, where some view its use as a stereotypical Canadianism. Such stereotypes have been reinforced in popular culture and were famously lampooned in South Park: Bigger, Longer & Uncut. Singer Don Freed, in his song "Saskatchewan", declares, "What is this 'Eh?'-nonsense? I wouldn't speak like that if I were paid to". There are many products displaying the phrase, such as T-shirts and coffee mugs.

==== Future usage ====
On the basis of speaker attitudes, the speech of younger speakers, and new Canadians' adoption of eh, Elaine Gold argues that the expression is likely to see continuing use and to continue functioning as a marker of Canadian identity. Students account for a large percentage of eh users and continue to contribute to the growing community. In addition to the popularity amongst students, immigrants are essential to the future of eh. Survey results on immigrant recognition of eh show that immigrants had high rates of recognition for most types of eh, with opinion-eh and exclamation-eh at the top. The data shows that while the usage of eh in immigrant communities is different, it is still common. This shows that even though native speakers still use eh more frequently, there is no evidence that eh is falling out of use. Altogether, Canada's link with bilingualism has contributed to eh's common usage, and its recognition amongst immigrants suggests that eh will continue to be prevalent in Canadian culture.

=== New Zealand ===
While not as commonly lampooned as the Canadian eh, there are few features that are more eagerly recognized by New Zealanders as a marker of their identity than the tag particle eh (commonly spelt as ay, although this has been contentious). New Zealanders use eh much more than Canadians, who are more famous for the word. This commonly used and referenced feature of New Zealand English (NZE) is one of great controversy to many communication scholars as it is both a mark of cultural identity and simultaneously a means to parody those of a lower socioeconomic status. The use of eh in New Zealand is very common among all demographics.

Communications scholar Miriam Meyerhoff describes eh as a "validation checker" to create connections between speakers. She says that there are two main uses of the phrase: to signify a question, such as "You went to school in Christchurch, eh?"; or to confirm that the listener understands new information, such as "He was way bigger than me, eh". It is believed that eh became common in New Zealand due to similarity with the Māori word nē, which has a similar use.

A 1994 study by Meyerhoff sought to examine the function of eh in New Zealand culture. She hypothesized that eh did not function as a clarification device as frequently believed, but instead served as a means of establishing solidarity between individuals of similar ethnic descent. In her research, Meyerhoff analyzed conversations between an interviewer and an interviewee of either Pākehā or Māori descent and calculated the frequency of eh in the conversation. In order to yield the most natural speech, Meyerhoff instructed the interviewers to introduce themselves as a "friend of a friend", to their respective interviewees. Her results showed Māori men as the most frequent users of eh in their interviews. As Māori are typically of a lower socio-economic status, Meyerhoff proposed that eh functioned as a verbal cue that one reciprocated by another individual signified both shared identity and mutual acceptance. Therefore, in the context of Meyerhoff's research, eh can be equated as a device to establish and maintain a group identity. This phenomenon sheds light on the continuous scholarly debate questioning if language determines culture or culture determines language. In New Zealand eh is used more often by males than females, more by younger generations than older generations, and more by the middle class than the working class. Māori use eh about twice as much as Pākehā, irrespective of their gender, age or class.

=== England, Scotland and Ireland ===
The usage of the word is widespread throughout much of the UK, particularly in Eastern Scotland, the north of England, Northern Ireland, and Wales. It is normally used to mean 'what?'. In Scotland, mainly around the Tayside region, eh is also used as a shortened term for 'yes'. For example, "Are you going to the disco?" "Eh". In Aberdeen and the wider Doric Scots speaking area of Grampian, eh is often used to end a sentence, as a continuation or sometimes, inflection is added and it's used as a confirmation, or with different inflection, a question. For example, "I was walking home, eh, and I saw a badger, eh", "It was a big car, eh" or "We're going to the co-op, eh?".

=== Rest of the world ===
Eh? used to solicit agreement or confirmation is also heard regularly amongst speakers in Australia, Trinidad and Tobago and the United Kingdom (where it is sometimes spelled ay on the assumption that eh would rhyme with heh or meh). In the Caribbean island of Barbados the word nuh acts similarly, as does noh in Surinamese Dutch and Sranantongo. The usage in New Zealand is similar, and is more common in the North Island. It is also heard in the United States, especially Minnesota, Wisconsin, the Upper Peninsula of Michigan (although the Scandinavian-based Yooperism ya is more common), Oklahoma, and the New England region. In New England and Oklahoma, it is also used as a general exclamation as in Scotland and the Channel Islands of Jersey and Guernsey. It is occasionally used to express indifference, in a similar way to meh.

Since usage of the word eh is not as common in the United States as it is in Canada, it is often used by Americans, and indeed Canadians themselves, to parody Canadian English.

The equivalent in South African English is hey. This usage is also common in Western Canada.

Eh is also used in Guernsey English and Jersey English.

Eh is very common in the English spoken in the Seychelles.

In Singapore, the use of medium Singlish often includes eh as an interjection, but it is not as popularly used as lah. An example of a sentence that uses eh is "Dis guy Singlish damn good eh", meaning "this guy's Singlish is very good".

Similar to Singapore, Malaysia also uses eh in Manglish as an interjection. It is also used as an exclamation to express surprise, depending on the length and context of the eh. It also depends how one sounds uses it as a short eh can be a sarcastic shock or a genuine one. Sometimes it can be used as the equivalent as oi when the speaker is being angry to the listener such as "Eh, hello!?" or "Eh, can you not!?". A long eeeh can be a disgusted shock, annoyance, or greater surprise. The eh usage here is similar to the Japanese usage. It is used by all Malaysians regardless of what language they are using.

== Similar terms in other languages ==
- Hè ('heh' Audio) (not to be confused with hé ('hey' Audio), an informal greeting and (potentially rude) way of getting someone's attention is an informal yet very common Dutch interjection that can be used as a brief exclamation to indicate confusion or surprise ('huh?'), in a prolonged manner when disappointed or annoyed ('aww'), or at the end of any sentence to form a tag question. The third usage is arguably the most popular. It very closely compares with "Eh" in Canadian English. In the regional dialects of Zealand and West Flanders, the corresponding and frequently used interjection hé, is in fact pronounced the same as in English (note that the equivalent of Dutch [ɦ] is silent in Zealandic and West Flemish).
- Japanese Hé?/え？ ([heː]) is a common exclamation in Japanese and is used to express surprise. It is also used when the listener did not fully understand or hear what the speaker said. It can be lengthened to show greater surprise (e.g. Heeeeee?!). Ne and naa are extremely similar to the Canadian eh, being statement ending particles which solicit or assume agreement, confirmation, or comprehension on the part of the listener.
- Portuguese né?, a contraction of não é? meaning 'isn't it?', is used to turn a statement into a question, even if no answer is expected, for emphasis or other objectives.
- Hein is used in French and in Portuguese in much the same way as in English.
- Hain is used in Mauritian Creole and it can express a variety of ideas. It is generally used in context of a conversation and is generally interpreted very quickly.
- Gell/gelle or oder, wa, wat or wahr ('true' or 'correct') or nä/ne/net (from nicht, 'not') are used in (very) colloquial German to express a positive interrogative at the end of a sentence, much as eh is used in Canadian English. Statements expressed in Standard German are more commonly phrased in negative terms, and outside of colloquial usage the ending interrogative is often nicht wahr, which invites a response of stimmt ('agreed', literally 'that's right').
- Nietwaar is used in Dutch in the same way as nicht wahr is in German.
- Spanish ¿No?, literally translated to English as 'no', is often put at the end of a statement to change it into a question and give emphasis, i.e. Hace buen tiempo, ¿no? ('The weather is nice, isn't it?'). Eh is also used as well for emphasis, as in ¡Te vas a caer de la silla, eh! ('You're going to fall from the chair, if you keep doing that!'). Che also has a similar function.
- In Catalan, eh? is also commonly used.
- Swiss German oder meaning 'or' in English, is commonly used interrogatively as '... or what?' and gäll/gell at the end of sentences in German-speaking Switzerland, especially in the Zurich area. It is used more as a matter of conversational convention than for its meaning. The expression ni is used in highest Alemannic-speaking parts, and is used similarly to net in German. The term Äh is also used, which is pronounced similarly to eh in English and has the same meaning.
- Azerbaijani ha?, hı?, hay?, and hıy? are commonly used as 'huh?'. Alternatively, hə? 'yes?', and düzdür? 'is it correct?' can be used as 'isn't it?'.
- Pakistani Urdu ہیں؟ is used to mean 'what? say it again'.
- Egyptian Arabic ايه؟ ([ˈeːh]) is used to mean 'what? say it again'. It could also mean 'what's wrong?' either in a concerned manner or a more aggressive one, depending on the tone used to pose the question. Besides, it could refer to an exclamation.
- Levantine Arabic ايش or شو (esh, shoo) as 'what?'.
- Gulf Arabic وشو (wisho) is used to mean 'what?'.
- Regional Italian neh is used in regional Northern Italian as spoken in Piedmont, Western Lombardy (Northwestern Italy), and the Ticino (Southern Switzerland), with the meaning of "isn't it true?". It comes from the expression in the local languages (Piedmontese and Lombard) N'è (mia/pa) vera?, which means, once again, 'isn't it true?'

== See also ==
- English interjections
- Discourse marker
- Canadian English
