= Walter Spencer Avis =

Canadian linguist

Walter Spencer Avis was one of the foremost Canadian linguists of his day. Throughout the 1950s to his death at age 60, Avis' mission has been described as "plant[ing] into the minds of his compatriots the notion of Canadian English (CanE) as related but different from other "Englishes"." In that sense, Avis was an early proponent of World Englishes, by looking at non-dominant standard forms, with Standard Canadian English in focus, in what would later be called a pluricentric model.

Avis was the editor-in-chief of the first edition of the Dictionary of Canadianisms on Historical Principles. Born in Toronto in 1919, Avis belonged to the first generation of PhD-level trained linguists in Canada. He published as of 1950 in the areas of historical linguistics, dialectology, linguistic variation, Canadian English and the budding field of sociolinguistics.

== Life and education ==
Avis served with the Canadian Forces in Italy during the latter part of World War II. Upon his return to Canada, Avis finished his matriculation (high school degree), while his wife Faith Avis (née Hutchison) had acquired a B.A. in journalism from Carleton in Ottawa in 1946. Faith was, at that time, was one of the most highly educated women in Canada. Avis received a B.A. in 1949 at Queen's University. He received an M.A. in 1950 also from Queen's University. He completed work on and earned his PhD in 1955 from the University of Michigan.

== Positions and honours ==
From 1952 to his death in 1979, Avis was professor of English at Royal Military College, Kingston, Ontario. He was a long-term secretary of the Canadian Linguistic Association, President from 1968–70, and was slated to become president-elect of the American Dialect Society in January 1980; however, he died suddenly in December 1979.

== Death and legacy ==
Avis died in December 1979 from a heart attack. He left behind materials and data for a second edition of DCHP, which the remaining members of the editorial team, Matthew H. Scargill, Douglas Leechman, Charles B. Crate and Patrick Drysdale, completed by the late Charles J. Lovell, were unable to utilize. A second edition, DCHP-2, would appear, using some of the legacy data, in 2017 by a new editorial team.

== Major works ==
- Avis, Walter S., Patrick D. Drysdale, Robert J. Gregg, Victoria E. Neufeldt and Matthew H. Scargill (eds). 1983. Gage Canadian dictionary. Toronto: Gage.
- Avis, Walter S. (ed.-in-chief), Charles Crate, Patrick Drysdale, Douglas Leechman, Matthew H. Scargill and Charles J. Lovell (eds). 1967. A Dictionary of Canadianisms on Historical Principles. Toronto: Gage. Digitized as Dollinger, Stefan; Laurel Brinton and Margery Fee. Eds. 2013. DCHP-1 Online. Based on Avis et al. (1967). UBC Vancouver.
- Avis, Walter S. and A. M. Kinloch (eds). [1978]. Writings on Canadian English, 1792-1975. An annotated bibliography. Toronto: Fitzhenry & Whiteside.
- Avis, Walter S. 1973. The English language in Canada In Current trends in linguistics. Vol. 10/1, Thomas Sebeok (ed.), 40-74. The Hague: Mouton.
- Avis, Walter S. 1972. So Eh? is Canadian, Eh? Canadian Journal of Linguistics 17(2): 89-104.
- Avis, Walter S. 1956. Speech differences along the Ontario-United States border. III: Pronunciation. Journal of the Canadian Linguistic Association 2(1, Mar.): 41-59.
- Avis, Walter S. 1955. Speech differences along the Ontario-United States border. II: Grammar and syntax. Journal of the Canadian Linguistic Association 1(1, Mar.): 14-19.
- Avis, Walter S. 1954. Speech differences along the Ontario-United States border. I: Vocabulary. Journal of the Canadian Linguistic Association 1(1, Oct.): 13-18.
- Avis, Walter S. 1950. The speech of Sam Slick. MA Thesis, Queen's University, Kingston, Ontario.
