= Gage Educational Publishing Company =

Canadian educational publisher

Gage Educational Publishing Company, otherwise known as Gage Learning, is a division of Nelson Education (nelson.com), a major Canadian publisher of school textbooks and educational reference books.

== History ==
Gage Educational is descended from W. J. Gage & Company, Ltd., a Toronto publisher renamed in 1879 for its partner William James Gage (1849–1921); formerly Adam Miller and Company.

Throughout the second half of the twentieth century, Gage was a well-known Canadian publishing company. Gage's dictionaries were a staple in many elementary school classrooms, as were Gage-published workbooks and textbooks. The Gage senior-level dictionary, as of 1983 called the Gage Canadian Dictionary was often considered the official dictionary of Canadian English. The Gage Canadian Dictionary was one of three school dictionaries in the Dictionary of Canadian English Series, which as of 1962 defined the lexicography of Canadian English. The scholarly flagship dictionary in that series was the 1st edition of A Dictionary of Canadianisms on Historical Principles (Avis et al. 1967).
