= Canadian English =

Variety of English language

- Region: Canada
- Native speakers: 21 million in Canada (2021 census) about 15 million, c. 7 million of which with French as the L1
- Language family: Indo-European: Germanic; West Germanic; North Sea Germanic; Anglo-Frisian; Anglic; English; North American English; Canadian English
- Early forms: Old English: Middle English; Early Modern English; Modern English; 18th century British English; 19th century British English
- Dialects: Indigenous; Atlantic (Including: Newfoundlander and Lunenburger); Toronto; Ottawa Valley; Quebec English
- Writing system: Latin (English alphabet); Unified English Braille

Language codes
- ISO 639-3: –
- Glottolog: cana1268
- IETF: en-CA

Canadian English (CanE, CE, en-CA) encompasses the varieties of English spoken in Canada, the most widespread variety of Canadian English being Standard Canadian English. English is the most widely spoken language in Canada. It is spoken in all the western and central provinces of Canada (varying from Central Canada to British Columbia) and also in many other provinces among urban middle- or upper-class speakers from natively English-speaking families. Standard Canadian English is distinct from Atlantic Canadian English (its most notable subset being Newfoundland English), and from Quebec English.

While Canadian English tends to be close to American English in most regards, classifiable together as North American English, Canadian English also possesses elements from British English as well as some uniquely Canadian characteristics. The precise influence of American English, British English, and other sources on Canadian English varieties has been the ongoing focus of systematic studies since the 1950s. Standard Canadian and General American English share identical or near-identical phonemic inventories, though their exact phonetic realizations may sometimes differ. Accent differences can also be heard between those who live in urban centres versus those living in rural settings.

Canadians and Americans themselves often have trouble differentiating their own two accents, particularly since Standard Canadian and Western United States English have both been undergoing the Low-Back-Merger Shift since the 1980s.

== History ==
Canadian English as an academic field of inquiry solidified around the time of the Second World War. While early linguistic approaches date back to the second half of the 19th century, the first textbook to consider Canadian English in one form or another was not published until 1940. Walter S. Avis was its most forceful spokesperson after the Second World War until the 1970s. His team of lexicographers managed to date the term "Canadian English" to a speech by a Scottish Presbyterian minister, the Reverend Archibald Constable Geikie, in an address to the Canadian Institute in 1857. Geikie, a Scottish-born Canadian, reflected the Anglocentric attitude that would be prevalent in Canada for the next hundred years when he referred to the language as "a corrupt dialect", in comparison with what he considered the proper English spoken by immigrants from Britain.

One of the earliest influences on Canadian English was the French language, which was brought to Canada by the French colonists in the 17th century. French words and expressions were adopted into Canadian English, especially in the areas of cuisine, politics, and social life. For example, words like poutine and toque are uniquely Canadian French terms that have become part of the Canadian English lexicon.

An important influence on Canadian English was British English, which was brought to Canada by British settlers in the 18th and 19th centuries. Canadian English borrowed many words and expressions from British English, including words like lorry, flat, and lift. However, Canadian English also developed its own unique vocabulary, including words like toque, chesterfield, and double-double. In the early 20th century, western Canada was largely populated by farmers from Central and Eastern Europe who were not anglophones. At the time, most anglophones there were re-settlers from Ontario or Quebec who had British, Irish, or Loyalist ancestry, or some mixture of these. Throughout the 20th century, the prairies underwent anglicization and linguistic homogenization through education and exposure to Canadian and American media.

American English also had a significant impact on the origins of Canadian English as well as again in the 20th century and since then as a result of increased cultural and economic ties between the two countries. American English terms like gasoline, truck, and apartment are commonly used in Canadian English.

The growth of Canadian media, including television, film, and literature, has also played a role in shaping Canadian English. Chambers (1998) notes that Canadian media has helped to create new words and expressions that reflect Canadian culture and values. Canadian institutions, such as the CBC and the Canadian Oxford Dictionary, have also played a role in promoting and defining Canadian English.

In addition to these influences, Canadian English has also been minorly shaped by Indigenous languages. Indigenous words such as moose, toboggan, kayak, skookum, and moccasin have become part of the Canadian English lexicon.

Canadian English is the product of five waves of immigration and settlement over a period of more than two centuries. The first large wave of permanent English-speaking settlement in Canada, and linguistically the most important, was the influx of Loyalists fleeing the American Revolution, chiefly from the Mid-Atlantic States—as such, Canadian English is believed by some scholars to have derived from northern American English. Canadian English has been developing features of its own since the early 19th century. The second wave from Britain and Ireland was encouraged to settle in Canada after the War of 1812 by the governors of Canada, who were worried about American dominance and influence among its citizens. Further waves of immigration from around the globe peaking in 1910, 1960, and at the present time had a lesser influence, but they did make Canada a multicultural country, ready to accept linguistic change from around the world during the current period of globalization.

The languages of Aboriginal peoples in Canada started to influence European languages used in Canada even before widespread settlement took place, and the French of Lower Canada provided vocabulary, with words such as tuque and portage, to the English of Upper Canada.

Overall, the history of Canadian English is a reflection of the country's diverse linguistic and cultural heritage. While Canadian English has borrowed many words and expressions from other languages, it has also developed its own unique vocabulary and pronunciation that reflects the country's distinct identity.

== Historical linguistics ==
Studies on earlier forms of English in Canada are rare. An overview of diachronic work on Canadian English, or diachronically relevant work, is Dollinger. Until the 2000s, basically all commentators on the history of CanE have argued from the "language-external" history, i.e. social and political history. An exception has been in the area of lexis, where Avis et al.'s 1967 Dictionary of Canadianisms on Historical Principles offered real-time historical data through its quotations. Starting in the 2000s, historical linguists have started to study earlier Canadian English with historical linguistic data. DCHP-1 is now available in open access. Most notably, Dollinger (2008) pioneered the historical corpus linguistic approach for English in Canada with CONTE (Corpus of Early Ontario English, 1776–1849) and offers a developmental scenario for 18th- and 19th-century Ontario.

=== Canadian dainty ===
Historically, Canadian English included a class-based sociolect known as Canadian dainty. Treated as a marker of upper-class prestige in the 19th and early 20th centuries, Canadian dainty was marked by the use of some features of British English pronunciation, resulting in an accent similar, but not identical, to the Mid-Atlantic accent known in the United States. This accent faded in prominence following World War II, when it became stigmatized as pretentious, and is now rare. The Governor General Vincent Massey, the writer and broadcaster Peter Stursberg, the actor Lorne Greene, and the actor Christopher Plummer are examples of men who were raised in Canada but spoke with a British-influenced accent.

== Spelling ==
Canadian spelling of the English language combines British and American conventions, the two dominant varieties, and adds some domestic idiosyncrasies. For many words, American and British spelling are both acceptable. Spelling in Canadian English co-varies with regional and social variables, somewhat more so, perhaps, than in the two dominant varieties of English, yet general trends have emerged since the 1970s.

- Words such as realise and organisation are usually consistent with the other Commonwealth countries, but the American spellings with a z are also used. Both spellings are listed as acceptable in The Canadian Oxford Dictionary.
- Words such as anesthesia and gynecology are usually or more commonly spelled as in American English rather than anaesthesia and gynaecology as in British English. However, words such as gynaecology and paediatric are used by Canadian journals and organizations such as JOGC (The Journal of Obstetrics and Gynaecology Canada) and Canadian Paediatric Society.
- French-derived words that in American English end with -or usually take the suffix -our but may also end with -or; thus both colour and color are acceptable.
- French-derived words that in American English end with -er, such as fiber or center, usually end with -re (fibre and centre). However, -er endings are also acceptable, provided that consistency is maintained.
- While the United States uses the Anglo-French spelling defense and offense (noun), most Canadians use the British spellings defence and offence.
- Some nouns, as in British English, take -ce while corresponding verbs take -se – for example, practice and licence are nouns while practise and license are the respective corresponding verbs.
- Canadian spelling sometimes retains the British practice of doubling the consonant -l- when adding suffixes to words even when the final syllable (before the suffix) is not stressed. Compare Canadian (and British) cancelled, counsellor, and travelling (more often than not in Canadian while always doubled in British) to American canceled, counselor, and traveling (fueled, fuelled, dueling and duelling are all common). In American English, this consonant is only doubled when stressed; thus, for instance, controllable and enthralling are universal. (But both Canadian and British English use balloted and profiting.)
- In other cases, Canadian and American usage differs from British spelling, such as in the case of nouns like curb and tire (of a wheel), which in British English are spelled kerb and tyre. (But tire in the sense of "make or become weary" is universal.) Some other differences like Canadian and American aluminum versus aluminium elsewhere correspond to different pronunciations.

Canadian spelling conventions can be partly explained by Canada's trade history. For instance, Canada's automobile industry has been dominated by American firms from its inception, explaining why Canadians use the American spelling of tire (hence, "Canadian Tire") and American terminology for automobiles and their parts (for example, truck instead of lorry, gasoline instead of petrol, trunk instead of boot).

Canada's political history has also had an influence on Canadian spelling. Canada's first prime minister, John A. Macdonald, once advised the Governor General of Canada to issue an order-in-council directing that government papers be written in the British style.

A contemporary reference for formal Canadian spelling is the spelling used for Hansard transcripts of the Parliament of Canada. Many Canadian editors, though, use the Canadian Oxford Dictionary, often along with the chapter on spelling in Editing Canadian English, and, where necessary (depending on context), one or more other references.

Throughout part of the 20th century, some Canadian newspapers adopted American spellings, for example, color as opposed to the British-based colour. Some of the most substantial historical spelling data can be found in Dollinger (2010) and Grue (2013). The use of such spellings was the long-standing practice of the Canadian Press perhaps since that news agency's inception, but visibly the norm prior to World War II. The practice of dropping the letter u in such words was also considered a labour-saving technique during the early days of printing in which movable type was set manually. Canadian newspapers also received much of their international content from American press agencies, so it was much easier for editorial staff to leave the spellings from the wire services as provided.

In the 1990s, Canadian newspapers began to adopt the British spelling variants such as -our endings, notably with The Globe and Mail changing its spelling policy in October 1990. Other Canadian newspapers adopted similar changes later that decade, such as the Southam newspaper chain's conversion in September 1998. The Toronto Star adopted this new spelling policy in September 1997 after that publication's ombudsman discounted the issue earlier in 1997. The Star had always avoided using recognized Canadian spelling, citing the Gage Canadian Dictionary in their defence. Controversy around this issue was frequent. When the Gage Dictionary finally adopted standard Canadian spelling, the Star followed suit. Some publishers, e.g. Maclean's, continue to prefer American spellings.

== Standardization, codification and dictionaries ==
The first series of dictionaries of Canadian English was published by Gage Ltd. under the chief-editorships of Charles J. Lovell and Walter S. Avis as of 1960 and the "Big Six" editors plus Faith Avis. The Beginner's Dictionary (1962), the Intermediate Dictionary (1964) and, finally, the Senior Dictionary (1967) were milestones in Canadian English lexicography. In November 1967 A Dictionary of Canadianisms on Historical Principles (DCHP) was published and completed the first edition of Gage's Dictionary of Canadian English Series. The DCHP documents the historical development of Canadian English words that can be classified as "Canadianisms". It therefore includes words such as mukluk, Canuck, and bluff, but does not list common core words such as desk, table or car. Many secondary schools in Canada use the graded dictionaries. The dictionaries have regularly been updated since: the Senior Dictionary, edited by Robert John Gregg, was renamed Gage Canadian Dictionary. Its fifth edition was printed beginning in 1997. Gage was acquired by Thomson Nelson around 2003. The latest editions were published in 2009 by HarperCollins. On 17 March 2017 a second edition of DCHP, the online Dictionary of Canadianisms on Historical Principles 2 (DCHP-2), was published. DCHP-2 incorporates the c. 10 000 lexemes from DCHP-1 and adds c. 1 300 novel meanings or 1 002 lexemes to the documented lexicon of Canadian English.

In 1998, Oxford University Press produced a Canadian English dictionary, after five years of lexicographical research, entitled The Oxford Canadian Dictionary. A second edition, retitled The Canadian Oxford Dictionary, was published in 2004. Just as the older dictionaries it includes uniquely Canadian words and words borrowed from other languages, and surveyed spellings, such as whether colour or color was the more popular choice in common use. Paperback and concise versions (2005, 2006), with minor updates, are available.

Since 2022, the Editors' Association of Canada has been leading the writing of a new Canadian English Dictionary within a national dictionary Consortium. The Consortium comprises the Editors' Association of Canada, the UBC Canadian English Lab, and Queen's University's Strategy Language Unit.

== Phonology and phonetics ==
It is quite common for Canadian English speakers to have the cot–caught merger, the father–bother merger, the low-back-merger shift (with the vowel in words such as "trap" moving backwards), Canadian raising (words such as "like" and "about" pronounced with a higher first vowel in the diphthong) and no trap-bath split. Canadian raising is when the onsets of diphthongs /aɪ/ and /aʊ/ get raised to [ə] or [ʌ] before voiceless segments. There are areas in the eastern US where some words are pronounced with Canadian raising.

Some young Canadians may show goose-fronting. US southern dialects have long had goose-fronting, but this goose-fronting among young Canadians and Californians is more recent. Some young Californians also show signs of the low-back-merger shift. The cot–caught merger is perhaps not general in the US, but younger speakers seem more likely to have it.

Pure vowels (monophthongs) of a Standard Canadian English speaker in Toronto on a vowel chart, from Tse (2018:141). It shows the Canadian Shift from [ɪ, ɛ, æ] towards [ɘ, ɛ̠, ä] as well as the cot-caught merger towards a rounded open back vowel [ɒ].

In terms of the major sound systems (phonologies) of English around the world, Canadian English aligns most closely to American English. Some dialectologists group Canadian and American English together under a common North American English sound system. The mainstream Canadian accent ("Standard Canadian") is often compared to the General American accent, a middle ground lacking in noticeable regional features.

Western Canada (British Columbia, Alberta, Saskatchewan, Manitoba) shows the largest dialect diversity. Northern Canada is, according to William Labov, a dialect region in formation where a homogeneous English dialect has not yet formed. Labov's research focused on urban areas, and did not survey the country, but they found similarities among the English spoken in Ottawa, Toronto, Calgary, Edmonton and Vancouver. Labov identifies an "Inland Canada" region that concentrates all of the defining features of the dialect centred on the Prairies (a region in Western Canada that mainly includes Alberta, Saskatchewan, and Manitoba and is known for its grasslands and plains), with more variable patterns including the metropolitan areas of Vancouver and Toronto. This dialect forms a dialect continuum with Western US English, sharply differentiated from Inland Northern US English of the central and eastern Great Lakes region where the Northern Cities Shift is sending front vowels in the opposite direction to the Low-Back-Merger Shift heard in Canada and California.

=== Standard ===
Standard Canadian English is socially defined. It is spoken by those who live in urban Canada, in a middle-class job (or one of their parents holds such employment), who are second generation or later (born and raised in Canada) and speak English as (one of their) dominant language(s) (Dollinger 2019a, adapted from Chambers 1998). It is the variety spoken, in Chambers' (1998: 252) definition, by Anglophone or multilingual residents, who are second generation or later (i.e. born in Canada) and who live in urban settings. Applying this definition, c. 36% of the Canadian population speak Standard Canadian English in the 2006 population, with 38% in the 2011 census.

=== Regional variation ===
The literature has for a long time conflated the notions of Standard Canadian English (StCE) and regional variation. While some regional dialects are close to Standard Canadian English, they are not identical to it. To the untrained ear, for instance, a BC middle-class speaker from a rural setting may seemingly be speaking Standard Canadian English, but, given Chambers' definition, such a person, because of the rural provenance, would not be included in the accepted definition (see the previous section). The Atlas of North American English, while being the best source for US regional variation, is not a good source for Canadian regional variation, as its analysis is based on only 33 Canadian speakers. Boberg's studies offer the best data for the delimitation of dialect zones. The results for vocabulary and phonetics overlap to a great extent, which has allowed the proposal of dialect zones. Dollinger and Clarke distinguish between:

- West (B.C., Alberta, Saskatchewan, Manitoba; with B.C. a sub-zone on the lexical level)
- Ontario (with Northwestern Ontario a transition zone with the West)
- Quebec (concerning the c. 500 ,000 Anglophone speakers in the province, not the Francophone speakers of English)
- Maritimes (PEI, NS, NB, with PEI a subgroup on the lexical level)
- Newfoundland

==== Indigenous ====
The words Aboriginal and Indigenous are capitalized when used in a Canadian context.

First Nations and Inuit from Northern Canada speak a version of Canadian English influenced by the phonology of their first languages. Non-indigenous Canadians in these regions are relatively recent arrivals, and have not produced a dialect that is distinct from southern Canadian English.

Overall, First Nations Canada English dialects rest between language loss and language revitalization. British Columbia has the greatest linguistic diversity, as it is home to about half of the Indigenous languages spoken in Canada. Most of the languages spoken in the province are endangered due to the small number of speakers. To some extent, the dialects reflect the historical contexts where English has been a major colonizing language. The dialects are also a result of the late stages of depidginization and decreolization, which resulted in linguistic markers of Indigenous identity and solidarity. These dialects are observed to have developed a lingua franca due to the contact between English and Indigenous populations, and eventually, the various dialects began to converge with standard English.

Certain First Nations English have also shown to have phonological standard Canadian English, thus resulting in a more distinct dialect formation. Plains Cree, for instance, is a language that has less phonological contrasts compared to standard Canadian English. Plains Cree has no voicing contrast. The stops /p/, /t/, and /k/ are mostly voiceless and unaspirated, though they may vary in other phonetic environments from voiceless to voiced. Plains Cree also does not have the liquids or fricatives found in the standard form. Dene Suline, on the other hand, has more phonological contrasts, resulting in the use of features not seen in the standard form. The language has 39 phonemic consonants and a higher proportion of glottalized consonants.

==== Maritimes ====
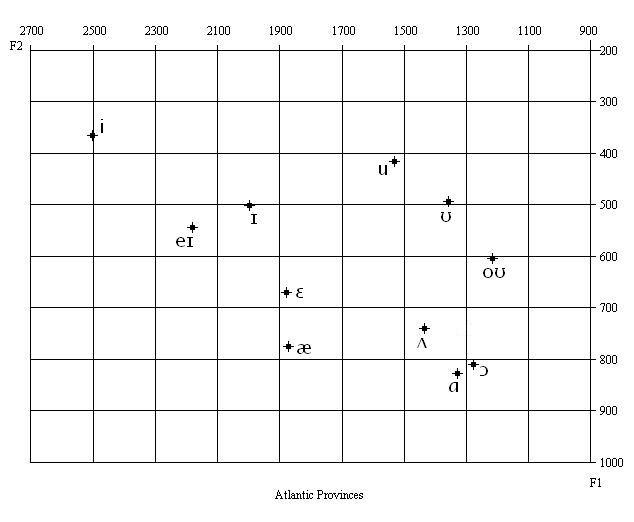
Based on Labov et al.; averaged F1/F2 means for speakers from N.S., N.B., N.L.

Many in the Maritime provinces – Nova Scotia, New Brunswick and Prince Edward Island – have an accent that sounds more like Scottish English and, in some places, Irish English than General American. Outside of major communities, dialects can vary markedly from community to community, as well as from province to province, reflecting ethnic origin as well as a past in which there were few roads and many communities, with some isolated villages. Into the 1980s, residents of villages in northern Nova Scotia could identify themselves by dialects and accents distinctive to their village. The dialects of Prince Edward Island are often considered the most distinct grouping.

The phonology of Maritimer English has some unique features:

- Cot–caught merger in effect, but toward a central vowel [ɑ̈].
- No Canadian Shift of the short front vowels
- Pre-consonantal /r/ is sometimes (though rarely) deleted.
- The flapping of intervocalic /t/ and /d/ to alveolar tap [ɾ] between vowels, as well as pronouncing it as a glottal stop [ʔ], is less common in the Maritimes. Therefore, battery is pronounced [ˈbætɹi] instead of [ˈbæɾ(ɨ)ɹi].
- Especially among the older generation, /w/ and /hw/ are not merged; that is, the beginning sound of why, white, and which is different from that of witch, with, and wear.
- Like most varieties of CanE, Maritimer English contains Canadian raising.

Nova Scotia As with many other distinct dialects, vowels are a marker of Halifax English as a distinctive variant of Canadian English. Typically, Canadian dialects have a merger of the low back vowels in palm, lot, thought and cloth. The merged vowel in question is usually /ɑ/ or sometimes the rounded variant /ɒ/. Meanwhile, in Halifax, the vowel is raised and rounded. For example, body; popped; and gone. In the homophones, caught-cot and stalk-stock, the rounding in the merged vowel is also much more pronounced here than in other Canadian varieties. The Canadian Shift is also not as evident in the traditional dialect. Instead, the front vowels are raised. For example, the vowel in had is raised to [hæed]; and camera is raised to [kæmra].

Although it has not been studied extensively, the speech of Cape Breton specifically seems to bear many similarities with the nearby island of Newfoundland, which is often why Westerners can have a hard time differentiating the two accents. For instance, they both use the fronting of the low back vowel. These similarities can be attributed to geographic proximity, the fact that about one-quarter of the Cape Breton population descends from Irish immigrants (many of whom arrived via Newfoundland) and the Scottish and Irish influences on both provinces. The speech of Cape Breton can almost be seen as a continuum between the two extremes of the Halifax variant and the Newfoundland variant. In addition, there is heavy influence of standard varieties of Canadian English on Cape Breton English, especially in the diphthongization of the goat and goose vowels and the frequent use of Canadian raising.

==== Newfoundland ====
Compared to the commonly spoken English dominating neighbouring provinces, Newfoundland English is famously distinct in its dialects and accents. Newfoundland English differs in vowel pronunciation, morphology, syntax, and preservation of archaic adverbial-intensifiers. The dialect varies markedly from community to community, as well as from region to region. Its distinctiveness partly results from a European settlement history that dates back centuries, which explains Newfoundland's most notable linguistic regions: an Irish-settled area in the southeast (the southern Avalon Peninsula) and an English-settled area in the southwest.

A well-known phonetic feature many Newfoundland speakers possess is the kit-dress merger. The mid lax /ɛ/ here is raised to the high lax stressed /ɪ/, particularly before oral stops and nasals, so consequently "pen" is pronounced more like "pin".

Another phonetic feature more unique to Newfoundland English is TH-stopping. Here, the voiceless dental fricative /θ/ in words like myth and width are pronounced more like t or the voiced dental fricative /ð/ in words like the and these. TH-stopping is more common for /ð/, especially in unstressed function words (e.g. that, those, their, etc.).

==== Ontario ====
Canadian raising is quite strong throughout the province of Ontario, except within the Ottawa Valley. The introduction of Canadian raising to Canada can be attributed to the Scottish and Irish immigrants who arrived in the 18th and 19th centuries. The origins of Canadian raising to Scotland and revealed that the Scottish dialects spoken by these immigrants had a probable impact on its development. This feature impacts the pronunciation of the /aɪ/ sound in "right" and the /aʊ/ sound in "lout". Canadian Raising indicates a scenario where the start of the diphthong is nearer to the destination of the glide before voiceless consonants than before voiced consonants. The Canadian Shift is also a common vowel shift found in Ontario. The retraction of /æ/ was found to be more advanced for women in Ontario than for people from the Prairies or Atlantic Canada and men.

In the southern part of Southwestern Ontario (roughly in the line south from Sarnia to St. Catharines), despite the existence of many characteristics of West/Central Canadian English, many speakers, especially those under 30, speak a dialect influenced by the Inland Northern American English dialect (in part due to proximity to cities like Detroit and Buffalo, New York) though there are minor differences such as Canadian raising (e.g. "ice" vs "my").

The north and northwestern parts of Southwestern Ontario, the area consisting of the Counties of Huron, Bruce, Grey, and Perth, referred to as the "Queen's Bush" in the 19th century, did not experience communication with the dialects of the southern part of Southwestern Ontario and Central Ontario until the early 20th century. Thus, a strong accent similar to Central Ontarian is heard, yet many different phrasings exist. It is typical in the area to drop phonetic sounds to make shorter contractions, such as: prolly (probably), goin' (going), and "Wuts goin' on tonight? D'ya wanna do sumthin'?" It is particularly strong in the County of Bruce, so much that it is commonly referred to as being the Bruce Cownian (Bruce Countian) accent. Also, /ɜr/ merge with /ɛr/ to [ɛɹ], with "were" sounding more like "wear".

Residents of the Golden Horseshoe (including the Greater Toronto Area) are known to merge the second /t/ with the /n/ in Toronto, pronouncing the name variously as [təˈɹɒɾ̃o] or [ˈtɹɒɾ̃o]. This is not unique to Toronto; Atlanta is often pronounced "Atlanna" by residents. Sometimes /ð/ is elided altogether, resulting in "Do you want this one er'iss one?" The word southern is sometimes pronounced with [aʊ]. In the area north of the Regional Municipality of York and south of Parry Sound, notably among those who were born in the surrounding communities, the cutting down of syllables and consonants often heard, e.g. "probably" is reduced to "prolly" or "probly" when used as a response. In Greater Toronto, the diphthong tends to be fronted (as a result the word about is pronounced as [əˈbɛʊt]). The Greater Toronto Area is linguistically diverse, with 43 percent of its people having a mother tongue other than English. As a result Toronto English has distinctly more variability than Inland Canada.

In Eastern Ontario, Canadian raising is not as strong as it is in the rest of the province. In Prescott and Russell, parts of Stormont-Dundas-Glengarry and Eastern Ottawa, French accents are often mixed with English ones due to the high Franco-Ontarian population there. In Lanark County, Western Ottawa and Leeds-Grenville and the rest of Stormont-Dundas-Glengarry, the accent spoken is nearly identical to that spoken in Central Ontario and the Quinte area.

A linguistic enclave has also formed in the Ottawa Valley, heavily influenced by original Scottish, Irish, and German settlers, and existing along the Ontario-Quebec boundary, which has its own distinct accent known as the Ottawa Valley twang (or brogue). Phonetically, the Ottawa Valley twang is characterized by the lack of Canadian raising as well as the cot–caught merger, two common elements of mainstream Canadian English. This accent is quite rare in the region today.

==== Quebec ====
English is a minority language in Quebec (with French the majority), but has many speakers in Montreal, the Eastern Townships and in the Gatineau-Ottawa region. A person whose mother tongue is English and who still speaks English is called an Anglophone, versus a Francophone, or French speaker.

Many people in Montreal distinguish between words like marry versus merry and parish versus perish, which are homophones to most other speakers of Canadian English.

==== West ====
Western Canadian English describes the English spoken in the four most western provinces—British Columbia, Alberta, Saskatchewan, and Manitoba. British Columbia, in particular is a sub-zone on the lexical level. Phonetically, Western Canadian English has much more /æɡ/ raising and much less /æn/ than further east, and Canadian raised /aʊ/ is further back.

==== British Columbia ====
British Columbia English shares dialect features with both Standard Canadian English and the American Pacific Northwest English. In Vancouver, speakers exhibit more vowel retraction of /æ/ before nasals than people from Toronto, and this retraction may become a regional marker of West Coast English. /ɛɡ/ raising (found in words such as beg, leg, and peg) and /æɡ/ raising (found words such as bag, lag and rag), a prominent feature in Northwestern American speakers, is also found in Vancouver speakers, causing "beg" to sound like the first syllable of "bagel" and "bag" to be similar. In the past, the ANAE reported that Vancouverites' participation in the Canadian raising of /aɪ/ was questionable, but nowadays they tend to raise both /aɪ/ and /aʊ/. The "o" in such words as holy, goal, load, know, etc. is pronounced as a close-mid back rounded vowel, [o], but not as rounded as in the Prairies where there are strong Scandinavian, Slavic and German influences, which can lend to a more stereotypical "Canadian" accent.

Finally, similarly to the prince-prints merger, there is also the /t/ sound which according to Gregg (2016), "with many [Vancouver] speakers [is] intrusive between /l/ or /n/ and /s/ in words like sense /sɛnts/, Wilson /wɪltsən/ [and] also /'ɒltsoʊ/ ".

==== Saskatchewan ====
English in Saskatchewan has its pool of phonetic features shared with other provinces used by certain demographics. For instance, it has the consonant variables /ntV/ and /VtV/, the latter being a common feature of North American English and is defined as the intervoicing of /t/ between vowels. Meanwhile, /ntV/ "frequently occurs in words such as "centre" and "twenty" where /t/ follows the alveolar nasal /n/ and precedes an unstressed vowel". According to Nylvek (1992), both variables of /t/ are generally more often used by younger male over older female speakers.

== Grammar ==
There are a handful of syntactical practices unique to Canadian English. When writing, Canadians may start a sentence with As well, in the sense of "in addition"; this construction is a Canadianism.

North American English prefers have got to have to denote possession or obligation (as in I've got a car vs. I have a car); Canadian English differs from American English in tending to eschew plain got (I got a car), which is a common third option in informal US English.

The grammatical construction "be done something" means roughly "have/has finished something". For example, "I am done my homework" and "The dog is done dinner" are genuine sentences in this dialect, respectively meaning "I have finished my homework" and "The dog has finished dinner". Another example, "Let's start after you're done all the coffee", means "Let's start after you've finished all the coffee". This is not exactly the same as the standard construction "to be done with something", since "She is done the computer" can only mean "She is done with the computer" in one sense: "She has finished (building) the computer".

=== Date and time notation ===
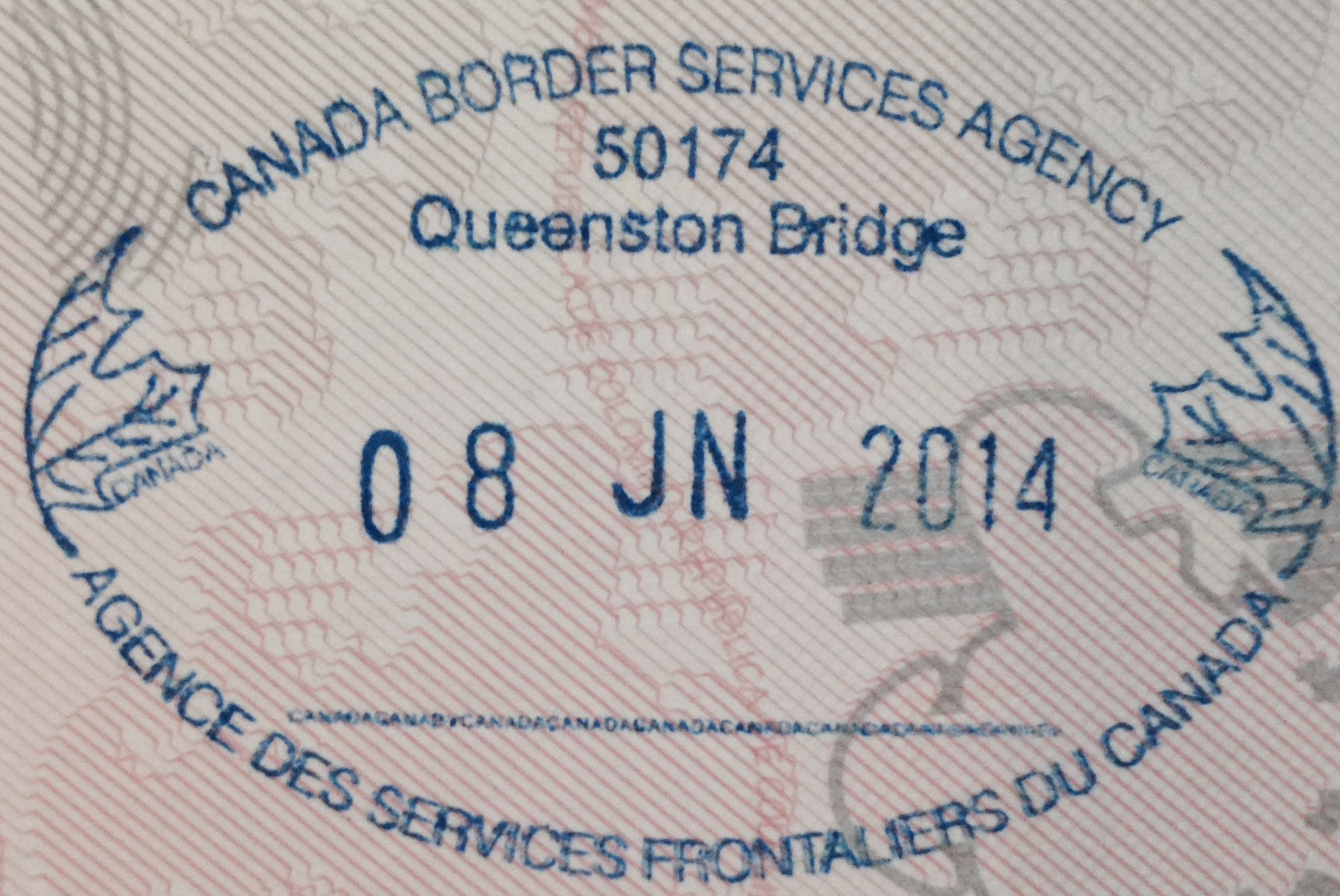
Canadian passport stamp from Queenston Bridge, showing the date 8 June 2014

Date and time notation in Canadian English is a mixture of British and American practices. The date can be written in the form of either "July 1, 2017" or "1 July 2017"; the latter is common in more formal writing and bilingual contexts. The Government of Canada only recommends writing all-numeric dates in the form of YYYY-MM-DD (e.g. 2017-07-01), following ISO 8601. Nonetheless, the traditional DD/MM/YY and MM/DD/YY systems remain in everyday use, which can be interpreted in multiple ways: 01/07/17 can mean either 1 July 2017 or 7 January 2017. Private members' bills have repeatedly attempted to clarify the situation.

The government also recommends use of the 24-hour clock, which is widely used in contexts such as transportation schedules, parking meters, and data transmission. Many English speakers use the 12-hour clock in everyday speech, even when reading from a 24-hour display.

== Vocabulary ==
Where Canadian English shares vocabulary with other English dialects, it tends to share most with American English, but also has many non-American terms distinctively shared instead with Britain. British and American terms also can coexist in Canadian English to various extents, sometimes with new nuances in meaning; a classic example is holiday (British) often used interchangeably with vacation (American), though, in Canadian speech, the latter can more narrowly mean a trip elsewhere and the former can mean general time off work. In addition, the vocabulary of Canadian English also features some words that are seldom (if ever) found elsewhere. A good resource for these and other words is A Dictionary of Canadianisms on Historical Principles, which is currently being revised at the University of British Columbia in Vancouver, British Columbia. The Canadian public appears to take interest in unique "Canadianisms": words that are distinctively characteristic of Canadian English—though perhaps not exclusive to Canada; there is some disagreement about the extent to which "Canadianism" means a term actually unique to Canada, with such an understanding possibly overstated by the popular media. As a member of the Commonwealth of Nations, Canada shares many items of institutional terminology and professional designations with the countries of the former British Empire—for example, constable, for a police officer of the lowest rank, and chartered accountant.

=== Regional variation ===
While Canadian English has vocabulary that distinguishes it from other varieties of English across the world, there is significant regional variation in its lexis within Canada as well. A balanced cross-continental sample of 1800 Canadians and 360 Americans the Canada and the USA is the result of Boberg's North American Regional Vocabulary Survey (NARVS), a questionnaire employed by Boberg from 1999–2007 that sought out lexical items that vary regionally within Canada. Six regions were identified in the NARVS data collection: The West, which includes British Columbia and the Prairies; Ontario; Quebec, which represents data from Montreal mostly; New Brunswick and Nova Scotia; Prince Edward Island; and Newfoundland. Many regional differences in the lexis are item-specific. For example, one of these items is the term used to refer to a pizza with all available toppings. While Atlantic Canada refers to this order as ‘the works', the majority term used from eastern Ontario to the West Coast is 'deluxe', and terms such as 'all-dressed' and 'everything-on-it' are used in Quebec and Toronto, respectively. Other examples include the regionally varied usage of 'running shoes'/'runners'/'sneakers' to describe athletic shoes, and 'notebook'/'scribbler'/'cahier' to describe any type of plain note-pad. Despite the regional variation of vocabulary items within Canada, the lexis of Canadian English still maintains greater commonality between its own regions than it does with American English or British English.

==== Quebec ====
Quebec recognizes French as its primary language. As a result, English has no official status in Quebec and is not used often in the public sphere. Although, in more metropolitan areas such as Montreal or Quebec City, it is not uncommon to see English media in public, such as in advertisements and store-fronts. Also, the provincial government must officially be referred to as the "Gouvernement du Québec", regardless of the language being used by the speaker. The francophone dominance in Quebec makes the province a linguistic anomaly within Canada, where English maintains a negligible role in government and public domains.

While the lexical catalog of Quebec English contains items influenced or borrowed from French, the influence of the dominant French language on Quebec English is marginal. The influence operates through five distinct processes, as identified by Charles Boberg:

1. Elective direct lexical transfer of non-English words (e.g., garderie for daycare)
2. Imposed direct lexical transfer of non-English words, for example, SAQ for Société des alcools du Québec
3. Loan translation/calques such as "all-dressed" for the French equivalent "toute garnie"
4. Semantic shifts of existing English words, like "magasin" for "store"
5. Syntactic influences, e.g. "we're living here three years" instead of the English "we've been living here for three years"

Although Quebec English differs from other Canadian regional lexes due to its special contact with French, it still shares some similarities with the lexis of other Canadian regions. For instance, the use of lexical items such as all-dressed has been successfully transferred to most other Canadian regional lexes.

Words used mainly in Quebec and especially in Montreal are: stage for "apprenticeship" or "internship", copybook for a notebook, dépanneur or dep for a convenience store, and guichet for an ABM/ATM. It is also common for Anglophones, particularly those of Greek or Italian descent, to use translated French words instead of common English equivalents such as "open" and "close" for "on" and "off" or "Open the lights, please" for "Turn on the lights, please".

==== Ontario ====
Southern Ontario was initially settled by white Protestants, with the late 19th century witnessing the migration of white Protestant settlers from Ontario to western Canada following the suppression of the Métis opposition. This migration facilitated the transplantation of the Ontario accent and the emergence of a homogeneous Canadian English dialect. Distinctive to Ontario are Canadianisms such as concession roads, which refer to roads that transect a township, dew-worm, which refers to an earthworm, and fire-reel, which refers to a fire truck. Walter S. Avis identified several linguistic features characteristic of Ontarians, including their preference for the word vacation, rather than holiday—which is considered more British English—and sack over paper bag. While there may be numerous such lexical differences in the speech of provincial and national borderers, Avis asserts that these are relatively minor compared to the linguistic features held in common. Furthermore, Avis suggests that the difference between American English and Ontario English is relatively small near the border due to their close proximity. The historical settlement patterns of southern Ontario, coupled with linguistic research, indicate the existence of distinctively Ontarian lexical items. However, Ontario maintains greater similarities with other Canadian regions than it does with the neighbouring American English and its regional variations.

Northern Ontario English has several distinct qualities stemming from its large Franco-Ontarian population. As a result several French and English words are used interchangeably. A number of phrases and expressions may also be found in Northern Ontario that are not present in the rest of the province, such as the use of camp for a summer home where Southern Ontario speakers would idiomatically use cottage.

In the mid to late 90s, certain words from Jamaican Patois, Arabic and Somali were incorporated into the local variety of English by Toronto youth, especially in immigrant communities, thus giving rise to Toronto slang. These examples included words such as mandem, styll, wallahi, wasteman, and yute.

==== Prairies (Manitoba, Saskatchewan and Alberta) ====
The Prairies, consisting of Manitoba, Saskatchewan, and Alberta, have their own lexical features. The linguistic legacy from the settlement patterns in these regions, along with the Indigenous communities, specifically the large Métis population in Saskatchewan and Manitoba also carry certain linguistic traits inherited from the French, Indigenous, and Celtic forebears. The linguistic features brought by Ukrainian, German, and Mennonite populations in the Saskatchewan Valley of Saskatchewan and Red River Valley of Manitoba have also influenced the lexis of the Prairies. Some terms are derived from these groups and some are formed within the region by locals throughout time. An example of the former is the high-profile variable bunnyhug, a term for a hooded sweatshirt in Saskatchewan. As discussed in The Dictionary of Canadianisms on Historical Principles, bunnyhug is purposely and commonly used by young Saskatchewan speakers to indicate a sense of provincial identity, and is referred to as a Saskatchewanism. It should be further noted that it is assumed based on circumstantial evidence that teenagers played a crucial and special role in the spread and adoption of the term bunnyhug for hooded sweatshirts. Across Saskatchewan, Alberta, and Manitoba there are other terms consistent in or throughout the 3 provinces. Biffed is a term for falling, such as "John biffed it over there". Pickerel is Manitoba's official fish, also known as Walleye. Play structure is used to describe a playground for children consisting of monkey bars, slides, etc.

==== Atlantic Canada (New Brunswick & Nova Scotia, PEI, Newfoundland) ====
Canada's Atlantic provinces were the first part of North America to be explored by Europeans. The Atlantic provinces, historically and collectively called the Maritimes, consist of New Brunswick, Nova Scotia, Prince Edward Island. Newfoundland and Labrador, which is not part of the Maritimes, is also part of Atlantic Canada. The historical immigrants from Europe have shaped cultures and lexical catalogs across the regions of Atlantic Canada that reflect British, Scottish, Gaelic, and French customs. The vernacular variations of English spoken in the Atlantic region of Canada. Newfoundland and Labrador English (NLE) possesses unique vocabulary compared to standard Canadian English. The Dictionary of Newfoundland English covers the vocabulary common to Newfoundlanders, such as Newfoundland "screech rum", a Newfoundland-specific brand of rum; mummering, referring to a Christmas tradition; and gut-foundered, meaning starving or fastened. Nova Scotia also is home to its own vocabulary. The term "Sobeys bag", used to refer to a plastic grocery bag, originates from the Nova Scotian grocery store chain Sobeys. Similarly, Prince Edward Island has its own vocabulary and dictionary. For example, angishore refers to a fisherman who is too lazy to fish and likely is a lexical item originating from Irish Gaelic settlers in Newfoundland. Sarah Sawler, a writer from Halifax, highlights terms that are common to the Maritimes, such as dooryard for front yard, owly for when someone is angry or irritable, and biff for throw.

=== Education ===
The term college, which refers to post-secondary education in general in the US, refers in Canada to either a post-secondary technical or vocational institution, or to one of the colleges that exist as federated schools within some Canadian universities. Most often, a college is a community college, not a university. It may also refer to a CEGEP in Quebec. In Canada, college student might denote someone obtaining a diploma in business management, graphic design, or nursing - an equivalent of this would be an associate degree in the United States (though "associate diplomas" may also be offered by some universities). In contrast, university student is the term for someone earning a bachelor's degree, typically at a post-secondary university institution. Hence, the term going to college in Canada does not have the same meaning as going to university, unless the speaker or context clarifies the specific level of post-secondary education that is meant.

Within the public school system the chief administrator of a school is generally "the principal", as in the United States, but the term is not used preceding their name, i.e., "Principal Smith". The assistant to the principal is not titled as "assistant principal", but rather as "vice-principal", although the former is not unknown. This usage is identical to that in Northern Ireland. In higher education, the head of an institution is "the president", though "principal" may also be used. Many universities will often have a "chancellor", however this is principally a ceremonial role and typically does not confer administrative authority.

Canadian universities publish calendars or schedules, not catalogs as in the US. Canadian students write or take exams (in the US, students generally "take" exams while teachers "write" them); they rarely sit them (standard British usage). Those who supervise students during an exam are sometimes called invigilators as in Britain, or sometimes proctors as in the US; usage may depend on the region or even the individual institution.

Successive years of school are usually referred to as grade one, grade two, and so on. In Quebec, Francophone speakers will often say primary one, primary two as a direct translation from the French, and so on; while Anglophones will say grade one, grade two. These terms are comparable with the American first grade, second grade , English/Welsh Year 1, Year 2, Scottish/Northern Irish Primary 1, Primary 2 or P1, P2, and Southern Irish First Class, Second Class and so on. The year of school before grade 1 is usually called "Kindergarten", with the exception of Nova Scotia, where it is called "grade primary". In addition, children younger than the public school start age may attend "pre-primary", although this is a newer addition to the Nova Scotian public-school system, and is not used frequently elsewhere.

In parts of the US, the four years of high school are termed the freshman, sophomore, junior, and senior years (terms also used for college years); in Canada, the specific levels are used instead, such as "grade nine" in lieu of freshman. As for higher education, only the term freshman (often reduced to frosh) has some currency in Canada. Moreover, some Canadian public-school systems have adolescents start high-school in "Grade 10" or, the sophomore year, although, this can depend on the province and even vary within a school-district. The American usages "sophomore", "junior" and "senior" are not used in Canadian university terminology, or in speech. The specific high-school grades and university years are therefore stated and individualized; for example, "Sarah is starting Grade 10 this year", which Americans would state as "Sarah is going to be a sophomore this year". Similarly in the post-secondary education context, "Francois is in his second year of university" rather than the Americanism "Francois is a sophomore in college".

Canadian students use the term marks (more common in England) or grades (more common in the US) to refer to their results. Usage is mixed, although marks more commonly refer to a single score whereas grades often refers to the cumulative score in that class.

=== Units of measurement ===
Unlike in the United States, use of metric units within a majority of industries is standard in Canada, as a result of the partial national adoption of the metric system during the mid-to-late 1970s that was eventually stalled; this has spawned some colloquial usages such as klick for kilometre.

Nonetheless, US units are still used in many situations. Imperial volumes are also used, albeit rarely—although many Canadians and Americans mistakenly conflate the measurement systems despite their slight differences from each other (e.g. US, Canadian, and metric cups are 237 ml, 227 ml, and 250 mL respectively).

For example, most English Canadians state their weight and height in pounds and feet/inches, respectively. This is also the case for many Quebec Francophones. Distances while playing golf are always marked and discussed in yards, though official scorecards may also show metres. Temperatures for cooking or pools are often given in Fahrenheit, while the weather is given in Celsius. Directions in the Prairie provinces are sometimes given using miles, because the country roads generally follow the mile-based grid of the Dominion Land Survey. Motor vehicle speed limits are measured in kilometres per hour.

Canadians often measure distance in units of time when speaking, for example, saying a location is thirty minutes away when asked how far, rather than the actual distance.

Canadians measure floor areas, both residential and commercial, in square feet or square metres. Land area is in square feet, square metres, acres or hectares. Fuel efficiency is more often discussed in the metric L/100 km than miles per US gallon. The Letter paper size of 8.5 inches × 11 inches is used instead of the international and metric equivalent A4 size of 210 mm × 297 mm. Beer cans are 355 mL (12 US oz), while beer bottles are typically 341 mL (12 Imperial oz), and draft beer is sold in various units; US or Imperial oz, US or Imperial pint, or occasionally mL.

Building materials are used in soft conversions of imperial sizes, but often purchased in relation to the imperial sizes. For example, 8-inch concrete masonry units can be referred to as an 8-inch CMU or 190 CMU. The actual material used in the US and Canada is the same.

=== Transport ===
- Although Canadian lexicon features both railway and railroad, railway is the usual term in naming (witness Canadian National Railway and Canadian Pacific Railway), though railroad can be heard fairly frequently in some regions; most rail terminology in Canada follows American usage (for example, ties and cars rather than sleepers and carriages).
- A two-way ticket can be either a round-trip (American term) or a return (British term).
- The terms highway (for example, Trans-Canada Highway), expressway (Central Canada, as in the Gardiner Expressway) and freeway (Sherwood Park Freeway, Edmonton) are often used to describe various high-speed roads with varying levels of access control. Generally, but not exclusively, highway refers to any provincially funded road regardless of its access control. Often such roads will be numbered. Similar to the US, the terms expressway and freeway are often used interchangeably to refer to controlled-access highways, that is, divided highways with access only at grade-separated interchanges (for example, a 400-Series Highway in Ontario).

Expressway may also refer to a limited-access road that has control of access but has at-grade junctions, railway crossings (for example, the Harbour Expressway in Thunder Bay). Sometimes the term Parkway is also used (for example, the Hanlon Parkway in Guelph). In Saskatchewan, the term "grid road" is used to refer to minor highways or rural roads, usually gravel, referring to the "grid" upon which they were originally designed – in rural Ontario, this type of road may also be referred to as a "concession". In Quebec, freeways and expressways are called autoroutes.

In Alberta, the generic Trail is often used to describe a freeway, expressway or major urban street (for example, Deerfoot Trail, Macleod Trail or Crowchild Trail in Calgary, Yellowhead Trail, Victoria Trail or Mark Messier/St.Albert Trail in Edmonton). The British term motorway is not used. The American terms turnpike and tollway for a toll road are not common. The term throughway or thruway was used for first tolled limited-access highways (for example, the Deas Island Throughway, now Highway 99, from Vancouver, BC, to Blaine, Washington, US, or the Saint John Throughway (Highway 1) in Saint John, New Brunswick), but this term is not common anymore. In everyday speech, when a particular roadway is not being specified, the term highway is generally or exclusively used.

- A railway at-grade junction can be called a level crossing, as well as the term grade crossing, which is commonly used in the US.
- A railway or highway crossing overhead is an overpass or underpass, depending on which part of the crossing is referred to (the two are used more or less interchangeably); the British term flyover is sometimes used, as is subway.
- In Quebec, English speakers often use the word "metro" to mean subway. Non-native Anglophones of Quebec will also use the designated proper title "Metro" to describe the Montreal subway system.
- The term Texas gate refers to the type of metal grid called a cattle guard in American English or a cattle grid in British English.
- Depending on the region, large trucks used to transport and deliver goods are referred to as "transport trucks" (e.g., used in Ontario and Alberta) or "transfer trucks" (e.g., used in Prince Edward Island)

=== Politics ===
- While in standard usage the terms prime minister and premier are interchangeable terms for the head of an elected parliamentary government, Canadian English today generally follows a usage convention of reserving the title prime minister for the federal first minister and referring to provincial or territorial leaders as premiers. Because Canadian French does not have separate terms for the two positions, using premier ministre for both, the title prime minister is sometimes seen in reference to a provincial leader when a Francophone is speaking or writing English. Also, until the 1970s the leader of the Ontario provincial government was officially styled prime minister.
- When a majority of the elected members of the House of Commons or a provincial legislature are not members of the same party as the government, the situation is referred to as a minority government rather than a hung Parliament.
- To table a document in Canadian, in parliamentary usage, is to introduce or present it (as in Britain), whereas in the US it means to postpone consideration until a later date, often indefinitely. While the introduction meaning is the most common sense in non-parliamentary usage, the presentation meaning is also used in Canada. The Canadian Oxford Dictionary simply recommends avoiding the term in non-parliamentary context.
- In Canada, a committee is struck, whereas in the US committees are appointed, formed, or created, etc.
- Several political terms are more in use in Canada than elsewhere, including riding (as a general term for a parliamentary constituency or electoral district, this term is unique to Canada). The term reeve was at one time common for the equivalent of a mayor in some smaller municipalities in British Columbia and Ontario, but is now falling into disuse. The title is still used for the leader of a rural municipality in Saskatchewan, parts of Alberta, and Manitoba.
- The term Tory, used in Britain with a similar meaning, denotes a supporter of the present-day federal Conservative Party of Canada, the historic federal or provincial Progressive Conservative Party. The term Red Tory is also used to denote the more socially liberal wings of the Tory parties. Blue Tory is less commonly used, and refers to more strict fiscal (rather than social) conservatism. The use of Tory to mean a Loyalist in the time of the American Revolution is an American usage. The Canadian term is simply Loyalist.
- Members of the Liberal Party of Canada or a provincial Liberal party are sometimes referred to as Grits. Historically, the term comes from the phrase Clear Grit, used in Victorian times in Canada to denote an object of quality or a truthful person. The term was assumed as a nickname by Liberals by the 1850s.
- Members of the New Democratic Party (NDP) are sometimes nicknamed dippers (a clipped and altered form of NDPer) or New Democrats
- Members of the Bloc Québécois are sometimes referred to as Bloquistes. At the purely provincial level, members of Quebec's Parti Québécois are often referred to as Péquistes, and members of the Quebec provincial Action démocratique du Québec as Adéquistes.
- The term "Socred" is no longer common due to its namesake party's decline, but referred to members of the Social Credit Party, and was particularly common in British Columbia. It was not used for Social Credit members from Quebec, nor generally used for the federal caucus of that party; in both cases Créditiste, the French term, was used in English.
- Members of the Senate are referred to by the title "Senator" preceding their name, as in the United States. Members of the House of Commons of Canada, following British parliamentary nomenclature, are termed "Members of Parliament", and are referred to as "Jennifer Jones, MP" during their term of office only. Senators and members of the Privy Council are styled "The Honourable" for life, and the Prime Minister of Canada is styled "The Right Honourable" for life, as is the Chief Justice of the Supreme Court and the Governor General. This honorific may also be bestowed by Parliament, as it was to retiring deputy prime minister Herb Gray in 1996. Members of provincial legislatures do not have a pre-nominal style, except in certain provinces, such as Nova Scotia where members of the King's Executive Council of Nova Scotia are styled "The Honourable" for life, and are entitled to the use of the post-nominal letters "ECNS". The Cabinet of Ontario serves concurrently (and not for life) as the Executive Council of Ontario, while serving members are styled "The Honourable", but are not entitled to post-nominal letters.
- Members of provincial/territorial legislative assemblies are called MLAs in all provinces and territories except: Ontario, where they have been called Members of Provincial Parliament (MPPs) since 1938; Quebec, where they have been called Members of the National Assembly (MNAs) since 1968; and Newfoundland and Labrador, where they are called Members of the House of Assembly (MHAs). Each abbreviation is used as a post-nominal during terms of office only.

=== Law ===
Lawyers in all parts of Canada, except Quebec, which has its own civil law system, are called "barristers and solicitors" because any lawyer licensed in any of the common law provinces and territories must pass bar exams for, and is permitted to engage in, both types of legal practice in contrast to other common-law jurisdictions such as England, Wales and Ireland where the two are traditionally separated (i.e., Canada has a fused legal profession). The words lawyer and counsel (not counsellor) predominate in everyday contexts; the word attorney refers to any personal representative. Canadian lawyers generally do not refer to themselves as "attorneys", a term that is common in the United States.

The equivalent of an American district attorney, meaning the barrister representing the state in criminal proceedings, is called a crown attorney (in Ontario), crown counsel (in British Columbia), crown prosecutor or the crown, on account of Canada's status as a constitutional monarchy in which the Crown is the locus of state power.

The words advocate and notary – two distinct professions in Quebec civil law – are used to refer to that province's approximate equivalents of barrister and solicitor, respectively. It is not uncommon for English-speaking advocates in Quebec to refer to themselves in English as "barrister(s) and solicitor(s)", as most advocates chiefly perform what would traditionally be known as "solicitor's work", while only a minority of advocates actually appear in court. In Canada's common law provinces and territories, the word notary means strictly a notary public.

Within the Canadian legal community itself, the word solicitor is often used to refer to any Canadian lawyer in general (much like the way the word attorney is used in the United States to refer to any American lawyer in general). Despite the conceptual distinction between barrister and solicitor, Canadian court documents would contain a phrase such as "John Smith, solicitor for the Plaintiff" even though "John Smith" may well himself be the barrister who argues the case in court. In a letter introducing him/herself to an opposing lawyer, a Canadian lawyer normally writes something like "I am the solicitor for Mr. Tom Jones."

The word litigator is also used by lawyers to refer to a fellow lawyer who specializes in lawsuits even though the more traditional word barrister is still employed to denote the same specialization.

Judges of Canada's superior courts, which exist at the provincial and territorial levels, are traditionally addressed as "My Lord" or "My Lady". This varies by jurisdiction, and some superior court judges prefer the titles "Mister Justice" or "Madam Justice" to "Lordship".

Masters are addressed as "Mr. Master" or simply "Sir." In British Columbia, masters are addressed as "Your Honour."

Judges of provincial or inferior courts are traditionally referred to in person as "Your Honour". Judges of the Supreme Court of Canada and of the federal-level courts prefer the use of "Mister/Madam (Chief) Justice". Justices of The Peace are addressed as "Your Worship". "Your Honour" is also the correct form of address for a Lieutenant Governor.

A serious crime is called an indictable offence, while a less-serious crime is called a summary conviction offence. The older words felony and misdemeanour, which are still used in the United States, are not used in Canada's current Criminal Code (R.S.C. 1985, c. C-46) or by today's Canadian legal system. As noted throughout the Criminal Code, a person accused of a crime is called the accused and not the defendant, a term used instead in civil lawsuits.

In Canada, visible minority refers to a non-aboriginal person or group visibly not one of the majority race in a given population. The term comes from the Canadian Employment Equity Act, which defines such people as "persons, other than Aboriginal people, who are non-Caucasian in race or non-white in colour." The term is used as a demographic category by Statistics Canada. The qualifier "visible" is used to distinguish such minorities from the "invisible" minorities determined by language (English vs. French) and certain distinctions in religion (Catholics vs. Protestants).

A county in British Columbia means only a regional jurisdiction of the courts and justice system and is not otherwise connected to governance as with counties in other provinces and in the United States. The rough equivalent to "county" as used elsewhere is a "Regional District".

=== Places ===
Distinctive Canadianisms are:

- bachelor: bachelor apartment, an apartment all in a single room, with a small bathroom attached ("They have a bachelor for rent"). The usual American term is studio. In Quebec, this is known as a one-and-a-half apartment; some Canadians, especially in Prince Edward Island, call it a loft. In other provinces, loft refers to a second floor in a condo unit or bungalow usually with second floor bedrooms.
- bluff: small group of trees isolated by prairie
- camp: in Northern Ontario, it refers to what is called a cottage in the rest of Ontario; often more specifically to a vacation home not directly adjacent to a body of water, and a cabin in the West. It is also used, to a lesser extent, in New Brunswick, Nova Scotia, as well as in parts of New England. It generally refers to vacation houses in rural areas.
- fire hall: fire station, firehouse.
- height of land: a drainage divide. Originally American.
- parkade: a parking garage, especially in the West.
- washroom: the general term for what is normally named public toilet or lavatory in Britain. In the United States (where it originated), the word was mostly replaced by restroom in the 20th century. Generally used only as a technical or commercial term outside of Canada. The word bathroom is also used.
- Indian reserve, rather than the US term federal Indian reservation. Often shortened to reserve, especially when the meaning is clear from context; another slang variant of this term is the shortened res or (more commonly) rez. Not to be confused with res, which in the context of universities refers strictly to residences or halls of residence (compare to the US American dorms or dormitories). The territory of the particular band nation is usually referred to on a map as (Band name here) First Nations I.R.
- rancherie: the residential area of a First Nation reserve, used in BC only.
- quiggly hole and/or quiggly: the depression in the ground left by a kekuli or pithouse. Groups of them are called "quiggly hole towns". Used in the BC Interior only.
- gas bar: a filling station (gas station) with a central island, having pumps under a fixed metal or concrete awning.
- booze can: an after-hours establishment where alcohol is served, often illegally.
- dépanneur, or the diminutive form dep, is often used by English speakers in Quebec. This is because convenience stores are called dépanneurs in Canadian French.
- snye, a side-stream channel that rejoins a larger river, creating an island.
- slough: pond – usually a pond on a farm

=== Daily life ===
Terms common in Canada, Britain, Ireland, Australia and other Commonwealth nations but less frequent or nonexistent in the United States are:

- tin (as in tin of tuna), for can, especially among older speakers. Among younger speakers, can is more common, with tin referring to a can which is wider than it is tall as in "a tin of sardines" as opposed to a "can of soup".
- cutlery, for silverware or flatware, where the material of which the utensil is made is not of consequence to the context in which it is used.
- serviette, especially in Eastern Canada, for a paper table napkin.
- tap, conspicuously more common than faucet in everyday usage.

The following are more or less distinctively Canadian:

- ABM, bank machine: synonymous with ATM (which is also used, but much more widely than ABM by financial organizations in the country).
- BFI bin: Dumpster, after a prominent Canadian waste management company, BFI Canada (which was eventually bought out and merged to become Waste Connections of Canada) in provinces where that company does business; compare to other generic trademarks such as Kleenex, Xerox, and even Dumpster itself.
- chesterfield: originally British and internationally used (as in classic furnishing terminology) to refer to a sofa whose arms are the same height as the back, it is a term for any couch or sofa in Canada (and, to some extent, Northern California). Once a hallmark of CanE, chesterfield, as with settee and davenport, is now largely in decline among younger generations in the western and central regions. Couch is now the most common term; sofa is also used.
- dart: cigarette, used primarily by adolescents and young adults.
- dressing gown or housecoat or bathrobe: a dressing gown and housecoat can be of silk or cotton, usually an attractive outer layer, while a bathrobe is made of absorbent fabric like a towel; in the United States, called a bathrobe.
- eavestrough: rain gutter. Also used, especially in the past, in the Northern and Western United States; the first recorded usage is in Herman Melville's Moby-Dick: "The tails tapering down that way, serve to carry off the water, d'ye see. Same with cocked hats; the cocks form gable-end eave-troughs [sic], Flask."
- flush: toilet, used primarily by older speakers throughout the Maritimes.
- garburator: (rhymes with carburetor) a garbage disposal.
- hydro: a common synonym for electrical service, used primarily in New Brunswick, Quebec, Ontario, Manitoba and British Columbia. Most of the power in these provinces is generated through hydroelectricity, and suppliers' company names incorporate the term "Hydro". Usage: "I didn't pay my hydro bill so they shut off my lights." Hence hydrofield or hydro corridor, a line of electricity transmission towers, usually in groups cutting across a city, and hydro lines/poles, electrical transmission lines/poles. These usages of hydro are also standard in the Australian state of Tasmania. Also in slang usage can refer to hydroponically grown marijuana.
- loonie: the Canadian one-dollar coin; derived from the use of the common loon on the reverse. The toonie (less commonly spelled tooney, twooney, twoonie) is the two-dollar coin. Loonie is also used to refer to the Canadian currency, particularly when discussing the exchange rate with the US dollar; loonie and toonie describe coinage specifically. (for example, "I have a dollar in pennies" versus "I have three loonies in my pocket").
- pencil crayon: coloured pencil.
- pogie or pogey: term referring to unemployment insurance, which is now officially called Employment Insurance in Canada. Derived from the use of pogey as a term for a poorhouse. Not used for welfare, in which case the term is "the dole", as in "he's on the dole, eh?".
- parkade: multistorey parking garage.

==== Apparel ====
The following are common in Canada, but not in the United States or the United Kingdom.

- runners: running shoes, especially in Western Canada. Also used in Australian English and Irish English. Atlantic Canada prefers sneakers while central Canada (including Quebec and Ontario) prefers running shoes.
- touque (also spelled toque or tuque): a knitted winter hat. A similar hat would be called a beanie in the western United States and a watch cap in the eastern United States, though these forms are generally closer-fitting, and may lack a brim as well as a pompom. There seems to be no exact equivalent outside Canada, since the tuque is of French Canadian origin.
- bunnyhug: a hooded sweatshirt, with or without a zipper. Used mainly in Saskatchewan.
- ginch/gonch/gitch/gotch: underwear (usually men's or boys' underwear, more specifically briefs; whereas women's underwear are gotchies), probably of Eastern European or Ukrainian origin. Gitch and gotch are primarily used in Saskatchewan and Manitoba while the variants with an n are common in Alberta and British Columbia.

==== Food and beverage ====
- Most Canadians as well as Americans in the Northwest, North Central, Prairie and Inland North prefer pop over soda to refer to a carbonated beverage, but soda is understood to mean the same thing, in contrast to British English where soda refers specifically to soda water (US/Canadian seltzer water). Soft drink is also extremely common throughout Canada.
- What Americans call Canadian bacon is named back bacon in Canada, or, if it is coated in cornmeal or ground peas, cornmeal bacon or peameal bacon.
- What most Americans call a candy bar is usually known as a chocolate bar (as in the United Kingdom). In certain areas surrounding the Bay of Fundy, it is sometimes known as a nut bar; this use is more popular in older generations. Legally only bars made of solid chocolate may be labelled chocolate bars.
- Even though the terms French fries and fries are used by Canadians, some speakers use the word chips (and its diminutive, chippies). (Chips is always used when referring to fish and chips, as elsewhere.)
- homogenized milk or homo milk: milk containing 3.25% milk fat, typically called "whole milk" in the United States.
- brown bread refers to whole-wheat bread, as in "Would you like white or brown bread for your toast?”
- An expiry date is the term used for the date when a perishable product will go bad (similar to the UK Use By date). The term expiration date is more common in the United States (where expiry date is seen mostly on the packaging of Asian food products). The term Best Before also sees common use, where although not spoiled, the product may not taste "as good".
- double-double: a cup of coffee with two measures of cream and two of sugar, most commonly associated with the Tim Hortons chain of coffee shops.
- Canadianisms relating to alcohol:
  - mickey: a 375 mL (12.7 US fl oz; 13.2 imp fl oz) bottle of hard liquor (informally called a pint in the Maritimes and the United States). In Newfoundland, this is almost exclusively referred to as a "flask". In the United States, "mickey", or "Mickey Finn", refers to a drink laced with drugs.
  - two-six, twenty-sixer, twixer: a 750 mL (25 US fl oz; 26 imp fl oz) bottle of hard liquor (called a quart in the Maritimes). The word handle is less common. Similarly, a 1.14 L (39 US fl oz; 40 imp fl oz) bottle of hard liquor is known as a forty and a 1.75 L (59 US fl oz; 62 imp fl oz) bottle is known as a sixty or half gallon in Nova Scotia.
  - Texas mickey (especially in Saskatchewan, New Brunswick and Nova Scotia; more often a "Saskatchewan mickey" in western Canada): a 3 L (101 US fl oz; 106 imp fl oz) bottle of hard liquor. (Despite the name, Texas mickeys are generally unavailable outside of Canada.)
  - two-four: a case of 24 beers, also known as a case in Eastern Canada, or a flat in Western Canada (referencing that cans of beer are often sold in packages of six, with four packages to a flat box for shipping and stacking purposes).
  - six-pack, half-sack, half-case, or poverty-pack: a case of six beers
  - cooler: an alcopop
- poutine: a snack of french fries topped with cheese curds and hot gravy.
- There are also genericized trademarks used in Canada:
  - cheezies: cheese puffs. The name is a genericized trademark based on a brand of crunchy cheese snack sold in Canada.
  - Kraft Dinner or "KD": for any packaged dry macaroni and cheese mix, even when it is not produced by Kraft.
- freezie: A frozen flavoured sugar water snack common worldwide, but known by this name exclusively in Canada.
- dainty: a fancy cookie, pastry, or square served at a social event (usually plural). Used in western Canada.

=== Informal speech ===
One of the most distinctive Canadian phrases is the spoken interrogation or tag eh. The only usage of eh exclusive to Canada, according to the Canadian Oxford Dictionary, is for "ascertaining the comprehension, continued interest, agreement, etc., of the person or persons addressed" as in, "It's four kilometres away, eh, so I have to go by bike." In that case, eh? is used to confirm the attention of the listener and to invite a supportive noise such as mm or oh or okay. This usage is also common in Queensland, Australia and New Zealand. Other uses of eh – for instance, in place of huh? or what? meaning "please repeat or say again" – are also found in parts of the British Isles and Australia. It is common in Northern/Central Ontario, the Maritimes and the Prairie provinces. The word eh is used quite frequently in the North Central dialect, so a Canadian accent is often perceived in people from North Dakota, Michigan, Minnesota, and Wisconsin.

A rubber in the US and Canada is slang for a condom. In Canada, it sometimes means an eraser (as in the United Kingdom and Ireland).

The word bum can refer either to the buttocks (as in Britain), or to a homeless person (as in the US). The "buttocks" sense does not have the indecent character it retains in British use, as it and "butt" are commonly used as a polite or childish euphemism for ruder words such as arse (commonly used in Atlantic Canada and among older people in Ontario and to the west) or ass, or mitiss (used in the Prairie Provinces, especially in northern and central Saskatchewan; probably originally a Cree loanword). Older Canadians may see "bum" as more polite than "butt", which before the 1980s was often considered rude.

Similarly the word pissed can refer either to being drunk (as in Britain), or being angry (as in the US), though anger is more often said as pissed off, while piss drunk or pissed up is said to describe inebriation (though piss drunk is sometimes also used in the US, especially in the northern states).

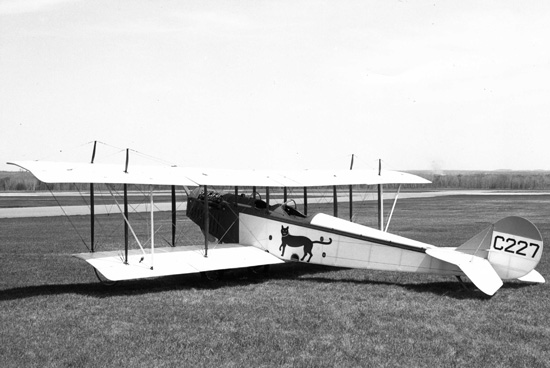
A Canadian-built Curtiss JN-4C "Canuck" training biplane of 1918, with a differing vertical tail to the original US version

The term Canuck simply means Canadian in its demonymic form, and, as a term used even by Canadians themselves, it is not considered derogatory. (In the 19th century and early 20th century it tended to refer to French-Canadians.) The only Canadian-built version of the popular World War I-era American Curtiss JN-4 Jenny training biplane aircraft, the JN-4C, 1,260 of which were built, got the "Canuck" nickname; so did another aircraft, the Fleet Model 80, built from the mid-1940s until the late 1950s. The nickname Janey Canuck was used by Anglophone women's rights writer Emily Murphy in the 1920s and the Johnny Canuck comic book character of the 1940s. Throughout the 1970s, Canada's winning World Cup men's downhill ski team was called the "Crazy Canucks" for their fearlessness on the slopes. It is also the name of the Vancouver Canucks, the National Hockey League team of Vancouver, British Columbia.

The term hoser, popularized by Bob & Doug McKenzie, typically refers to an uncouth, beer-swilling male and is a euphemism for "loser" coming from the earlier days of hockey played on an outdoor rink and the losing team would have to hose down the ice after the game so it froze smooth.

A Newf or Newfie is someone from Newfoundland and Labrador; sometimes considered derogatory. In Newfoundland, the term Mainlander refers to any Canadian (sometimes American, occasionally Labradorian) not from the island of Newfoundland. Mainlander is also occasionally used derogatorily.

In the Maritimes, a Caper or "Cape Bretoner" is someone from Cape Breton Island, a Bluenoser is someone with a thick, usually southern Nova Scotia accent or as a general term for a Nova Scotian (including Cape Bretoners), while an Islander is someone from Prince Edward Island (the same term is used in British Columbia for people from Vancouver Island, or the numerous islands along it). A Haligonian refers to someone from the city of Halifax.

Cape Bretoners and Newfies (from Newfoundland and Labrador) often have similar slang. "Barmp" is often used as the sound a car horn makes, example: "He cut me off so I barmped the horn at him". When saying "B'y", while sounds like the traditional farewell, it is a syncopated shortening of the word "boy", referring to a person, example: "How's it goin, b'y?". Another slang that is commonly used is "doohickey" which means an object, example: "Pass me that doohickey over there". When an individual uses the word "biffed", they mean that they threw something. Example: "I got frustrated so I biffed it across the room".

=== Survey and research methodology ===
Canadian English dialectology examines Canadian English through the use of written surveys due to the vastness of the country and the difficulties of conducting face-to-face interviews on a nationwide level. The historical overview of written surveys in Canadian-English dialectology includes Avis's study of speech differences among the Ontario-United States borders through the use of questionnaires. Another example is the Survey of Canadian English directed by Scargill. A more recent example would be Nylvek's survey of Saskatchewan English and Chambers' trans-Canada dialect questionnaires.

== Attitudes ==
An attitude study in the late 1970s revealed a positive attitude toward Canadian linguistic features. Features include front vowel merger before /r/, low-back vowel merger, Canadian Raising, and Canadian lexical items. Still, the sample group in British Columbia showed a preference for UK and US English.

This attitude sees a change years later. A survey about attitudes towards CE was conducted with a diverse sample group in Vancouver, BC, in 2009. Among 429 Vancouverites, 81.1% believe there is a Canadian way of speaking English, 72.9% can tell CanE speakers from American English speakers, 69.1% consider CanE a part of their Canadian identity, and 74.1% think CanE should be taught in schools. Due to the unavailability of free and easy-to-access CanE dictionaries, many Canadian opt for other non-Canadian English dictionaries today. Historically, American, British, and Irish texts are used in Canadian schools for the most part; even though Canadian reference work was written and became available in the 1960s, they were never preferred as teaching material.

A preference change can be seen at the end of higher education in Canada. At the University of Toronto's Graduate English department, "Canadian English" and a "consistent spelling" are officially "the standard for all Ph.D. dissertations," with the Canadian Oxford English Dictionary as the official guideline. However, there is no mention of which grammar guide was to be followed because there was never a solid standard developed for spelling and grammar.

In 2011, just under 21.5 million Canadians, representing 65% of the population, spoke English most of the time at home, while 58% declared it their mother language. English is the major language everywhere in Canada except Quebec, and most Canadians (85%) can speak English. While English is not the preferred language in Quebec, 36.1% of the Québécois can speak English. Nationally, Francophones are five times more likely to speak English than Anglophones are to speak French – 44% and 9% respectively. Only 3.2% of Canada's English-speaking population resides in Quebec—mostly in Montreal. (Note: 18,858,908 Canadians identify their mother tongue as English. 599,230 Québécois identify their mother tongue as English and of that 309,885 live in Montreal.)

A study conducted in 2002 inquired Canadians from Ontario and Alberta about the "pleasantness" and "correctness" of different varieties of Canadian English based on province. Albertans and Ontarians all seem to rate their English and BC English in the top three. However, both hold a low opinion of Quebec English. Unlike the assumption that Toronto or Ontario English would be the most prestigious considering these regions are the most economically robust, BC had the best public opinion regarding pleasantness and correctness among the participants.

Jaan Lilles argues in an essay for English Today that there is no variety of "Canadian English." According to Lilles, Canadian English is simply not a "useful fiction". He goes on to argue that too often supposedly unique features of Canadian speakers, such as certain lexical terms such as muskeg are artificially exaggerated to distinguish Canadian speech primarily from that found in the United States. Lilles was heavily critiqued in the next issue of English Today by lexicographer Fraser Sutherland and others. According to Stefan Dollinger, Lilles' paper "is not a paper based on any data or other new information but more of a pamphlet – so much so that it should not have been published without a public critique". He continues, "The paper is insightful for different reasons: it is a powerful testimony of personal anecdote and opinion.... As an opinion piece, it offers a good debating case." As a linguistic account, however, it "essentializes a prior state, before Canada was an independent political entity."

== See also ==
- Bibliography of Canada#Canadian style guides
- List of Canadian English dictionaries
- Dictionary of Canadianisms on Historical Principles, Second Edition
- Bilingual education by country or region
- Bilingual education
- American and British English spelling differences
- Bungi creole
- Canadian Gaelic
- Franglais
- Regional accents of English
- Canadian Language Museum
- English in the Commonwealth of Nations
