= Dictionary of American English =

1938 dictionary of American English

A Dictionary of American English on Historical Principles (DAE) is a dictionary of terms appearing in American English published by the University of Chicago Press and funded by the University of Chicago. Preview fascicles were published starting in 1936, which were later compiled into full volumes. The four volumes were published from 1938 to 1944. It is not a general dictionary of English, but rather focuses on words that either A) originated in English-speaking America, either in colonial times or after the independence of the United States; B) were used more or differently in the United States than elsewhere; or C) possessed a strong connection with the history of the United States. It was intended to be something of an American equivalent of the Oxford English Dictionary for British English.

== History ==
=== Creation ===
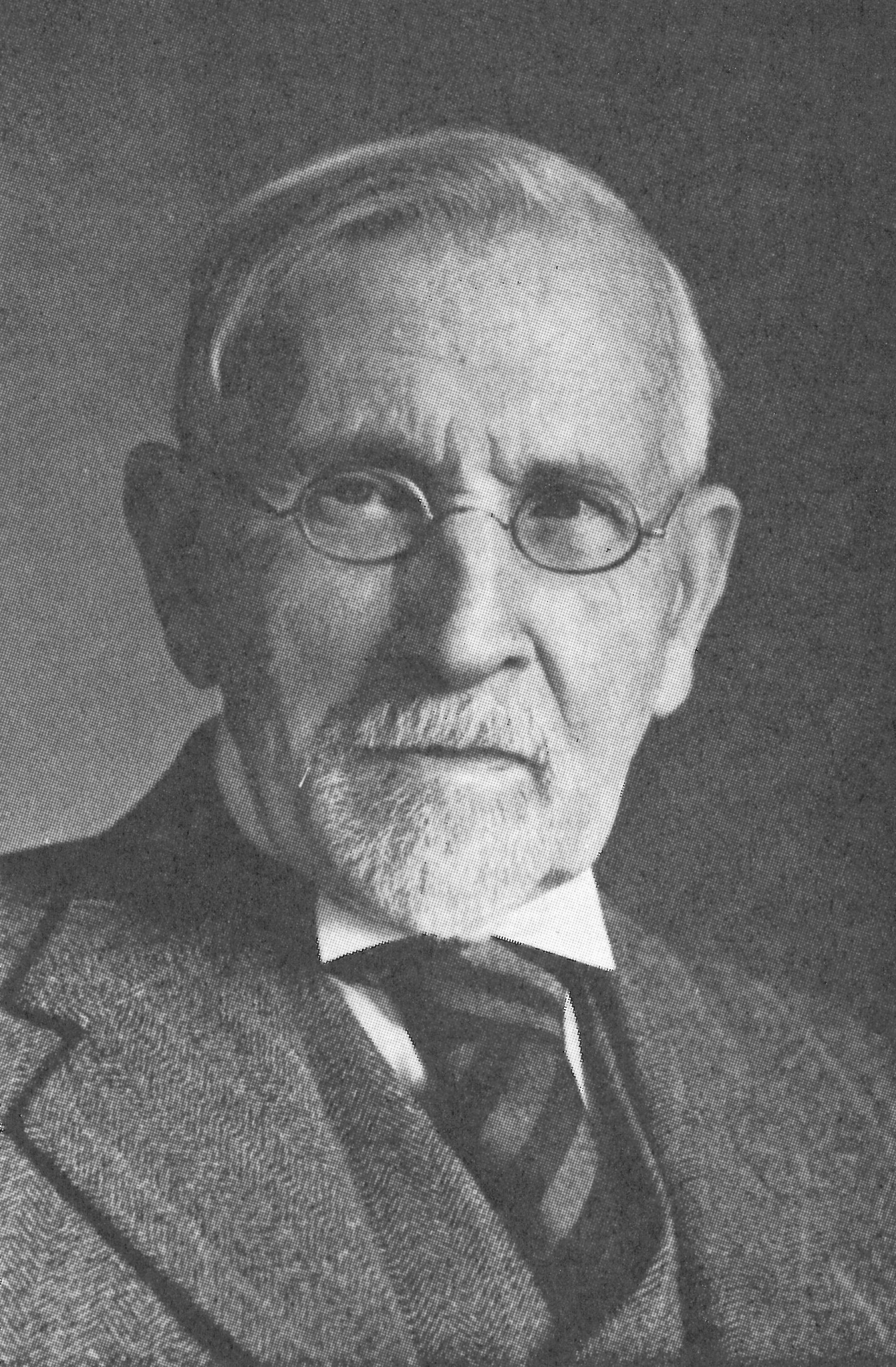
Sir William A. Craigie (1867–1957), editor of the Dictionary of American English

William A. Craigie was a talented Scottish linguist. He joined the group that wrote the Oxford English Dictionary (OED) in 1897, and after the death of Henry Bradley in 1923, was one of the two top editors on the project (with Charles Talbut Onions). He also clashed with others on the project. In 1924, Craigie travelled from England to the University of Chicago to teach a summer course. While working on entries starting with "U" for the near-finished OED, he found two words in succession where all the evidence after 1700 was solely American. He proposed the creation of a dictionary specifically of American English. The University of Chicago agreed to his proposal, and signed him as a professor in October 1924. Craigie then moved from Oxford to Chicago.

The work of compiling the dictionary began in 1925. The first volume appeared in 1936 under the editorship of Craigie and James R. Hulbert, a professor of English at the University of Chicago. The four volume edition was completed with the help of George Watson and Allen Walker Read. The group referenced early literature depicting American regional accents, including three novels by John Neal: Brother Jonathan (1825), Rachel Dyer (1828), and The Down-Easters, &c. &c. &c. (1833).

=== Legacy ===
While Craigie was the driving force behind the project, he did not endear himself to the rest of the staff, especially later in his life. They complained of his egomania and his derision of them, as well as a perceived lack of respect – he shrank the font size of the names of the other editors in the printed version, gave them downgraded titles to what they believed they had, and outright removed some editors from the credits of the bound editions. This resulted in the Chicago University Press not wishing to sponsor a revision or second edition under the same leadership. The work has stayed as a time capsule of 1925–1944 scholarship as a result.

One of the editors on the project was the linguist Mitford M. Matthews. Matthews had been a key member of the project throughout all four volumes, yet he was mentioned just once in the preface to the second volume, and not at all in the third and fourth volumes. Matthews was unhappy with the share of the credit he had received for the DAE, and "wanted a dictionary with his name on it." The result was the University of Chicago sponsoring the production of his A Dictionary of Americanisms on Historical Principles, published in 1951. Matthews used research for the DAE for his Dictionary of Americanisms as well. That work had a stricter standard than the DAE, and exclusively covered words and phrases that originated in the United States, not merely ones with different usage in American English. He also considered some of the DAE inclusions mistakes, and thought some of its terms were not truly Americanisms.

The Dictionary of American Regional English (DARE) is unrelated to the DAE, but somewhat similar in having a focus on American English. It compiles dialect variations across American English by region, and is a five volume work that began in 1985.

== Volumes ==
- I. A – Corn patch.
- II. Corn pit – Honk.
- III. Honk – Record.
- IV. Recorder – Zu-zu; Bibliography

The four volumes were reprinted in 1959–1960, unchanged.

== Reception ==
The DAE received positive reviews at the time of its release. A 1936 review of the first fascicle (A-Baggage) by The New York Times wrote that "It is safe to say it will be a landmark in American culture, a storehouse for the scholar, a mine of inexhaustible interest for the curious". A 1944 review of the final volume was similarly positive and brimming with nationalistic pride, stating: "This dictionary is the American language's Declaration of Independence."

Norman Davis wrote in a review of the 1959–1960 reprint that the "great merits" of the DAE were known, but was disappointed that there were no updates or addenda in the reprint. He thought that using it most effectively would require cross-referencing with Matthews' 1951 A Dictionary of Americanisms to see if there was updated or simply different scholarship in that work.
