= A Dictionary of Americanisms =

Dictionary of English words and phrases that originated in the US

A Dictionary of Americanisms on Historical Principles
- Editor: Mitford M. Mathews
- Subject: English language
- Publisher: University of Chicago Press
- Publication date: 1951
- Media type: Print
- OCLC: 137743375
- Dewey Decimal: 427.9
- LC Class: PE2835

A Dictionary of Americanisms on Historical Principles is a dictionary of English words and phrases that originated in the United States. The two-volume dictionary was edited by Mitford M. Mathews and was published in 1951 by University of Chicago Press.

The work should not be confused with John Russell Bartlett's Dictionary of Americanisms.
