= Definitions of fascism =

Theories about the phenomenon of fascism

What constitutes a definition of fascism and fascist governments has been highly disputed regarding the exact nature of fascism and its core tenets amongst historians, political scientists, and other scholars ever since Benito Mussolini first used the term in 1914. In 2016 historian Ian Kershaw wrote that "trying to define 'fascism' is like trying to nail jelly to the wall".

A significant number of scholars agree that a "fascist regime" is foremost an authoritarian form of government; however, the general academic consensus also holds that not all authoritarian regimes are fascist, and more distinguishing traits are required for a regime to be characterized as such.

Similarly, fascism as an ideology is also hard to define. Originally, it referred to a totalitarian political movement linked with corporatism which existed in Italy from 1922 to 1943 under the leadership of Benito Mussolini. Many scholars use the word "fascism" without capitalization in a more general sense to refer to an ideology (or group of ideologies) that has been influential in many countries at various times. For this purpose, they have sought to identify what Roger Griffin calls a "fascist minimum"—that is, the minimum conditions a movement must meet to be considered fascist. Other scholars, such as Robert Paxton, have denied that fascism is an ideology at all, characterizing it instead as a loose collection of "mobilizing passions".

The apocalyptic and millenarian aspects of fascism have often been subjected to study.

== By encyclopedias and dictionaries ==
=== American Heritage Dictionary of the English Language ===
The American Heritage Dictionary of the English Language 5th edition (2022) defines fascism as "A system of government marked by centralization of authority under a dictator, a capitalist economy subject to stringent governmental controls, violent suppression of the opposition, and typically a policy of belligerent nationalism and racism". Its second definition is, "Oppressive, dictatorial control".

=== Cambridge Advanced Learner's Dictionary ===
Cambridge Advanced Learner's Dictionary (4th edition, 2013) defines fascism as "a political system based on a very powerful leader, state control, and being extremely proud of country and race, and in which political opposition is not allowed."

=== Canadian Encyclopedia ===
The Canadian Encyclopedia defines fascism as "military dictatorships and extreme right-wing governments and organizations (or individuals) known to be either violently anticommunist or violently anti-Semitic, or both. These are often important elements within fascism (as are the institutionalization of sexual repression and strong anti-female, anti-homosexual and pro-family biases), but the term should be more precisely confined to those mass movements and political parties that originated in the capitalist economies of Europe in the late 19th and early 20th centuries, culminating in Mussolini's Italy, Hitler's Germany and Salazar's Portugal. It is characterized by a hatred for liberalism, socialism, democracy, internationalism and the parliamentary system; by extreme patriotism and aggressive nationalism, and hostility to other nations and races; by a glorification of power, violence and war; by dreams of conquest and expansion; by a hankering after a supposedly glorious past; by paramilitary associations; by the myth of the "leader" to whom superhuman qualities are attributed; and by the creation of a convenient scapegoat - usually Jews - for all social, national and economic ills."

=== Chambers 21st Century Dictionary ===
Chambers 21st Century Dictionary defines fascism as "a political movement or system characterized mainly by a belief in the supremacy of the chosen national group over all others, and in which there is, typically, state control of all aspects of society, a supreme dictator, suppression of democratic bodies such as trade unions and emphasis on nationalism and militarism". After recognizing the word being used to reference specifically the "system in force in Italy from 1922 to 1943", its third definition is "any system or doctrine characterized by a belief in the supremacy of a particular way of viewing things, usually an idealization of what is considered perfect".

=== Collins dictionaries ===
COBUILD Student's Dictionary Plus Grammar (1995) defines fascism as a "right-wing political philosophy that believes in the importance of having strong rules, state control, and the prevention of political opposition."

Collins Canadian Dictionary (2nd edition, 2016) defines fascism as a "right-wing political system characterized by state control and extreme nationalism."

Collins COBUILD English Dictionary for Advanced Learners (3rd edition, 2001) defines lowercase f fascism and capital F Fascism as "a set of right-wing political beliefs that includes strong control of society and the economy by the state, a powerful role for the armed forces, and the stopping of political opposition."

Collins English Dictionary's website includes the following additional definitions such as:

- "any ideology or movement inspired by Italian Fascism, such as German National Socialism; any right-wing nationalist ideology or movement with an authoritarian and hierarchical structure that is fundamentally opposed to democracy and liberalism."
- "any ideology, movement, programme, tendency, etc that may be characterized as excessively prescriptive or authoritarian."
- "the political movement, doctrine, system, or regime of Benito Mussolini in Italy, which encouraged militarism and nationalism, organizing the country along hierarchical authoritarian lines."
- "a governmental system led by a dictator having complete power, forcibly suppressing opposition and criticism, regimenting all industry, commerce, etc., and emphasizing an aggressive nationalism and often racism.

Collins English School Dictionary (1st edition, 2022) defines fascism as "an extreme political ideology or system of government with a powerful dictator and state control of most activities. Nationalism is encouraged and political opposition is not allowed."

=== Encarta Webster's College Dictionary ===
The collegiate edition of the Encarta Webster's Dictionary defines fascism as "any movement, tendency, or ideology that favors dictatorial government, centralized control of private enterprise, repression of all opposition, and extreme nationalism".

=== Encyclopaedia Britannica ===
The Encyclopedia Britannica defines fascism as a "political ideology and mass movement that dominated many parts of central, southern, and eastern Europe between 1919 and 1945 and that also had adherents in western Europe, the United States, South Africa, Japan, Latin America, and the Middle East", adding that, "Although fascist parties and movements differed significantly from one another, they had many characteristics in common, including extreme militaristic nationalism, contempt for electoral democracy and political and cultural liberalism, a belief in natural social hierarchy and the rule of elites, and the desire to create a Volksgemeinschaft (German: "people's community"), in which individual interests would be subordinated to the good of the nation."

=== Encyclopedia of European Social History ===
In the Encyclopedia of European Social History, Alexander De Grand describes Italian and German Fascism as a "mass movement of the middle class" who, along with the ruling elite, had little to gain from the political and social upheaval of working-class socialist revolution. Fascism saw contemporary liberalism and liberal democracy as unable to continue control of what they saw as a disintegrating status quo. De Grand writes, "Faced with a shattered political order, a highly politicized and fragmented body politic, a revolutionary threat, and a profound loss of faith in the market mechanisms, Fascism put forward a vision of social and political solidarity based on the primacy of membership in the organic nation (Fascism) or race (Nazism)". The characteristics of Fascism included "the cult of the single leader who represented the essence of the nation or race; the single party through which all political life was directed; state control of mass communications and propaganda; the absorption of all independent social, leisure time, and professional activity within the state; the destruction of independent labor organizations; state direction of the economy within the context of private ownership; and the mobilization of society for war against domestic and foreign enemies". Additionally, according to De Grand, Fascism (and Nazism) aimed at "restoring traditional social and gender hierarchies"; to both "respect private property and ownership of the means of production" and, contradictorily, direct the economy at the level of the state; focused on militarism; and promoted a "spartan ethic of self-denial, austerity, and subordination of the individual to the group" (despite this not being reflected in the private behaviour of the leaders). Economically, the closeness between the state and industry led to "state-directed autarky with major branches of the economy organized into government-sponsored cartels geared to war production and to the exploitation of conquered territories".

=== Holocaust Encyclopedia ===
The Holocaust Encyclopedia defines fascism as "a far-right political philosophy, or theory of government, that emerged in the early twentieth century. Fascism prioritizes the nation over the individual, who exists to serve the nation", and as "an ultranationalist, authoritarian political philosophy. It combines elements of nationalism, militarism, economic self-sufficiency, and totalitarianism. It opposes communism, socialism, pluralism, individual rights and equality, and democratic government".

When imbued explicitly and pre-dominantly with racist appeals to an implied racial empire, as in the case of Nazism, fascism takes on the tones of the Third Reich as opposed to the fascism of Mussolini's Italy or Franco's Spain, where racism may have been a notable element in the tone and substance of their messaging, but where the racial notions incentivizing the drive to Empire were somewhat less pronounced than in Germany. The Holocaust Encyclopedia distinguishes the Nazi style of Fascism as a fully realized fascism or as 'fascism in action' or otherwise as 'German fascism'--a form of fascism that has a different quality than the other discriminatory and ultranationalist fascisms at the time.

It exceeds the imprimatur of the Holocaust Encyclopedia to delineate this style of politics as anything other than 'Nazism,' and a reason for that may be that there are no other fully (and catastrophically) realized exemplars of this form of the Third Reich's mode of industrialized negative eugenic genocide as the methodological hallmark of an achieved global empire. However, a generic term to distinguish this style of politics—hovering somewhere between fascism and totalitarianism, with an extra-emphasis on the component of racism as a unifying factor within the system—is 'palingenetic ultranationalism' coined by Roger Griffin to describe a new consensus amongst scholars of fascism on this dimension, whose work has its own section amongst the scholars below.

=== Longman Dictionary of Contemporary English ===
Longman Dictionary of Contemporary English (5th edition) defines fascism as "a right-wing political system in which people’s lives are completely controlled by the state and no political opposition is allowed."

=== Macmillan English Dictionary for Advanced Learners ===
Macmillan English Dictionary for Advanced Learners of American English (2002) defines fascism as "a very right-wing political system in which the government is very powerful and controls society and the economy completely, not allowing any opposition, as was practiced in Italy and Germany in the 1930s and 40s."

=== Macquarie Dictionary ===
The first edition (1981) of the Macquarie Dictionary includes the following in its definitions of fascism: "a governmental system with strong centralised power, permitting no opposition or criticism, controlling all affairs of the nation (industrial, commercial, etc.), emphasising an aggressive nationalism, and (often) anticommunist" and, "any extreme right-wing ideology, esp. one involving racialism".

=== Merriam-Webster dictionaries ===
Merriam-Webster Dictionary defines fascism as "a populist political philosophy, movement, or regime (such as that of the Fascist) that exalts nation and often race above the individual, that is associated with a centralized autocratic government headed by a dictatorial leader, and that is characterized by severe economic and social regimentation and by forcible suppression of opposition."

The 2025 revised edition of the dictionary simplifies this definition of fascism as "a political philosophy, movement or regime that exalts nation and often race and stands for a centralized autocratic often militaristic government."

Merriam Webster's Essential Learner's English Dictionary (2024) defines "fascism or Fascism" as "a way of organizing a society in which a government is ruled by a dictator and in which people are not allowed to disagree with the government."

After recording the specific meaning relating to the "principles of the Fascist", Webster's Third New International Dictionary gives the following under its definition of fascism: "a: any program for setting up a centralized autocratic national regime with severely nationalistic policies, exercising regimentation of industry, commerce, and finance, rigid censorship, and forcible suppression of opposition. b: any tendency towards or actual exercise of severe autocratic or dictatorial control (as over others within an organization)".

=== Oxford dictionaries ===
The Canadian Oxford Dictionary (2nd edition, 2004) has three definitions:

- Capital F Fascism as historically "the totalitarian principles and organization of the extreme right-wing nationalist movement in Italy."
- Lowercase f fascism as "any similar nationalist and authoritarian movement, esp. German National Socialism."
- Lowercase f fascism as "derogatory extreme right-wing, authoritarian, or intolerant views or practices."

The Oxford Advanced Learner's Dictionary describes fascism as "an extreme right-wing political system or attitude that is in favour of strong central government, aggressively promoting your own country or race above others, and that does not allow any opposition" (the Oxford Advanced American Dictionary is similar, missing the middle phrase) and, under its second definition, "extreme views or practices that try to make other people think and behave in the same way".

The Oxford Canadian Dictionary of Current English (1st edition, 2005) has three simplified definitions of the Canadian Oxford Dictionary's (2nd edition, 2004) definitions:

- Uppercase F Fascism as "hist the totalitarian principles, etc. of the extreme right-wing nationalist movement in Italy (1922-43)."
- Also lowercase f fascism as "any similar movement, e.g. Nazism."
- Also lowercase f fascism as "derogatory extreme right-wing or authoritarian views."

The Concise Oxford English Dictionary (11th edition, 2008) defines fascism as "an authoritarian and nationalistic right-wing system of government".

The Oxford Paperback Dictionary & Thesaurus (3rd edition, 2009) defines fascism under two definitions:

- "a right-wing system of government with extreme nationalistic beliefs" (a definition shared by Oxford's English Mini Dictionary (8th edition, 2013).)
- "an attitude which is very intolerant or right wing."

=== Random House Webster's Unabridged Dictionary ===
The Random House Webster's Unabridged Dictionary defines fascism as "a governmental system led by a dictator having complete power, forcibly suppressing opposition and criticism, regimenting all industry, commerce, etc., and emphasizing an aggressive nationalism and often racism".

=== Webster's New World Dictionary ===
Webster's New World Dictionary (4th edition, 2013) defines fascism as "a system of government characterized by dictatorship, belligerent nationalism and racism, militarism, etc."

== By fascists ==
=== Benito Mussolini ===
Benito Mussolini, who was the first to use the term for his political party in 1915, described fascism in The Doctrine of Fascism, published in 1932, as follows:

Granted that the 19th century was the century of socialism, liberalism, democracy, this does not mean that the 20th century must also be the century of socialism, liberalism, democracy. Political doctrines pass; nations remain. We are free to believe that this is the century of authority, a century tending to the 'right', a Fascist century. If the 19th century were the century of the individual (liberalism implies individualism) we are free to believe that this is the 'collective' century, and therefore the century of the State.

The Fascist conception of the State is all-embracing; outside of it no human or spiritual values can exist, much less have value. Thus understood, Fascism is totalitarian, and the Fascist State – a synthesis and a unit inclusive of all values – interprets, develops, and potentiates the whole life of a people.

Fascism is a religious conception in which man is seen in his immanent relationship with a superior law and with an objective Will that transcends the particular individual and raises him to conscious membership of a spiritual society. Whoever has seen in the religious politics of the Fascist regime nothing but mere opportunism has not understood that Fascism besides being a system of government is also, and above all, a system of thought.

In a speech before the Chamber of Deputies on 26 May 1927, Mussolini said:

Everything in the State, nothing outside the State, nothing against the State. (Italian: Tutto nello Stato, niente al di fuori dello Stato, nulla contro lo Stato)

=== Francisco Franco ===
In an interview with Henri Massis in 1938, Spanish Nationalist leader Francisco Franco described his movement in Spain as part of a wider trend and said about this trend:

Fascism, since that is the word that is used, fascism presents, wherever it manifests itself, characteristics which are varied to the extent that countries and national temperaments vary. It is essentially a defensive reaction of the organism, a manifestation of the desire to live, of the desire not to die, which at certain times seizes a whole people. So each people reacts in its own way, according to its conception of life. Our rising, here, has a Spanish meaning! What can it have in common with Hitlerism, which was, above all, a reaction against the state of things created by the defeat, and by the abdication and the despair that followed it?

== By scholars ==
=== Walter Benjamin's "Theories of German Fascism" ===
Walter Benjamin was early to note a distinction between the style of fascism that had held power in Italy for almost a decade, and the incipient Nazi regime that seemed poised to take power in Germany when he wrote the article "Theories of German Fascism" in 1930. Whereas the form of fascism developing in Italy seemed largely content with a jingoist, dictatorial imperialist posturing, Benjamin notes that in Germany the utopian (or more properly dystopian) eschaton or goal of Nazism seemed to be indicated as a heavily technologized and scaled form of war, in and of itself and for its own sake, without reference (in its realpolitik as opposed to its propaganda) to individual heroics or concretely limited and thus theoretically achievable objectives, prioritizing maximum destruction of human and natural life as its raison d'etat. Benjamin very nearly coins the term ‘forever war’ in this essay, introducing the concept with the line, "The last war [re: WWI] has already shown that the total disorganization imperialist war entails, and the manner in which it is waged, threaten to make it an endless war."

The use of cutting-edge technologies in combination with a conservative, irredentist, millenarian aesthetic is the signature of fascist style and technique. The dynamic syncretism of these opposed tendencies is the hallmark of its political form and image.

This sort of syncretism may be seen in Italy's fetishism of the aristocracy in combination with Mussolini's use of the newly invented media-forms of radio and film. But in Germany we see the dynamic erupt on a larger and more effectively belligerent range and scope of practice. Mussolini's fascism was politically effective within the sphere of Italian politics and clearly had influence over the development of fascism in Germany. But what Hitler wanted to achieve, as opposed to the more circumscribed and inarticulately blustering expression of goals and means as voiced in Mussolini's policy and presentation, was on an altogether different scale and seemed closer to the mythical core of the appeal in fascism to begin with, as exemplified by the romanticism of technological warfare in Italian futurist writings. Benjamin would later develop this idea into a formula, anticipated at length in a number of passages in his "Theories of German Fascism", but stated as a more precisely delineated aphorism in his most famous essay, "Work of Art in the Age of Mechanical Reproduction":

"All efforts to render politics aesthetic culminate in one thing: war. War and war only can set a goal for mass movements on the largest scale while respecting the traditional property system. This is the political formula for the situation. The technological formula may be stated as follows: Only war makes it possible to mobilize all of today’s technical resources while maintaining the property system. It goes without saying that the Fascist apotheosis of war does not employ such arguments. [It merely realizes them in the realm of aesthetics, and moves toward them in its policy]."

=== Ruth Ben-Ghiat ===
Ruth Ben-Ghiat, an American historian and cultural critic, described fascism as "the original phase of authoritarianism, along with early communism, when a population has undergone huge dislocations or they perceive that there's been changes in society that are very rapid, too rapid for their taste" and added that, "These are moments when demagogues appeal. Mussolini was the first to come up after the war, and he promised this enticing mixture of Hypernationalism and imperialism, like, 'We're gonna revive the Roman Empire.'"

=== Umberto Eco ===
In his 1995 essay "Ur-Fascism", cultural theorist Umberto Eco lists fourteen general properties of fascist ideology. He argues that it is not possible to organise these into a coherent system, but that "it is enough that one of them be present to allow fascism to coagulate around it". He uses the term "Ur-Fascism" as a generic description of different historical forms of fascism.

=== Emilio Gentile ===
Italian historian of fascism Emilio Gentile described fascism in 1996 as the "sacralization of politics" through totalitarian methods and argued the following ten constituent elements:

1. a mass movement with multi-class membership in which prevail, among the leaders and the militants, the middle sectors, in large part new to political activity, organized as a party militia, that bases its identity not on social hierarchy or class origin but on a sense of comradeship, believes itself invested with a mission of national regeneration, considers itself in a state of war against political adversaries and aims at conquering a monopoly of political power by using terror, parliamentary tactics, and deals with leading groups, to create a new regime that destroys parliamentary democracy;
2. an "anti-ideological" and pragmatic ideology that proclaims itself anti-materialist, anti-individualist, anti-liberal, antidemocratic, anti-Marxist, populist and anticapitalist, and expresses itself aesthetically more than theoretically by means of a new political style and by myths, rites, and symbols as a lay religion designed to acculturate, socialize, and integrate the faith of the masses with the goal of creating a "new man";
3. a culture founded on mystical thought and the tragic and activist sense of life conceived of as the manifestation of the will to power, on the myth of youth as artificer of history, and on the exaltation of the militarization of politics as the model of life and collective activity;
4. a totalitarian conception of the primacy of politics, conceived of as an integrating experience to carry out the fusion of the individual and the masses in the organic and mystical unity of the nation as an ethnic and moral community, adopting measures of discrimination and persecution against those considered to be outside this community either as enemies of the regime or members of races considered to be inferior or otherwise dangerous for the integrity of the nation;
5. a civil ethic founded on total dedication to the national community, on discipline, virility, comradeship, and the warrior spirit;
6. a single state party that has the task of providing for the armed defense of the regime, selecting its directing cadres, and organizing the masses within the state in a process of permanent mobilization of emotion and faith;
7. a police apparatus that prevents, controls, and represses dissidence and opposition, including through the use of organized terror;
8. a political system organized by hierarchy of functions named from the top and crowned by the figure of the "leader", invested with a sacred charisma, who commands, directs, and coordinates the activities of the party and the regime;
9. corporative organization of the economy that suppresses trade union liberty, broadens the sphere of state intervention, and seeks to achieve, by principles of technocracy and solidarity, the collaboration of the "productive sectors" under control of the regime, to achieve its goals of power, yet preserving private property and class divisions;
10. a foreign policy inspired by the myth of national power and greatness, with the goal of imperialist expansion.

=== Roger Griffin ===
Historian and political scientist Roger Griffin's definition of fascism focuses on the populist fascist rhetoric that argues for a "re-birth" of a conflated nation and ethnic people. According to Griffin,

[F]ascism is best defined as a revolutionary form of nationalism, one that sets out to be a political, social and ethical revolution, welding the "people" into a dynamic national community under new elites infused with heroic values. The core myth that inspires this project is that only a populist, trans-class movement of purifying, cathartic national rebirth (palingenesis) can stem the tide of decadence.

Griffin writes that a broad scholarly consensus developed in English-speaking social sciences during the 1990s, around the following definition of fascism:

[Fascism is] a genuinely revolutionary, trans-class form of anti-liberal, and in the last analysis, anti-conservative nationalism. As such it is an ideology deeply bound up with modernization and modernity, one which has assumed a considerable variety of external forms to adapt itself to the particular historical and national context in which it appears, and has drawn a wide range of cultural and intellectual currents, both left and right, anti-modern and pro-modern, to articulate itself as a body of ideas, slogans, and doctrine. In the inter-war period it manifested itself primarily in the form of an elite-led "armed party" which attempted, mostly unsuccessfully, to generate a populist mass movement through a liturgical style of politics and a programme of radical policies which promised to overcome a threat posed by international socialism, to end the degeneration affecting the nation under liberalism, and to bring about a radical renewal of its social, political and cultural life as part of what was widely imagined to be the new era being inaugurated in Western civilization. The core mobilizing myth of fascism which conditions its ideology, propaganda, style of politics and actions is the vision of the nation's imminent rebirth from decadence.

Griffin argues that the above definition can be condensed into one sentence: "Fascism is a political ideology whose mythic core in its various permutations is a palingenetic form of populist ultra-nationalism." The word "palingenetic" in this case refers to notions of national rebirth.

While Roger Griffin did not list out a exact number of criterion that fascism always entails, his definition tends to include four subcomponents.

1. Mythic core / myth of decadence
2. Palingensis
3. Populism
4. Ultranationalism

The level of commitment to a literal achievement of Griffin's above-defined palingenesis varies in different fascisms, but the allusion to something in the shape of palingenesis as an element of the fascist appeal to unity amongst their base is invariant according to Griffin's reading of the historical exemplars.

=== Ian Kershaw ===
In his history of Europe in the first half of the 20th century, To Hell and Back, British historian Ian Kershaw, while noting the difficulties in defining fascism, found these common factors in the extreme Right-wing movements of the late 1920s and early 1930s, whether they called themselves "fascist" or not:

- Hypernationalism – based on the integrated nation cleansed of the influence of ethnic minorities, "foreign" races, and other undesirable elements;
- racial exclusiveness – although not necessarily the biological racism of the Nazis – a cleansed nation would allow the unique or superior qualities of the people to come forth;
- complete destruction of political enemies – through radical and violent means, not only against Marxists, but also democrats, liberals, and reactionaries;
- an emphasis on discipline, manliness and militarism – linked to authoritarianism and often involving the use of paramilitary forces.

Other features Kershaw found to be important, and sometimes central to specific movements, but not present in all:

- the creation of a "new man" and a new society – requiring the total commitment of the population to the overturning of the existing social order and the building of a national utopia, in "a revolution of mentalities, values and will".
- irredentist or imperialist goals – not necessarily all expansionist in nature;
- anti-capitalism;
- corporatism – the reorganization of the national economy along corporatist lines, with trade unions eliminated and groupings of economic interests called "corporations" (i.e. industrial and agricultural workers, teachers and students, lawyers and doctors, civil servants, etc.) regulated by the state.

Kershaw argues that the difference between fascism and other forms of right-wing authoritarianism in the Interwar period is that the latter generally aimed "to conserve the existing social order", whereas fascism was "revolutionary", seeking to change society and obtain "total commitment" from the population.

Kershaw writes about the essential appeal of fascism and the reasons for its success, where it was successful (primarily in Italy and Germany):

Fascism's message of national renewal, powerfully linking fear and hope, was diverse enough to be capable of crossing social boundaries. Its message enveloped an appeal to the material vested interests of quite disparate social groups in a miasma of emotive rhetoric about the future of the nation. It touched the interests of those who felt threatened by the forces of modernizing social change. It mobilized those who believed they had something to lose – status, property, power, cultural tradition – through the presumed menace of internal enemies, and especially through the advance of socialism and its revolutionary promise of social revolution. However, it bound up those interests in a vision of a new society that would reward the strong, the fit, the meritorious – the deserving (in their own eyes).

... Fascism's triumph depended on the complete discrediting of state authority, weak political elite who could no longer ensure that a system would operate in their interests, the fragmentation of party politics, and the freedom to build a movement that promised a radical alternative.

=== George Lakoff and Mark Johnson ===
In their book Philosophy in the Flesh: The Embodied Mind and its Challenge to Western Thought, philosophers George Lakoff and Mark Johnson wrote about fascism, in the chapter about morality:

The Moral Order hierarchy is commonly extended in [Anglo-American] culture to include other relations of moral superiority: Western culture over non-Western culture; America over other countries; citizens over immigrants; Christians over non-Christians; straights over gays; the rich over the poor. Incidentally, the Moral Order metaphor gives us a better understanding of what fascism is: Fascism legitimizes such a moral order and seeks to enforce it through the power of the state.

=== John Lukacs ===
John Lukacs, Hungarian-American historian and Holocaust survivor, argues in The Hitler of History that there is no such thing as generic fascism, claiming that National Socialism and Italian Fascism were more different than similar and that, alongside communism, they were ultimately radical forms of populism.

=== John R. McNeill ===
John R. McNeill, "distinguished university professor in the Department of History in the College and the School of Foreign Service" at Georgetown University, and past president of the American Historical Association, defined a numerical rating system for determining how fascist a person is based on a ranking across 11 categories. Within each category McNeill assigns 0 to 4 "Benitos" (4 being the most fascistic) and then tallies the results for an overall fascism score. For each category, McNeill provides a written definition and historical examples. The categories are:

1. Hyper-nationalism
2. Militarism
3. Glorification of violence
4. Fetishization of youth
5. Fetishization of masculinity
6. Leader cult
7. Lost-golden-age syndrome
8. Self-definition by opposition
9. Mass mobilization
10. Hierarchical structure
11. Theatricality

In 2020, McNeill expanded his system with eight more categories:

12. Chaotic administration
13. Information and media policy
14. Consolidation of power
15. Pecuniary and institutional corruption
16. Economic policy
17. Foreign policy
18. Cultural policy
19. Racial policy

=== Ludwig von Mises ===
Classical liberal economist and philosopher Ludwig von Mises, in his 1927 book Liberalism, argued that fascism was a nationalist and militarist reaction against the rise of the communist Third International, in which the nationalists and militarists came to oppose the principles of liberal democracy because "Liberalism, they thought, stayed their hand when they desired to strike a blow against the revolutionary parties while it was still possible to do so. If liberalism had not hindered them, they would, so they believe, have bloodily nipped the revolutionary movements in the bud. Revolutionary ideas had been able to take root and flourish only because of the tolerance they had been accorded by their opponents, whose will power had been enfeebled by a regard for liberal principles that, as events subsequently proved, was overscrupulous." He continues by defining fascism as follows:

The fundamental idea of these movements—which, from the name of the most grandiose and tightly disciplined among them, the Italian, may, in general, be designated as Fascist—consists in the proposal to make use of the same unscrupulous methods in the struggle against the Third International as the latter employs against its opponents. The Third International seeks to exterminate its adversaries and their ideas in the same way that the hygienist strives to exterminate a pestilential bacillus; it considers itself in no way bound by the terms of any compact that it may conclude with opponents, and it deems any crime, any lie, and any calumny permissible in carrying on its struggle. The Fascists, at least in principle, profess the same intentions.

=== Tom Nichols ===
Writing in The Atlantic, Tom Nichols, an academic specialist on international affairs, said about fascism:

Fascism is not mere oppression. It is a more holistic ideology that elevates the state over the individual (except for a sole leader, around whom there is a cult of personality), glorifies Hypernationalism and racism, worships military power, hates liberal democracy, and wallows in nostalgia and historical grievances. It asserts that all public activity should serve the regime, and that all power must be gathered in the fist of the leader and exercised only by his party.

=== Ernst Nolte ===
Ernst Nolte, a German historian and Hegelian philosopher, defined fascism in 1965 as a reaction against other political movements, especially Marxism: "Fascism is anti-Marxism which seeks to destroy the enemy by the evolvement of a radically opposed and yet related ideology and by the use of almost identical and yet typically modified methods, always, however, within the unyielding framework of national self-assertion and autonomy." Nolte also argued that fascism functioned at three levels: in the world of politics as a form of opposition to Marxism, at the sociological level in opposition to bourgeois values, and in the "meta political" world as "resistance to transcendence" ("transcendence" in German can be translated as the "spirit of modernity").

=== Kevin Passmore ===
Kevin Passmore, a history lecturer at Cardiff University, defines fascism in his 2002 book Fascism: A Very Short Introduction. His definition is directly descended from the view put forth by Ernesto Laclau, and is also informed by a desire to adjust for what he believes are shortcomings in Marxist, Weberian and other analyses of fascism:

Fascism is a set of ideologies and practices that seeks to place the nation, defined in exclusive biological, cultural, and/or historical terms, above all other sources of loyalty, and to create a mobilized national community. Fascist nationalism is reactionary in that it entails implacable hostility to socialism and feminism, for they are seen as prioritizing class or gender rather than nation. This is why fascism is a movement of the extreme right. Fascism is also a movement of the radical right because the defeat of socialism and feminism and the creation of the mobilized nation are held to depend upon the advent to power of a new elite acting in the name of the people, headed by a charismatic leader, and embodied in a mass, militarized party. Fascists are pushed towards conservatism by common hatred of socialism and feminism, but are prepared to override conservative interests – family, property, religion, the universities, the civil service – where the interests of the nation are considered to require it. Fascist radicalism also derives from a desire to assuage discontent by accepting specific demands of the labour and women's movements, so long as these demands accord with the national priority. Fascists seek to ensure the harmonization of workers' and women's interests with those of the nation by mobilizing them within special sections of the party and/or within a corporate system. Access to these organizations and to the benefits they confer upon members depends on the individual's national, political, and/or racial characteristics. All aspects of fascist policy are suffused with ultranationalism.

=== Robert Paxton ===
Robert Paxton, a professor emeritus at Columbia University, defines fascism in his 2004 book The Anatomy of Fascism as:

A form of political behavior marked by obsessive preoccupation with community decline, humiliation or victimhood and by compensatory cults of unity, energy and purity, in which a mass-based party of committed nationalist militants, working in uneasy but effective collaboration with traditional elites, abandons democratic liberties and pursues with redemptive violence and without ethical or legal restraints goals of internal cleansing and external expansion.

In the same book, Paxton also argues that fascism's foundations lie in a set of "mobilizing passions" rather than an elaborated doctrine. He argues these passions can explain much of the behaviour of fascists:

- a sense of overwhelming crisis beyond the reach of any traditional solutions;
- the primacy of the group, toward which one has duties superior to every right, whether individual or universal, and the subordination of the individual to it;
- the belief that one's group is a victim, a sentiment that justifies any action, without legal or moral limits, against its enemies, both internal and external;
- dread of the group's decline under the corrosive effects of individualistic liberalism, class conflict, and alien influences;
- the need for closer integration of a purer community, by consent if possible, or by exclusionary violence if necessary;
- the need for authority by natural chiefs (always male), culminating in a national chieftain who alone is capable of incarnating the group's historical destiny;
- the superiority of the leader's instincts over abstract and universal reason;
- the beauty of violence and the efficacy of will, when they are devoted to the group's success;
- the right of the chosen people to dominate others without restraint from any kind of human or divine law, right being decided by the sole criterion of the group's prowess within a Darwinian struggle.

Paxton at first hesitated in embracing the application of the term fascism to the Trump movement—initially diagnosing the phenomena as an advanced and fairly unique form of populist plutocracy. Paxton later recanted his hesitation to use the term to describe Trumpism, in 2021, revising his opinion to state that—in view of Trump's performance and of his January 6th denialism—he thinks that Trumpism is a form of fascism, noting that, "The label now seems not just acceptable but necessary."

=== Stanley G. Payne ===
Historian of fascism Stanley G. Payne created a lengthy list of characteristics to identify fascism in 1995: in summary form, there are three main strands. First, Payne's "fascist negations" refers to such typical policies as anti-communism and anti-liberalism. Second, "fascist goals" include a nationalist dictatorship and an expanded empire. Third, "fascist style", is seen in its emphasis on violence and authoritarianism, and its exultation of men above women, and young above old.

- A. Ideology and Goals:
  - Espousal of an idealist, vitalist, and voluntaristic philosophy, normally involving the attempt to realize a new modern, self-determined, and secular culture
  - Creation of a new nationalist authoritarian state not based on traditional principles or models
  - Organization of a new highly regulated, multi-class, integrated national economic structure, whether called national corporatist, national socialist, or national syndicalist
  - Positive evaluation and use of, or willingness to use, violence and war
  - The goal of empire, expansion, or a radical change in the nation's relationship with other powers
- B. The Fascist Negations:
  - Antiliberalism
  - Anticommunism
  - Anticonservatism (though with the understanding that fascist groups were willing to undertake temporary alliances with other sectors, more commonly with the right)
- C. Style and Organization:
  - Attempted mass mobilization with militarization of political relationships and style and with the goal of a mass single party militia
  - Emphasis on aesthetic structure of meetings, symbols, and political liturgy, stressing emotional and mystical aspects
  - Extreme stress on the masculine principle and male dominance, while espousing a strongly organic view of society
  - Exaltation of youth above other phases of life, emphasizing the conflict of the generations, at least in effecting the initial political transformation
  - Specific tendency toward an authoritarian, charismatic, personal style of command, whether or not the command is to some degree initially elective

=== Jason Stanley ===
In 2020, National Public Radio interviewed Jason Stanley, a professor of philosophy at Yale University, regarding his book How Fascism Works: The Politics of Us and Them. Stanley defined fascism as "a cult of the leader who promises national restoration in the face of humiliation brought on by supposed communists, Marxists and minorities and immigrants who are supposedly posing a threat to the character and the history of a nation" and further observed that, "The leader proposes that only he can solve it and all of his political opponents are enemies or traitors."

In his book, How Fascism Works, Stanley focuses on fascist politics in much more detail than fascist states, as he says the latter vary significantly by time and location and are only loosely characterized by "ultra nationalism of some variety (ethnic, religious, cultural), with the nation represented in the person of an authoritarian leader who speaks on its behalf". However, the specific political tactics first used to attain power in a democracy are more similar and more easily characterized. These tactics are designed to divide the population into an "Us" (e.g., native-born residents) and a "Them" (e.g., immigrants) and to justify a "targeting of ideological enemies and the freeing of all restraints in combating them".

Jason Stanley uses the United States (under Donald Trump), India (under Modi), Hungary (under Orbán), and Brazil (under Bolsonaro) to illustrate the following tactics typical of fascist politics:

1. The mythical past—used to invoke a nostalgia for a fictional time when the nation was great as it was not yet sullied by the "Other".
2. Propaganda—to attack enemies, to justify violence, to justify laws against "Them" and to support the authoritarian leader.
3. Anti-intellectualism—to attack the media, universities, and scientists when they contradict the strong man's authority.
4. Unreality—supporting conspiracy theories that tarnish the "Other" along with an outright denial of facts when convenient.
5. Hierarchy—espousing a "natural order" where the "Us" are hardworking, moral, law-abiding and productive members of society, while the "Other" is not.
6. Victimhood—casting "Us" as victims of "Them", who are taking resources from "Us" and demanding special rights.
7. Law and order—using laws to justify violence, oppression, and expulsion of the "Other".
8. Sexual anxiety—as the "Other" embraces non-traditional approaches to sexuality,
9. Appeals to the heartland—as rural communities are often more homogeneous and conservative (more "Us") while urban cities are often more diverse, cosmopolitan (more "Them").
10. Dismantling of public welfare and unity—by casting aside safety net programs as unfair giveaways to "Them", who are not working, as opposed to "Us", who are.

=== Zeev Sternhell ===
Zeev Sternhell, a historian and professor of political science, described fascism as a reaction against modernity and a backlash against the changes it had caused to society, as a "rejection of the prevailing systems: liberalism and Marxism, positivism and democracy". At the same time, Sternhell argued that part of what made Fascism unique was that it wanted to retain the benefits of progress and modernism while rejecting the values and social changes that had come with it; Fascism embraced liberal market-based economics and the violent revolutionary rhetoric of Marxism, but rejected their philosophical principles.

=== Christian Fuchs ===
Social scientist Christian Fuchs, in his book Digital Fascism, offers a definition of fascism that is not anchored on historical forms of fascism due to his demand to include recent, atypical appearances of fascism under this term. He defines fascism as:

anti-democratic, anti-socialist, and terrorist ideology, practice, and mode of organization of groups, institutions, and society that is based on the combination of (a) the leadership principle, (b) nationalism, (c) the friend/enemy scheme, and (d) militant patriarchy (the idealization of the soldier, the practice of patriarchy, the subordination of women, war, violence and terror as political means) and the use of terror against constructed enemies, aims at establishing a fascist society that is built on the use of terror and the institutionalization of the four fascist principles in society, tries to mobilize individuals who fear the loss of property, status, power, reputation in light of the antagonisms as its supporters, and plays an ideological role in capitalist and class societies by blaming scapegoats for society’s ills and presenting society’s problems as an antagonism between the nation and foreigners and enemies of the nation so that fascism distracts attention from the systemic roles of class and capitalism in society’s problems and from the class contradiction between capital and labour. Fascism often propagates a one-dimensional, one-sided, and personalizing "anti-capitalism" that constructs the nation as political fetish and an antagonism between the unity of a nation’s capital and labour on the one side and a particular form of capital or economy or production or community on the other side that is presented as destroying the nation’s economic, political, and cultural survival.

== By Marxists ==
Marxists argue that fascism represents the last attempt of a ruling class (specifically, the capitalist bourgeoisie) to preserve its grip on power in the face of an imminent proletarian revolution. Marxists believe fascist movements are not necessarily created by the ruling class, but they can only gain political power with the help of that class and with funding from big business. Once in power, the fascists serve the interests of their benefactors.

=== Amadeo Bordiga ===
Amadeo Bordiga argued that fascism is merely another form of bourgeois rule, on the same level as bourgeois democracy or traditional monarchy, and that it is not particularly reactionary or otherwise exceptional.

=== Bertolt Brecht ===
German playwright Bertolt Brecht describes fascism as: "a historic phase of capitalism" and "...the nakedest, most shameless, most oppressive, and most treacherous form of capitalism" (1935).

=== Georgi Dimitrov ===
Georgi Dimitrov, a Bulgarian Communist, was a theorist of capitalism who expanded Lenin's ideas and the work of Clara Zetkin.

Delivering an official report to the 7th World Congress of the Communist Third International in August 1935, Georgi Dimitrov cited the definition of fascism formulated with the help of Clara Zetkin at the Third Plenum as "the open, terrorist dictatorship of the most reactionary, most chauvinistic, and most imperialist elements of finance capital".

According to Dimitrov:

"Fascism is not a form of state power "standing above both classes – the proletariat and the bourgeoisie," as Otto Bauer, for instance, has asserted. It is not "the revolt of the petty bourgeoisie which has captured the machinery of the state," as the British Socialist Brailsford declares. No, fascism is not a power standing above class, nor government of the petty bourgeoisie or the lumpen-proletariat over finance capital. Fascism is the power of finance capital itself. It is the organization of terrorist vengeance against the working class and the revolutionary section of the peasantry and intelligentsia. In foreign policy, fascism is jingoism in its most brutal form, fomenting bestial hatred of other nations.... The development of fascism, and the fascist dictatorship itself, assume different forms in different countries, according to historical, social and economic conditions and to the national peculiarities, and the international position of the given country."

=== György Lukács ===
Hungarian philosopher György Lukács in his works The Destruction of Reason (Die Zerstörung der Vernunft, 1952) and Zur Kritik der faschistischen Ideologie (1989) considers the ideology of fascism as the "demagogic synthesis" of all the irrationalist trends of the 19th and early 20th centuries, such as the reaction against the ideas of the Enlightenment and the French Revolution, the Romantic critique of capitalism (Carlyle) which after 1848 turned into "indirect apologetics" of capitalism (Nietzsche), anti-democratic or "aristocratic epistemology" (Lukács' term for philosophies that considered knowledge to be the privilege of an elite, first expressed in Schelling's concept of intellectual intuition and culminating in the metaphysical views of Henri Bergson), emphasis on myth and mysticism, the rejection of humanism, a cult of personality around the leader, the subjugation of reason to instinct, the conception of the nation and people in clearly biological terms, the glorification of war, etc.. According to Lukács, the historical significance of Hitler and Mussolini lies not in that they brought anything new to the ideological field, but in that they condensed all existing reactionary and irrationalist ideologies of the past and through their successful national and social demagogy brought them "from the scholar's study and intellectual coteries to the streets".

=== Luis Britto García ===
Essayist Luis Britto García defines fascism in his essay Fascismo, saying that economic crisis is "the mother of fascism" while outlining a series of eight characteristics:

1. "Fascism is the absolute complicity between big capital and the State": When the interests of capitalism are aligned with politics, fascism approaches.
2. "Fascism denies the class struggle, but it is the armed arm of capital in it": Fascists fear monger lower classes about impending economic crises and enlists such individuals into their ranks to avoid competition with unions, workers and other social groups.
3. "Fascism summons the masses, but it is elitist": Though appealing to the lower classes, aristocracies and the upper-class enforce an authoritarian hierarchy through fascism to maintain their own standing.
4. "Fascism is racist": Cultures and races are targeted by fascists to support their purposes.
5. "Fascism and capitalism have abhorrent faces that need masks": Revolutionary language, plans and symbolism are stolen and repurposed by fascists.
6. "Fascism is blessed": Some religious groups typically support fascist movements, providing their blessing.
7. "Fascism is misogynistic": Women are not represented as being independent or recognized for their achievements in fascism.
8. "Fascism is anti-intellectual": Noting the scientific progress achieved by progressivism, Britto Garcia writes, "Fascism does not invent, it recycles. It only believes in yesterday, an imaginary yesterday that never existed."

=== Leon Trotsky ===
One of Russian Marxist revolutionary Leon Trotsky’s earliest attempts at trying to define fascism was in November 1931 when he wrote a letter to a friend titled "What is Fascism". In it, Trotsky wrote, in what is as much description as analysis:

The Fascist movement in Italy was a spontaneous movement of large masses, with new leaders from the rank and file. It is a plebeian movement in origin, directed and financed by big capitalist powers. It issued forth from the petty bourgeoisie, the slum proletariat and even to a certain extent, from the proletarian masses, Mussolini, a former socialist, is a "self-made" man arising from this movement.

The movement in Germany is analogous mostly to the Italian movement. It is a mass movement, with its leaders employing a great deal of socialist demagogy. This is necessary for the creation of the mass movement.

The genuine basis is the petty bourgeoisie. In Italy it is a very large base – the petty bourgeoisie of the towns and cities, and the peasantry. In Germany likewise, there is a large base for Fascism. In England there is less of that base because the proletariat is the overwhelming majority of the population: the peasant or farming stratum only an insignificant section.

It may be said, and this is true to a certain extent, that the new middle class, the functionaries of the state, the private administrators, etc., etc., can constitute such a base. But this is a new question that must be analyzed. This is a supposition. It is necessary to analyze just what it will be. It is necessary to foresee the Fascist movement growing from this or that element. But this is only a perspective which is controlled by events. I am not affirming that it is impossible for a Fascist movement to develop in England or for a Mosley or someone else to become a dictator. This is a question for the future. It is a far-fetched possibility.

To speak of it now as an imminent danger is not a prognosis but a mere prophecy. In order to be capable of foreseeing anything in the direction of Fascism, it is necessary to have a definition of that idea. What is Fascism? What is its base, its form and its characteristics? How will its development take place?

In Trotsky’s posthumously published 1944 tract, Fascism: What It Is and How to Fight It, he noted: "The historic function of fascism is to smash the working class, destroy its organizations, and stifle political liberties when the capitalists find themselves unable to govern and dominate with the help of democratic machinery."

=== Clara Zetkin ===
An early study of fascism was written by Clara Zetkin for the Third Enlarged Plenum of the Executive Committee of the Communist International in 1923:

Fascism is the concentrated expression of the general offensive undertaken by the world bourgeoisie against the proletariat.... fascism [is] an expression of the decay and disintegration of the capitalist economy and as a symptom of the bourgeois state's dissolution. We can combat fascism only if we grasp that it rouses and sweeps along broad social masses who have lost the earlier security of their existence and with it, often, their belief in social order.... It will be much easier for us to defeat Fascism if we clearly and distinctly study its nature. Hitherto there have been extremely vague ideas upon this subject not only among the large masses of the workers, but even among the revolutionary vanguard of the proletariat and the Communists.... The Fascist leaders are not a small and exclusive caste; they extend deeply into wide elements of the population.

== By others ==
=== Laurence W. Britt ===
In the Spring 2003 issue of the secular humanist magazine Free Inquiry, Laurence W. Britt, who is described as "a retired international businessperson, writer, and commentator" published "Fascism Anyone?", which included a list of 14 defining characteristics of fascism. The list has since been widely circulated in both modified and unmodified forms. In a newspaper interview in 2004, Britt expanded and clarified the meaning of some of the points in his list, and discussed how they applied to the United States at that time.

The headers for Britt's original list, without his sometimes extensive explanations, are:

1. "Powerful and continuing expressions of nationalism"
2. "Disdain for the importance of human rights"
3. "Identification of enemies/scapegoats as a unifying cause"
4. "The supremacy of the military/avid militarism"
5. "Rampant sexism"
6. "A controlled mass media"
7. "Obsession with national security"
8. "Religion and ruling elite tied together"
9. "Power of corporations protected"
10. "Power of labor suppressed or eliminated"
11. "Disdain and suppression of intellectuals and the arts"
12. "Obsession with crime and punishment"
13. "Rampant cronyism and corruption"
14. "Fraudulent elections"

=== Naomi Klein and Astra Taylor ===
Author Naomi Klein and documentary filmmaker Astra Taylor describe fascism as "capitalism with bared teeth":

The pattern is clear: fascism emerges in moments of systemic crisis, conjoining popular passions with traditional authority and protecting elite power against the threat of economic redistribution from below. That was true after the Civil War and emancipation in the US South, it was true after World War I and the Great Depression in Europe, and it was true in Latin America, amid economic stagnation and hyperinflation in the early 1970s. Rather than address crises at their root, fascism shakes off all democratic niceties and crushes the threat of a fairer economic order, while directing mass anger and frustration toward vulnerable scapegoats. Fascism is capitalism with bared teeth.

=== George Orwell ===
Anti-fascist author George Orwell describes fascism in economic terms in a 1941 essay, "Shopkeepers At War":

Fascism, at any rate the German version, is a form of capitalism that borrows from Socialism just such features as will make it efficient for war purposes... It is a planned system geared to a definite purpose, world-conquest, and not allowing any private interest, either of capitalist or worker, to stand in its way.

Writing for Tribune magazine in 1944, Orwell stated:

...It is not easy, for instance, to fit Germany and Japan into the same framework, and it is even harder with some of the small states which are describable as Fascist. It is usually assumed, for instance, that Fascism is inherently warlike, that it thrives in an atmosphere of war hysteria and can only solve its economic problems by means of war preparation or foreign conquests. But clearly this is not true of, say, Portugal or the various South American dictatorships. Or again, antisemitism is supposed to be one of the distinguishing marks of Fascism; but some Fascist movements are not antisemitic. Learned controversies, reverberating for years on end in American magazines, have not even been able to determine whether or not Fascism is a form of capitalism. But still, when we apply the term ‘Fascism’ to Germany or Japan or Mussolini's Italy, we know broadly what we mean.

See also Orwell's comment in the "Fascist" as an insult section below.

=== Franklin D. Roosevelt ===
American President Franklin D. Roosevelt, who led the US into war against the fascist Axis powers, wrote about fascism:

The first truth is that the liberty of a democracy is not safe if the people tolerate the growth of private power to a point where it becomes stronger than their democratic state itself. That, in its essence, is fascism – ownership of government by an individual, by a group, or by any other controlling private power.

=== Council on Foreign Relations ===
According to the Council on Foreign Relations, many experts see fascism as a mass political movement centered around extreme nationalism, militarism, and the placement of national interests above those of the individual. Fascist regimes often advocate for the overthrow of institutions that they view as "liberal decay" while simultaneously promoting traditional values. They believe in the supremacy of certain peoples and use it to justify the persecution of other groups. Fascist leaders often maintain a cult of personality and seek to generate enthusiasm for the regime by rallying massive crowds. This contrasts with authoritarian governments, which also centralize power and suppress dissent, but want their subjects to remain passive and demobilized.

== "Fascist" as an insult ==
Some have argued that the terms fascism and fascist have become hopelessly vague since the World War II period, and that today it is little more than a pejorative used by supporters of various political views to insult their opponents. The word fascist is sometimes used to denigrate people, institutions, or groups that would not describe themselves as ideologically fascist, and that may not fall within the formal definition of the word. As a political epithet, fascist has been used in an anti-authoritarian sense to emphasize the common ideology of governmental suppression of individual freedom. In this sense, the word fascist is intended to mean oppressive, intolerant, chauvinist, genocidal, dictatorial, racist, or aggressive.

George Orwell wrote in 1944:

...the word 'Fascism' is almost entirely meaningless. In conversation, of course, it is used even more wildly than in print. I have heard it applied to farmers, shopkeepers, Social Credit, corporal punishment, fox-hunting, bull-fighting, the 1922 Committee, the 1941 Committee, Kipling, Gandhi, Chiang Kai-Shek, homosexuality, Priestley's broadcasts, Youth Hostels, astrology, women, dogs and I do not know what else ... Except for the relatively small number of Fascist sympathizers, almost any English person would accept 'bully' as a synonym for 'Fascist'. That is about as near to a definition as this much-abused word has come.

== See also ==
- Fasces as an analogy for strong bundles of weaker individual parts
- Fascism and ideology
- Palingenetic ultranationalism
