= Comparison of English dictionaries =

This is a comparison of English dictionaries, which are dictionaries about the English language. The dictionaries listed here are categorized into "full-size" dictionaries (which extensively cover the language, and are targeted to native speakers), "collegiate" (which are smaller, and often contain other biographical or geographical information useful to college students), and "learner's" (which are even smaller, targeted to English language learners, and which all use the International Phonetic Alphabet to indicate pronunciation).

== Full-size ==
These dictionaries generally aim for extensive coverage of the language for native speakers. They typically only cover one variety of English.

Title	Publisher	First published	Latest edition	Date	Pages	Entries (approx.)	Words and definitions (approx.)	Main dialect	Pronunciation guide
American Heritage Dictionary	Houghton Mifflin Harcourt	1969	5th (ISBN 0-547-04101-2)	2011	2,074	200,000 (Note: The third edition contained "more than 200,000 boldface forms" (entries). The fourth and fifth editions each added roughly 10,000 "new words and senses". It is not clear how many of these were new words.)		American	Diacritical
Encarta Webster's Dictionary of the English Language (Note: First edition titled Encarta World English Dictionary. Second edition also published in the UK as Bloomsbury English Dictionary.)	Bloomsbury	1999	2nd (ISBN 1-58234-510-4, 0-7475-6243-1)	2004	2,166	100,000	400,000		IPA
Canadian Oxford Dictionary	Oxford University Press	1998	2nd (ISBN 978-0-19-541816-3)	2004	1,830		300,000	Canadian	Diacritical
The Chambers Dictionary	Chambers Harrap	1872	13th (ISBN 978-1-4736-0225-0)	2014	1,920	62,500 (Note: 12th edition)	620,000 (Note: 12th edition)	British	Diacritical
Collins English Dictionary	HarperCollins	1979	14th (ISBN 978-0-00-851134-0)	2023	2,336	223,000	732,000	British	IPA
Concise Oxford English Dictionary	Oxford University Press	1911	12th (ISBN 978-0-19-960108-0)	2011	1,728		240,000	British	IPA
Macquarie Dictionary	Macquarie	1981	9th (ISBN 978-1-76126-774-1)	2023	1,856			Australian	IPA
New Oxford American Dictionary	Oxford University Press	2001	3rd (ISBN 0-19-539288-4)	2010	2,096		350,000	American	Diacritical
Oxford Dictionary of English	Oxford University Press	1998	3rd (ISBN 0-19-957112-0)	2010	2,112		350,000	British	IPA
Oxford English Dictionary	Oxford University Press	1895	2nd (20 vols., ISBN 0-19-861186-2)	1989	21,730	291,500	615,100	British	IPA
Random House Webster's	Random House	1966	2nd (rev., ISBN 978-0-375-42599-8)	2002	2,258	315,000		American	Diacritical
Shorter Oxford English Dictionary	Oxford University Press	1933	6th (2 vols., ISBN 978-0-19-920687-2)	2007	3,804	220,000 (Note: 4th edition)	600,000	British	IPA
Webster's Third New International Dictionary	Merriam-Webster	1961	3rd (ISBN 0-87-779201-1)	2002	2,820	476,000		American	Diacritical

== Collegiate ==
These dictionaries generally contain fewer entries (and fewer definitions per entry) than their full-size counterparts but may contain additional material, such as biographical or geopolitical information, that would be useful to a college student. They may be revised more often and thus contain more up to date usage. Sometimes the term collegiate or college is used merely to indicate a physically smaller, more economically printed dictionary.

Title	Publisher	First published	Latest edition	Date	Pages	Entries (approx.)	Main dialect	Pronunciation guide
The American Heritage College Dictionary	Houghton Mifflin Harcourt	2002	4th (Note: The 2010 "4th edition" of The American Heritage College Dictionary (ISBN 0-547-24766-4) is the second revision of the original "4th edition" published in 2002; it was originally derived from the 4th edition of The American Heritage Dictionary of the English Language, which was published in 2000.) (ISBN 0-547-24766-4)	2010	1,664		American	Diacritical
Merriam-Webster's Collegiate Dictionary	Merriam-Webster	1898	12th (ISBN 978-0-87779-406-6)	2025	1,856	165,000	American	Diacritical
Webster's New World College Dictionary	HarperCollins	1953	5th, revised (ISBN 0358126614)	2020	1,728	163,000	American	Diacritical

== Learner's ==
These dictionaries generally contain fewer entries than full-size or collegiate dictionaries but contain additional information that would be useful to a learner of English, such as more extensive usage notes, example sentences or phrases, collocations, and both British and American pronunciations (sometimes multiple variants of the latter). In addition, definitions are usually restricted to a simpler core vocabulary than that expected of a native speaker. All use the IPA to indicate pronunciation.

Title	Publisher	First published	Latest edition	Date	Pages	Usage examples (approx.)	Main dialect
Cambridge Advanced Learner's Dictionary	Cambridge University Press	2003 (Note: Cambridge Advanced Learner's Dictionary was originally published as Cambridge International Dictionary of English in 1995.)	4th (ISBN 9781107619500)	2013 (24.06)	1,856	140,000	British
Collins COBUILD Advanced Dictionary	Collins Cobuild	1987	10th (ISBN 9780008444907)	2023 (13.04)	1,920		British
Collins COBUILD Advanced American English Dictionary	Collins Cobuild	2006	3rd (ISBN 9780008607784)	2023 (09.11)	1,680		American
Longman Dictionary of Contemporary English	Pearson-Longman	1978	6th (ISBN 9781447954194)	2014 (17.04)	2,224	165,000	British
Macmillan English Dictionary for Advanced Learners	Macmillan Education	2002	2nd (ISBN 9781405025263)	2007	1,748		British
Merriam-Webster's Advanced Learner's English Dictionary	Merriam-Webster	2008	2nd (ISBN 9780877797364)	2016 (01.10)	1,994	160,000	American
Oxford Advanced Learner's Dictionary	Oxford University Press	1948	10th (ISBN 9780194799485)	2020 (09.01)	1,960	185,000	British

== See also ==
- List of Canadian English dictionaries
- List of dictionaries by number of words
