= Susan Hunston =

British linguist

Susan Elizabeth Hunston (born 1953) is a British linguist. She received her PhD in English under the supervision of Michael Hoey at the University of Birmingham in 1989. She does research in the areas of corpus linguistics and applied linguistics. She is one of the primary developers of the Pattern Grammar model of linguistic analysis, which is a way of describing the syntactic environments of individual words, based on studying their occurrences in large sets of authentic examples, i.e. language corpora. The Pattern Grammar model was developed as part of the COBUILD project, where Hunston worked for several years as a senior grammarian for the Collins Cobuild English Dictionary.

Having earlier taught at Mindanao State University in the Philippines, at the National University of Singapore, and at the University of Surrey, Hunston is currently a Professor of English Language in the Department of English Language and Applied Linguistics at the University of Birmingham. She has served as the Head of the School of English, Drama and American and Canadian Studies at the University of Birmingham. In addition to research and teaching, she is a co-editor, along with Carol A. Chapell, of the Cambridge Applied Linguistics book series.

== Awards and distinctions ==
Hunston is a Fellow of the Academy of Social Sciences. She served as the Chair of the British Association for Applied Linguistics from 2006 to 2009. She serves on the executive board of the International Association of Applied Linguistics, a non-governmental organization (NGO) that has formal consultative relations with UNESCO ("the 'intellectual' agency of the United Nations") and which is devoted to supporting applied linguistics in developing countries. She was appointed Officer of the Order of the British Empire (OBE) in the 2017 New Year Honours for services to higher education and applied linguistics.

== Key publications ==
=== Books ===
- 2011. Susan Hunston. Corpus Approaches to Evaluation: phraseology and evaluative language. Routledge.
- 2007. Susan Hunston and G. Thompson (Eds.). System and Corpus: Exploring Connections. Equinox Publishing.
- 2002. Susan Hunston. Corpora in Applied Linguistics. Cambridge University Press.
- 2000. Susan Hunston and G. Thompson. Evaluation in Text: Authorial Stance and the Construction of Discourse. Oxford Univ. Press.
- 2000. Susan Hunston and G. Francis. Pattern Grammar: A Corpus-Driven Approach to the Lexical Grammar of English. John Benjamins.
- 1998. G. Francis, S. Hunston, E. Manning. Collins COBUILD Grammar patterns: Nouns and adjectives. Harper Collins.
- 1997. G. Francis, E. Manning, S. Hunston. Collins COBUILD Verbs: Patterns & Practice. Harper Collins.

=== Articles and chapters ===
- 2012. Susan Hunston. Pattern Grammar. The Encyclopedia of Applied Linguistics. Wiley.
- 2007. Susan Hunston. Semantic Prosody Revisited. International Journal of Corpus Linguistics, 12(2) 249-268.
- 2006. Susan Hunston. Corpus linguistics. Linguistics 7(2) 215-244.
