= List of dictionaries by number of words =

This is a list of dictionaries considered authoritative or complete by approximate number of total words, or headwords, included number of words in a language.

Largest dictionary in the given language

Language	Approx. no. of headwords	Approx. no. of definitions	Dictionary	Notes
Tamil	1,553,079		Sorkuvai	An online open dictionary run by the Tamil Nadu government. The dictionary contains 1,549,495 words.
Korean	1,186,764		Urimalsaem	Online open dictionary run by the South Korean government agency National Institute of Korean Language, including North Korean dialects (66,172 words).
English	885,298	1,804,904	English Wiktionary	Contains 1,453,952 total entries and 923,306 gloss entries. Out of 1,695,049 total definitions, there are 968,139 gloss definitions and 726,910 form definitions.
Portuguese	818,000		Aulete Digital	Online dictionary with over 818,000 entries.
Finnish	800,000		RedFox Pro	Online dictionary. The free version has over 300,000 Finnish words and the Pro version has over 800,000 Finnish words. The dictionary has agglomerated other dictionaries, such as technical ones, and the largest set comes from Wordnet. This dictionary essentially does not include inflections.
English	520,000	888,251	Oxford English Dictionary	OED also contains 3,927,862 quotations and 821,712 historical thesaurus entries.
Korean	511,282		Standard Korean Language Dictionary	Contains 511,282 entries.
Swedish	500,000		Svenska Akademiens ordbok, Swedish Academy	
Italian	500,000		Grande Dizionario Hoepli Italiano	The number of "sayable and writable" word-forms is estimated at over 2 million.
Japanese	500,000		Nihon Kokugo Daijiten	
Lithuanian	500,000		Lietuvių kalbos žodynas (Academic Dictionary of Lithuanian)	The largest dictionary of the Lithuanian language: consists of 22 000 pages, includes more than 11 million words with quotations from all kinds of writing and dialect records between 1547 and 2001. Accessible online at www.lkz.lt.
English	470,000		Webster's Third New International Dictionary and Addenda Section	Contains 470,000 entries.
Northern Kurdish	411,550		Kurdish Wiktionary	Contains 411,550 entries (160,130 lemma, 237,294 non-lemma) in Northern Kurdish, among a total of 1,004,698 entries in 3837 languages.
French	408,078		French Wiktionary	Contains more than 408,000 lemma, associated to more than 636,500 definitions and 1,880,500 inflections, distributed other 1,924,200 entries.
Croatian	400,000		Rječnik hrvatskoga ili srpskoga jezika	Published from 1880 to 1976 in 97 fascicles collected into 23 volumes under the auspices of the Yugoslav Academy of Sciences and Arts, estimated at a minimum of 400,000 words by Dragica Malić. Includes only words found in the Shtokavian dialect; words from Chakavian and Kajkavian dialects are excluded.
Dutch	400,000		Woordenboek der Nederlandsche Taal	The 43 volumes of the WNT (including three supplements) consist of 49,255 pages, describing Dutch words from 1500 to 1976.
Chinese	378,103		Hanyu Da Cidian	The 3rd edition of the digital version contains 18,014 single-character words, 336,706 compound words, 23,383 idioms (chengyu), 504,040 definitions, and 861,956 examples.
Finnish	350,000		Suomen murteiden sanakirja (in progress)	Suomen murteiden sanakirja (SMS) will include 350,000 words from different dialects, with well-documented definitions, based on the archives (Suomen murteiden sana-arkisto) of 400,000 words, with over 8 million definitions.
Persian	343,466		Dehkhoda Dictionary, 1998, ISBN 9789640396025	The original series initially consisted of 3 million records (Persian: فیش (French: fiche) or برگه "barge") (up to 100 meanings/records for each word or proper noun) until Dehkhoda's death in March 1956, and currently contains 343,466 entries that, according to the latest digital release of the dictionary by Tehran University Press (version 3.0) are based on an ever-growing library of over 2,300 volumes in lexicology and various other scientific fields.
Norwegian	330,000		Norsk Ordbok	The finished dictionary has about 330,000 headwords, whereas the corpus it's built upon contains about 500,000 words in total.
German	330,000		Deutsches Wörterbuch	330,000 words in use since the mid-fifteenth century.
Turkish	316,000		Ötüken Türkçe Sözlük	Turkish dictionary (Old and Middle Turkic, Ottoman and Modern Turkish), includes 316,000 entries.
Dutch	300,000		Etymologisch woordenboek van het Nederlands	
Norwegian	300,000		Tanums store rettskrivningsordbok (10. utgave)	A dictionary of orthography.
Ukrainian	300,000		Ukrainian lexicon of the late 18th — early 21st centuries: dictionary-index: in 3 volumes	Lexical dictionary..
Urdu	286,563	823,743	Rekhta Dictionary	Rekhta Dictionary, an initiative of Rekhta Foundation is a multi-lingual dictionary available in three scripts, i.e. Urdu, Devanagari and Roman.
Gujarati	281,377		Bhagavadgomandal	2.81 lakh words and their meanings in 9 volumes. Also serves as an encyclopedia with almost 8.22 lakh words.
Romanian	280,000		dexonline	Online dictionary. Project of digitisation of 67 general, specialty and archaic dictionaries. Launched in 2001. As of 2023, it contained over 280,000 unique words and 1,065,000 definitions.
Serbian	266,000		Dictionary of Serbo-Croatian Literary and Vernacular Language (Rečnik srpskohrvatskog književnog i narodnog jezika)	It is an Academy-level dictionary, currently consisting of 22 published volumes with approximately 266,000 words. The completed work is expected to contain around 500,000 words. Some academics working on the dictionary like Vasa Pavković estimate that the dictionary will have between 550,000 and 600,000 terms.
Urdu	264,000		Urdu Lughat	
Ukrainian	253,000		Великий орфографічний словник сучасної української лексики	A dictionary of orthography. Contains 253,000 entries (253,000 words).
Czech	250,000		Příruční slovník jazyka českého	Nine volumes of this dictionary were printed in years 1935–1957. They contain about 250,000 words, their meanings and example usage from literature. The dictionary is available online.
Portuguese	228,000	382,000	Houaiss Dictionary of the Portuguese Language	228,000 entries and 382,000 meanings.
Belarusian	223,000		Вялікі слоўнік беларускай мовы: арфаграфія, акцэнтуацыя, парадыгматыка	
English	223,000	732,000	Collins English Dictionary	More than 732,000 words, meanings, and phrases (14th edition).
Russian	220,000	250,000	Толковый словарь живого великорусского языка	The 3rd edition by Baudouin de Courtenay contains about 250,000 entries (220,000 words and 30,000 proverbs).
Indonesian	210,491	232,094	Kamus Besar Bahasa Indonesia, 6th edition, 2024	
Finnish	201,000		Nykysuomen sanakirja, 1961	Nykysuomen sanakirja can be translated to The Dictionary of Modern Finnish or The Dictionary of Contemporary Finnish, but the language can be quite dated; the dictionary only reflects the language as it was no later than 1961. Even though it has been published again, it has not been updated. The dictionary contains over 201,000 headwords in six volumes. For modern language, The New Dictionary of Modern Finnish is more relevant.
English	200,000		The American Heritage Dictionary of the English Language, Fifth Edition	The third edition contained "more than 200,000 boldface forms" (entries). The fourth and fifth editions each added roughly 10,000 additional "new words and senses". It is not clear how many of these were new words.
German	200,000		Großes Wörterbuch der deutschen Sprache	Dictionary by the Berlin-Brandenburg Academy of Sciences and Humanities of over 200,000 contemporary words.
Norwegian (bokmål)	200,000		Det Norske Akademis ordbok	The Norwegian Academy Dictionary contains more than 200,000 entries and more than 300,000 literary quotes. Furthermore, it contains fixed expressions and pronunciation.The dictionary is free and edited daily.
Danish	200,000		Ordbog over det danske Sprog	Dictionary maintained by the Society for Danish Language and Literature. Covers Danish language use 1700–1950. The society also maintains a sister dictionary, Den Danske Ordbog covering language use since 1950.
Slovak	200,000		Slovník slovenského jazyka z r. 1959 – 1968, Slovník súčasného slovenského jazyka A – G, H – L, M – N z r. 2006, 2011, 2015	Here is the information about the number of words in Slovak written by Jazykovedný ústav Ľ. Štúra SAV.
Tibetan	195,919		Rangjung Yeshe Dharma Dictionary	Considering the large number of Buddhist terminology, colloquial expressions and modern literary Tibetan neologisms not included in this dictionary, the actual total number is probably about twice the number of terms included on this website (195,919), perhaps 375–400,000 Tibetan words in total.
Sanskrit	186,000		Monier-Williams Sanskrit-English Dictionary, 1899 (IITS Koelin)	The work of Monier Monier-Williams, who as a Boden Professor of Sanskrit at the University of Oxford.
Hindi	163,642		Hindi Wiktionary	Contains 163,642 Hindi gloss entries.
Kazakh	166,000		15 томдық "Қазақ тілінің түсіндірме сөздігі"	Explanatory dictionary of the Kazakh language.
German	165,700		German Wiktionary	Contains 165,700 German gloss entries.
Romanian	155,000		DLR	Dicționarul Limbii Române.
Serbian	150,000		Matica Srpska	A comprehensive six-volume dictionary of the modern Serbian literary language. It contains approximately 150,000 words and represents the most important complete dictionary of the Serbian language since the 19th-century works. A one-volume condensed version was published in 2007.
Belarusian	150,000		Слоўнік беларускай мовы	
Icelandic	150,000		Orðabók Blöndals	The dictionary contains 150,000 headwords in 17 volumes.
Russian	150,000		Большой академический словарь русского языка	Great Academy Dictionary of Russian language.
Swiss German	150,000		Schweizerisches Idiotikon	The dictionary contains 150,000 words from the late Middle Ages to today.
German	148,000		Duden – Die deutsche Rechtschreibung	The most influential dictionary in Germany, a dictionary of orthography.
Eastern Armenian	146,600		Արդի հայերենի բացատրական բառարան	Explanatory Dictionary of Modern Armenian is a four-volume dictionary of Eastern Armenian. Published in Yerevan in 1976 it remains the most comprehensive lexicographic work for modern Armenian.
Polish	140,000		Wielki słownik ortograficzny PWN	Big orthography dictionary PWN contains new words, proper nouns and latest spelling changes.
French	135,000		Trésor de la Langue Française informatisé	ATILF (Analyse et Traitement Informatique de la Langue Française – Computer Processing and Analysis of the French Language); 135,000 (Larousse Dictionnaire de français, published by Editions Larousse).
Ukrainian	134,058		Словник української мови (The Dictionary of the Ukrainian language)	The dictionary was finished in late 1970s–early 1980s.
Dutch	134,000		Woordenlijst Nederlandse Taal (Het Groene Boekje)	
Russian	130,000		Большой толковый словарь русского языка	Great Dictionary of Russian language.
Swedish	130,000		Rikstermbanken	Sweden's national term bank.
Swedish	126,000		Svenska Akademiens ordlista (SAOL)	Normative Swedish language spelling dictionary, which includes only commonly used words, currently includes ~126,000 words, after having added 13,500 and removed 9,000 in its latest edition, SAOL 14, plus an additional 200,000 still encountered words in earlier editions.
Sanskrit	125,000		Encyclopaedic Dictionary of Sanskrit on Historical Principles	Devised by Professor Sumitra Mangesh Katre at Deccan College in 1948. The dictionary is based on a collection of 1469 Sanskrit treatises covering over 3,000 years of Sanskrit, from the Vedas (1400 BCE) up to Hāsyarṇava (1850 CE). The Dictionary includes 62 branches of knowledge including the Darśana (Indian Philosophy), Vyākaraṇa, Amarakośaṃ, subject specific dictionaries, literature, science, mathematics, medicine, veterinary sciences, games, music, warfare, etc. The dictionary currently has 35 volumes and consist of 6056 pages only covering the first character of Devanagari, अ. When completed the dictionary is said to have over 2,000,000 vocables.
Tamil	124,405		University of Madras Tamil Lexicon	The dictionary includes 124,405 separate entries.
Bulgarian	124,000		Dictionary of the Bulgarian Language (monolingual academic explanatory dictionary), (Многотомен) Речник на българския език in Bulgarian, in 15+ volumes	This dictionary covers vocabulary from the last 150 years of Bulgarian and is compiled and edited by linguistics (primarily native lexicographers and lexicologists) from The Institute for the Bulgarian Language (part of the Bulgarian Academy of Sciences). It includes basic, commonly used, literary, colloquial, dialectical, archaic and obsolete Bulgarian words, as well as some specialized terminology. The latest volume (15th) published in 2015 ends with headwords beginning with the (Bulgarian Cyrillic) letter **Р**.
Malaysian	120,000		Kamus Dewan Perdana, 1st Edition, 2020	
Arabic (Note: Jalal al-Din al-Suyuti's book "Al-Mizhar fi Eulum Allughat Wa'anwaeiha" (Arabic: المزهر في علوم اللغة وأنواعها) states that in the Kitab al-'Ayn, the first Arabic dictionary, the number of attested and potential two-to-five-consonant word stems, plus the inflectional forms derived from them, was calculated at 12,305,412.)	120,000		Taj al-'Arus min Jawahir al-Qamus	The dictionary includes 120,000 entries filling 40 volumes, whereby one entry comprises dozens of words.
Albanian	120,000		Fjalor i gjuhes shqipe, 2024	70,000 words added from the previous edition of 1980
Frisian	120,000		Het Wurdboek fan de Fryske taal	Dictionary of New Frisian (Nieuwfries) from 1800 to 1975.
Finland Swedish	120,000		Ordbok över Finlands svenska folkmål (in progress)	The dictionary includes around 120,000 headwords.
French	116,000		Le Dictionnaire universel francophone (DUF)	Dictionary published by Hachette.
Georgian	112,949		ქართული ენის განმარტებითი ლექსიკონი (Explanatory dictionary of the Georgian language)	The electronic version of this Dictionary, consisting of 129755 records, is the joint project of Arnold Chikobava Institute of Linguistics and Language Modeling Association. The project was financed by Rustaveli Foundation.
Belarusian	112,462		Skarnik	As of August 2019. Belarusian-Russian online dictionary contains 112,462 words.
Slovene	110,180		Slovar slovenskega knjižnega jezika, Second edition, 2014	The official dictionary of modern Slovene is Slovar slovenskega knjižnega jezika (SSKJ; Standard Slovene Dictionary). It was published in five volumes by Državna Založba Slovenije between 1970 and 1991 and contains more than 100,000 entries and subentries with accentuation, part-of-speech labels, common collocations, and various qualifiers. In the 1990s, an electronic version of the dictionary was published and it is available online.
Finnish	102,174		Kielitoimiston sanakirja, 2018	Online dictionary. Institute for the Languages of Finland (governmental institute) has selected the core vocabulary, and many headwords are not included.
Kajkavian	100,000		Rječnici HAZU	A historical and descriptive dictionary covering the Kajkavian literary language from the 16th to the mid-19th century. Currently consists of 14 published volumes, with an estimated total of over 100,000 headwords upon completion. It is a vital source for historical dialectology and South Slavic linguistics.
Afrikaans	100,000		Handwoordeboek van die Afrikaanse Taal (**HAT**), 2015	New 6th edition contains 3228 new keywords and 5365 meaning.
French	100,000		Le Grand Robert, 2019	Contains 100,000 words and 350,000 definitions.
Austrian German	100,000		Österreichisches Wörterbuch, 2018	Official dictionary of the German language in the Republic of Austria.
Polish	100,000		Słownik języka polskiego PWN	Polish dictionary of PWN contains about 100,000 articles and 145,000 definitions.
Russian	100,000		Орфографический словарь русского языка	Normative Russian dictionary, the dictionary includes around 100,000 words.
Turkish	98,738		Güncel Türkçe Sözlük	Online dictionary of the Turkish Language Association Contains 64,994 words, 33,744 idioms and proverbs and 132,548 meanings.
Turkish	93,000		Misalli Büyük Türkçe Sözlük (Kubbealtı Lugatı)	Turkish dictionary that is composed of modern and Ottoman Turkish, includes 60,000 entries and 33,000 idioms with around 100,000 examples based on literary works of 840 writers. It's online version is named "Kubbealtı Lugatı".
Spanish	93,000		Diccionario de la lengua española de la Real Academia Española, 23rd edition, 2014	
Central Kurdish	93,000		فەرهەنگی زانستگای کوردستان University of Kurdistan Dictionary: Kurdish-Persian, Rohani, M. (2018)	The four volumes of the Kurdish-to-Persian and Persian-to-Kurdish dictionary have 93,000 vocabulary terms. Director Majid Rouhani worked for ten years to complete it.
Spanish	90,000		Diccionario de uso del español, 2007	Contains 90,000 keywords and 190,000 meaning.
Dutch	90,000		Van Dale, 14th edition, 2005	
Catalan	88,500	172,000	Gran Diccionari de la llengua catalana (Great Dictionary of the Catalan language, includes the definitions in the Diccionari de la llengua catalana)	Contains 88,500 headwords and 172,000 definitions.
Chinese	85,568		Zhonghua Zihai	The largest character dictionary covering all varieties of Chinese, a compilation of Chinese characters in use over three millennia of written history.
Serbian	85,000		Matica Srpska	A modern, single-volume descriptive dictionary of the Serbian language published in 2007. It contains approximately 85,000 words, including updated terminology and contemporary usage not found in the earlier six-volume edition.
Arabic	83,015		المعجم المعاصر2019	The first version (2019) contains approximately 83,015 entries.
Scots	80,259		Dictionaries of the Scots Language	An online dictionary comprising A Dictionary of the Older Scottish Tongue (covering the period up to 1700) and The Scottish National Dictionary (from 1700).
Hebrew	80,000		The Academy of the Hebrew Language	Notes for word count can be found on The Academy of the Hebrew Language website
Arabic	80,000		Lisan Al-Arab	The dictionary includes around 80,000 entries.
French	80,000		Dictionnaire de la langue française	Four-volume dictionary of the French language by Émile Littré.
Uzbek	80,000		Oʻzbek tilining izohli lugʻati (Annotated Dictionary of the Uzbek Language)	The largest Uzbek language dictionary, made of five volumes and including around 80,000 entries.
Middle Dutch	75,000		Het Middelnederlandsch Woordenboek	Historical dictionary of Middle Dutch: 1250–1550.
Romanian	67,000		Dicționarul explicativ al limbii române (Published by the Romanian Academy)	
Tamazight	65,716		Amawal Ameqran (The Great Dictionary), by Abdelhafed Idres, published in 2017	Presented by l'Entreprise Nationale des Arts Graphiques (enag.dz), the dictionary includes around 65,716 entries
Swedish	65,000		Svensk ordbok utgiven av Svenska Akademien (Svensk ordbok, SO)	The dictionary includes around 65,000 headwords.
Punjabi	64,263		Mahan Kosh	First published in 1930, the dictionary includes 64,263 entries in Gurmukhi script. It has been republished many times.
Swedish	64,000		Ordbok öfver svenska språket (Dalin Ordbok)	The dictionary includes around 64,000 headwords.
Malayalam	60,460		ശബ്ദതാരാവലി - ശ്രീകണ്ഠേശ്വരം പത്മനാഭപിള്ള	60,460 entries
Arabic	60,000		Al-Qamus al-Muhit wa al-Qabus al-Wasit (Note: Al-Qamus al-Muhit means 'The surrounding Ocean'.)	The dictionary includes around 60,000 entries.
Dutch	60,000		Groot Woordenboek Afrikaans en Nederlands	Dutch-Afrikaans dictionary.
Turkish	60,000		Osmanlıca-Türkçe Ansiklopedik Lûgat	Ottoman Turkish dictionary, includes 60,000 entries.
Galician	59,999		Dicionario da Real Academia Galega (Dictionary of the Royal Galician Academy)	
Western Armenian	56,000		Հայոց լեզուի նոր բառարան	Hayoc' lezowi nor baṙaran.
Tatar	56,000		Татарско-русский словарь Ш.Н. Асылгараева, Ф.А. Ганиева, М.З. Закиева, К.М. Миннуллина, Д.Б. Рамазанова	Tatar-Russian dictionary of Sh.N. Asylgaraev, F.A. Ganiev, M.Z. Zakiyev, K.M. Minnullin, D.B. Ramazanova.
French	55,000		Dictionnaire de l'Académie française (DAF)	Normative French dictionary, once complete, it will contain 55,000 words.
Dutch	52,000		Woordenlijst Nederlandse Taal	Normative Dutch dictionary, the dictionary includes around 52,000 entries and around 134.000 derivative words.
Dutch	50,000		Het Groene woordenboek - Handwoordenboek Nederlands	
Turkmen	50,000		Türkmen diliniň düşündirişli sözlügi	Turkmen Explanatory Dictionary.
Lakota (Lakȟóta)	44,000		New Lakota Dictionary	A bilingual Lakota-English and English-Lakota dictionary, book format (editions: 2008, 2011, 2022), mobile app version (2014), desktop version (2015).
Azerbaijani	44,750		Azərbaycan dilinin izahlı lüğəti	Azerbaijani Explanatory Dictionary.
Syriac	43,030		Sureth dictionary	Published by the Association Assyrophile de France, it features Assyrian Neo-Aramaic, Turoyo and Chaldean Neo-Aramaic words of all dialects.
Icelandic	43,000	560,000	Orðabók Háskólans	43,000 basic words and 519,000 compound words of which more than half are attested only once or don't get into print ("instant combinations").
Thai	40,840		พจนานุกรม ฉบับราชบัณฑิตยสถาน พ.ศ. ๒๕๕๔	
Bashkir	40,000		Башкирско-русский словарь Ураксин З.Г.	Bashkir-Russian dictionary Uraksin Z. G.
Chuvash	40,000		Чувашско-русский словарь Скворцова М. И.	Chuvash-Russian dictionary Skvortsova M. I.
Dargwa	40,000		Даргинско-русский словарь Юсупова Х. А.	Dargwa-Russian dictionary of Yusupov H. A.
Norwegian (Riksmål)	40,000		Riksmålsordlisten	Normative dictionary of the non-official Norwegian written language called Riksmål.
Arabic	40,000		Taj al-Lugha wa Sihah al-Arabiyya (Note: The name means 'The crown of Language and the authentic of Arabic'.)	The dictionary includes around 40,000 entries.
Classical Latin	39,589		Oxford Latin Dictionary	Includes 39,589 Classical Latin entries, including borrowings from Greek, Gaulish, other Italic dialects, Sanskrit, and others. There are about: 10,000 adjectives, 2,123 adverbs, 46 conjunctions, 77 interjections, 17,450 nouns, 26 particles, 39 prepositions, 17 pronouns, and 5,986 verbs. The remaining entries are references to other entries (such as alternate spellings or archaic versions), prefixes, suffixes, and terms left untranslated by the original editors.
Avar	36,000		Аварско-русский словарь Гимбатова. М. М.	Avar-Russian dictionary of M. M. Gimbatov.
Venetian	36,000		Dizionario della lingua veneta	Dictionary of Venetian Language of Gianfranco Cavallin.
Komi	32,659		Большой коми-русский словарь	A reverse Russian-Komi dictionary contains 50722 words.
Lezgi	28,000		Лезгинско-русский словарь: Б. Б Талибов, М. М. Гаджиев	Lezgi-Russian dictionary: B. B Talibov, M. M. Gadzhiev.
Middle Dutch	25,000		Het Vroegmiddelnederlands Woordenboek	Historical dictionary of Middle Dutch: 1200–1300.
Old Swedish	22,894		Ordbok öfver svenska medeltidsspråket	The dictionary includes around 22,894 headwords in 3 volumes, and with the 2 volume supplement (21,495 headwords) the dictionary includes 44,389 headwords.
Chechen	20,000		Чеченско-русский словарь. Алироев, И.А.; Хамидова, З.Х.; Алексеев, М.Е.	Chechen-Russian dictionary. I.A Aliroev., Z.Kh. Khamidova., M.E. Alekseev.
Kabardian	20,000		Кабардинско-русский словарь. М. Л. Апажев, Н. А. Багов	Kabardian-Russian dictionary. M. L. Apazhev, N. A. Bagov.
Quechua	20,000		Diccionario Quechua-Español Lira Jorge	Quechua-Spanish dictionary Lira Jorge.
Esperanto	16,780		Plena Ilustrita Vortaro de Esperanto (Complete Illustrated Dictionary of Esperanto)	46,890 lexical units.
Malayalam	16,000		Chathur Dravida Bhasha Nighandu (Dictionary of Four Dravidian Languages)	Malayalam, Kannada , Tamil and Telugu multilingual dictionary published by Kerala Bhasha Institute and authored by Njattyela Sreedharan. The dictionary includes around 16,000 headwords.
Ingush	11,142		Ингушско-русский словарь. М. С. Мургустов.	Ingush-Russian dictionary by M.S. Murgustov.
Nahuatl	10,500		Tlahtolxitlauhcayotl: Chicontepec, Veracruz	Huasteca Nahuatl monolingual dictionary with 10,500 entries of which 360 are loanwords, co-authored by John Joseph Sullivan.
Old Dutch	9,000		Het Oudnederlands Woordenboek	
Flemish-only words	1,000		Het Gele Boekje	
Toki Pona	181		RobWords	A later dictionary added 17 words, bringing the total number of official words to 137. Subsequently, the Lipu Linku dictionary has used the Toki Pona language survey to identify 260 words in use in Toki Pona, though not all are frequently used.

== See also ==
- Comparison of English dictionaries
