= Tibb's Eve =

Regional holiday in western Newfoundland

- Observed by: Newfoundlanders
- Type: Cultural
- Significance: Beginning of the Christmas season
- Observances: Drinking and merriment
- Date: 23 December
- Next time: 23 December 2026
- Frequency: Annual
- Related to: Christmas Eve, Christmas Day, Advent

Tibb's Eve is a folk expression for a day which will never arrive. A celebration held on 23 December in Newfoundland and Labrador is also known as Tibb's/Tipp's Eve.

== Origin of the phrase ==
Saint Tibb (or Tib) is a character appearing in 17th-century English plays. The character is a loose-moraled woman and was used for comic relief. The word was also used to describe a "wanton" as in epigrammist Richard Turner's "Nosce Te (Humours)" written in 1607:

They wondred much at Tom, but at Tibb more,
Faith (quoth the vicker) 'tis an exlent whore.

Folklorist Philip Hiscock notes:

In jokes and plays four centuries ago, Tib often referred to a girl with loose morals, so there was no Saint Tib and therefore no Tib's Eve. To say something would happen on Tib's Eve was to say it would never happen.

Tibb's Eve was a "non-time"; if something was said to happen on Tibb's Eve, it was unlikely it would ever happen. It appears circa 1785 in "A classical dictionary of the vulgar tongue" thusly: "Saint Tibb's Evening, the evening of the last day, or day of Judgement; he will pay you on St. Tibb's Eve, (Irish)." This usage, seen in English newspapers in the 1830s and American newspapers of the 1840s, is illustrated in this 1902 editorial:

The other day I was conversing with a man about a prospective event. "Yes," said he, "it will be on Tib’s Eve, neither before nor after Christmas", expressing thus his incredulity as to the function ever coming off.

Similar phrases exist, such as 30 February, "the twelfth of never", and "when two Mondays fall together"; however, Tibb's Eve has become associated with the Christmas season.

There are several records of this phrase in use in the Ulster dialect of Northern Ireland. In 1903 it was recorded with unknown origins and meaning "a day that would never come". In 1904, the phrase was included on a list of words in the Ulster dialect used in the Midland and Northwestern Counties as "a festival not to be found in the Calendar. Used as an evasion, as it is said to occur neither before nor after Christmas."

The expression "Saint Tibb's Eve" is recorded in Cornwall, also meaning "a day which never comes".

There is one saint whose name is familiar to all in Cornwall, but whose sex is unknown. This saint has much to answer for; promises made, but never intended to be kept, are all to be fulfilled on next St. Tibb's eve, a day that some folks say "falls between the old and new year"; others describe it as one that comes "neither before nor after Christmas".

The phrase traveled to Newfoundland and Labrador. George Story describes Tibb's Eve as "generally 'neither before nor after Christmas', i.e. never" as an Anglo-Irish term in Newfoundland English dialect. Writing in a St. John's newspaper in 1921, then acting mayor JJ Mullaly used the phrase in this way, noting, "...you and the Mayor might be writing till Tibb's Eve without result." This use continued in the province at least into the 1970s:

Tibb's Eve was traditionally used in Newfoundland vernacular as a unspecified date that didn't exist. If you asked someone when they were going to pay you back the money they owed you they might answer "On Tibb's Eve" meaning that you probably won't see that money again.

== As a holiday ==
Tibb's Eve is a long standing holiday in Newfoundland and Labrador.

Eventually, proverbial explanations arose as to when this non-existent Tibbs Eve was: "Neither before nor after Christmas" was one. "Between the old year and the new" was another. Thus, the day became associated with the Christmas season.

Sometime around World War II, people along the south coast of Newfoundland began to associate 23 December with the phrase 'Tibb's Eve' and deemed it the first night during Advent when it was appropriate to have a drink. Advent was a sober, religious time of year and traditionally people would not drink alcohol until Christmas Day at the earliest. Tibb's Eve emerged as an excuse to imbibe two days earlier.

For some people, Tibb's Eve is the beginning of the Christmas season. Observed on December 23rd and sometimes called Tip's Eve or Tipsy Eve, it's one of several extensions of the holidays. For many Newfoundlanders, this day is the official opening of Christmas, the first chance to drink the Christmas stash. The date of Tibb's Eve is only known in Newfoundland.

The tradition of celebrating Tibb's Eve may be similar to 19th century workers taking Saint Monday off from work.

== Evolution and commercialization ==
An outport tradition not originally celebrated in St. John's, Tibb's Eve was adopted circa 2010 by local bar owners, who saw it as a business opportunity. Brewery taproom owners have suggested that hosting Tibb's Eve events allow them to open up "Newfoundland experiences to outsiders."

The informal holiday has been also used for fundraising efforts, including the "Shine Your Light on Tibb’s Eve" fundraiser for the St. John's Women's Centre, first organized circa 2009 in St. John's, and Tibb's Eve charity drives organized by the Masons in Grand Bank, NL.

Since then, social media and expatriate Newfoundlanders have spread the tradition to other parts of Canada, such as Halifax, Nova Scotia and Toronto, Ontario. In 2014, Grande Prairie Golf and Country Club in Alberta hosted a Newfoundland-themed Tibb's Eve event, in support of local charities. In 2016, Folly Brewpub in Toronto brewed its own "Tibb's Eve" spiced ale. In 2019, comedian Colin Hollett described the holiday this way for a Halifax newspaper:

Tibb's Eve on December 23, when people drink and eat at kitchen parties and bars with all the people they want to celebrate with before spending time with those they have to. I have no idea how that isn't huge everywhere else.

The concept of the day being the "official" start of the Christmas holiday season was promoted in local media by 2020. In 2021, several Newfoundland bars hosted Tibb's Eve ugly Christmas sweater events, while Port Rexton Brewery produced a "Tibbs the Saison" beer.

== Pseudo-etymology ==
Tibb's Eve is sometimes referred to as Tipp's Eve, Tip's Eve, or Tipsy Eve. A popular contemporary legend or folk etymology maintains that these names are attributed to the word tipple, which is a verb meaning to drink intoxicating liquor, especially habitually or to some excess. For example:

The more contemporary explanation of St. Tibb's comes from the association of the day with a Christmas tipple. In the 1500s, if you were to go out for a drink, you went to a "tipple" or alehouse and were served by a "tippler" – the alehouse keeper. In Newfoundland, St. Tibb's became the first real occasion to taste the home brew, a day where the men would visit each other's homes for a taste.

This use is reinforced with examples from the Dictionary of Newfoundland English. Christopher Perry of Daniel's Harbour, Newfoundland and Labrador says:

I've always assumed that the name Tipsey Eve originated from this custom of the men going from house to house on the afternoon of December 23rd to test or taste each other's brew. Whether it did or not, when they returned home in the late evening or at night they were usually quite tipsey...

Edie Smith from Port-aux-Basques, Newfoundland and Labrador, explains where she believes the name comes from:

Christmas really starts in my home on Tipps Eve, which is the day before Christmas. I have heard that it is called Tipps Eve because when men used to put up their own homebrew etc. they wouldn't drink it before Christmas, but I guess most men would sneak a drink or two on this day because they felt the Christmas was close and they probably got a bit tipsy – thus Tipps Eve.

From the use of Tibb's Eve as meaning neither before nor after Christmas; through folk etymology and pronunciation shift, the phrase became linked with the concept of tipsy or tipple. As William Kirwin says:

Folk etymology, strictly speaking, should be a re-formation of a strangely pronounced or spelled form with the result that the new term makes plausible sense. A second stage in the process may be an expressed justification or explanation of the new term, when it is first used or by other commentators at a later time.

Hiscock notes:

For someone who thinks of it as a day to get tipsy, then Tipsy Eve is perfect. There's nothing wrong with that. That's a good way of calling it. And, of course, it's all based in the kind of humour that people have had for hundreds of years. So, there's no reason why people should not make humorous adjustments to it in the present.
