= ONW =

ONW may refer to:

- Operation Northern Watch, military operation in Iraq following the first Gulf War
- Olathe Northwest High School, Olathe, Kansas
- The ISO 639-3 code for the Old Nubian language
- Oudnederlands Woordenboek, dictionary of the Old Dutch language - see List of dictionaries by number of words
