= Pattern grammar =

Pattern Grammar is a model for describing the syntactic environments of individual lexical items, derived from studying their occurrences in authentic linguistic corpora. It was developed by Hunston, Francis, and Manning as part of the COBUILD project. It is a highly informal account that suggests a linear view of grammar (as opposed to phrase-structure or dependency grammars).

Each word has a set of patterns assigned to it which describe typical contexts in which they are used. Often these are separate for different word senses.

== Pattern Notation ==
Patterns are given as sequence of lower-case grammatical elements, with the central element of the pattern in upper case. The elements are either labels for grammatical categories ('v' for verb, 'n' for noun group, 'prep' for preposition) or actual lexical items (for example specific prepositions).

== Examples: SKIM ==
The word skim includes the following patterns in the COBUILD dictionary:

=== V n off/from n ===
Skim is a verb, and as the pattern describes its behaviour it is in upper case. The verb is then followed by a noun group, a preposition (either off or from) and a second noun group. This pattern applies for example to "She skimmed the cream off the milk". The choice of preposition is limited to those two options, which is why they are specified directly instead of using the broader category 'prep'.

=== V n ===
This pattern describes the use of skim in "...re-surface all the walls by skimming the surface smooth ready for painting..."

=== V over/across n ===
"I was wondering if someone who speaks French could skim over it for me and correct it."

=== V through n ===
"You can skim through our step-by-step guide and find out why"
