= Robert Hartwell Fiske =

Robert Hartwell Fiske (March 5, 1948 – April 25, 2016) was a writer, editor, and publisher of The Vocabula Review, an online journal about the English language, from 1999 until his death in 2016. He wrote several books about grammar and usage, including To the Point: A Dictionary of Concise Writing (Norton, 2014), The Dictionary of Unendurable English (Scribner, 2011), The Dimwit's Dictionary (Marion Street Press, 2011), and Elegant English (Vocabula Communications Company, 2014).

The purpose of Fiske's site Vocabula, according to Fiske, was to encourage clear English and to discourage careless English. Among the schools which had bought licenses to the site were Columbia University, Princeton University, and Stanford University.

After Fiske's death of melanoma in 2016 at the age of 68, essayist Joseph Epstein said that Fiske was "an unknown soldier in that most glorious and hopeless of wars, that against the ignorant and abusive use of language." He stated that Fiske's linguistic prescriptivism was not well-received by contemporary linguists.

Reviewing Vocabula Bound, a collection of essays and poems culled from The Vocabula Review, linguist Alan Kaye said it is "far too prescriptivist in orientation for a sophisticated linguistic audience". In the Canadian newspaper the National Post, a book reviewer said Fiske's Dictionary of Unendurable English would be enjoyed by "word snobs and copy editors" and would benefit those learning English. A book reviewer in the Canadian newspaper The Globe and Mail said that it is "so passionate in the prescriptivist cause of smiting the lax and the uncaring that the book at times resembles a parody of itself".
