= Fascist education =

Systems and culture of education under fascist governments

Fascist education, also sometimes known as Fascist pedagogy was developed during the era of Fascist regimes such as Mussolini's Italy (1922–1943), aimed to mold young minds to be loyal and obedient to the state and its ideologies. This system focused on creating a generation of citizens who would uphold and propagate the principles of Fascism.

== Overview ==
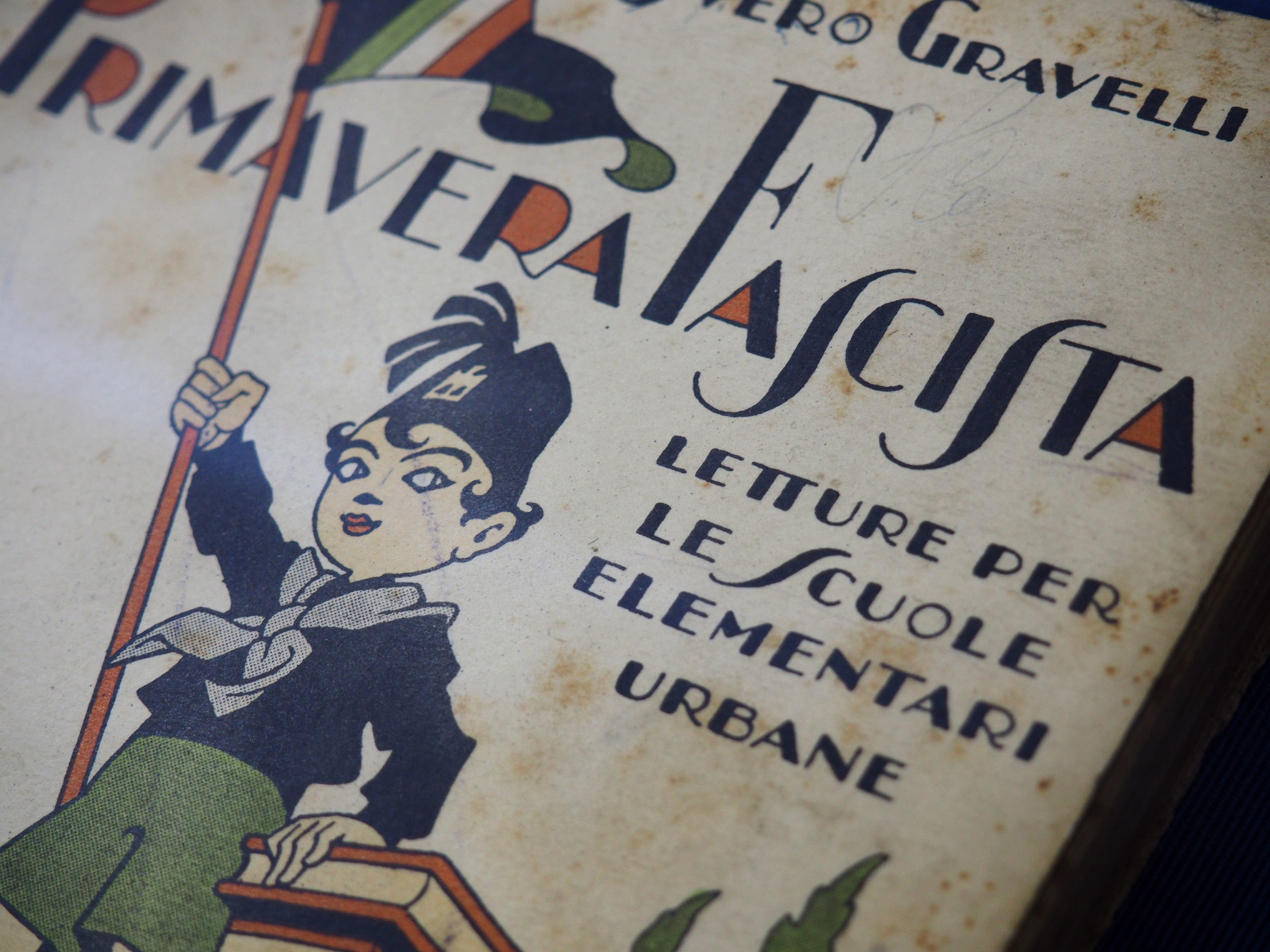
Cover of the school book "Primavera fascista. Letture per le scuole elementari urbane" of the fascist figure Asvero Gravelli, published by A. Mondadori, Italy, 1929.

Fascist education permeated all aspects of youth life, including extracurricular activities, youth organizations, and family dynamics. The overarching goal was to create a generation of individuals who were unwaveringly loyal to the Fascist state, willing to defend its principles, and propagate its ideologies throughout their lives.

The main and best-known representative of fascist education is Giovanni Gentile. As Minister of Education, Gentile implemented sweeping reforms to the Italian education system, known as the Gentile Reform.

Fascist states pursued policies of social indoctrination through propaganda in education and the media, and regulation of the production of educational and media materials. Education was designed to glorify the fascist movement and inform students of its historical and political importance to the nation. It attempted to purge ideas that were not consistent with the beliefs of the fascist movement and to teach students to be obedient to the state. Filippo Tommaso Marinetti promoted the need of physical training of young men saying that, in male education, gymnastics should take precedence over books. He advocated segregation of the genders because womanly sensibility must not enter men's education, which he claimed must be "lively, bellicose, muscular and violently dynamic."

== Basic aspects ==
The basic aspects of Fascist education were:

Ideological Indoctrination

Curriculum and educational materials were heavily infused with Fascist propaganda. History, literature, and even science subjects were taught in ways that supported the regime's doctrines and glorified its leaders.

Cult of Personality

Central figures like Benito Mussolini were portrayed as heroic saviors of the nation. Their images and stories of their supposed greatness were omnipresent in classrooms and educational resources.

Emphasis on Physical Education and Military Training

Physical education and military training were critical components of the curriculum. The regime believed that a strong, healthy, and disciplined body was essential for the nation's strength. Activities such as sports, gymnastics, and military drills were commonplace.

Nationalism and Militarism

Education fostered an intense sense of nationalism and readiness for military service. Youth organizations like Italy's Opera Nazionale Balilla and Germany's Hitler Youth were instrumental in instilling these values and preparing young people for future roles as soldiers and loyal citizens.

Gender-Specific Roles

Boys and girls were educated with distinct roles in mind. Boys were trained to be warriors and leaders, while girls were prepared for motherhood and domestic duties, emphasizing their roles in supporting the family and the state.

Suppression of Dissent and Critical Thinking

Critical thinking and dissent were discouraged. The educational system promoted conformity and obedience to the state. Ideas that contradicted Fascist ideology, such as liberalism, communism, and democracy, were vilified.

Racial and Cultural Superiority

Particularly in Nazi Germany, education was used to promote notions of racial purity and superiority. Textbooks and lessons often included racist ideologies, teaching children to believe in the supremacy of the Aryan race and to despise those deemed inferior.

Anti-Communism and Anti-Liberalism

Communist and liberal ideas were portrayed as dangerous and destructive. The education system aimed to create a deep-seated aversion to these ideologies among the youth.

== See also ==
- Ur-Fascism
- Anti-fascist education
