= Orin Hargraves =

American lexicographer and writer (born 1953)

Orin Hargraves (born 1953) is an American lexicographer and writer. His language reference works include Mighty Fine Words and Smashing Expressions: Making Sense of Transatlantic English (Oxford University Press, 2002), Slang Rules!: A Practical Guide for English Learners (Merriam-Webster, 2008), and (with Willard Espy) Words to Rhyme With: A Rhyming Dictionary (2nd edition; Facts on File, 2006). In addition he has contributed definitions and other material to dictionaries and other language reference works issued by Oxford University Press, Cambridge University Press, Longman, Macmillan, HarperCollins, Chambers Harrap, Langenscheidt, Berlitz, Scholastic Corporation, and Merriam-Webster, among others.

== Biography ==
Orin Knight Hargraves was born on September 14, 1953, in Denver, Colorado. He spent most of his childhood in Creede, Colorado, and graduated with honors from the University of Chicago in 1977, concentrating in philosophy, language and literature. He served in the U.S. Peace Corps in Morocco where he taught English in a government lycée. Later he worked in the publishing software industry in Chicago and London. He began his career in lexicography in 1991 in London. He joined the Dictionary Society of North America in 1993 and was elected its vice president/president elect in 2009. He lives in Niwot, Colorado.

== Bibliography ==
=== As author or editor ===
- —— (2015). It's Been Said Before.
- —— (2008). Slang Rules!: A Practical Guide for English Learners. Springfield, MA: Merriam-Webster. ISBN 978-0-87779-682-4.
- —— (2007). The Big Book of Spelling Tests. New York: Black Dog & Leventhal Publishers. ISBN 978-1-57912-696-4.
- —— (2006–2008) Spell It! study guide for the Scripps National Spelling Bee
- Espy, Willard; —— (2006). Words to Rhyme With: A Rhyming Dictionary. Facts On File. ISBN 978-0-8160-6304-8.
- ——, ed. (2004). New Words. Oxford: Oxford University Press. ISBN 978-0-19-517282-9.
- —— (October 2004). "Cucurbits". English Today. 20 (4): 50–54. doi:10.1017/S0266078404004092.
- —— (2004). "Long Distance Lexicography: a View from the Field". Dictionaries: Journal of the Dictionary Society of North America. 25: 137–147. doi:10.1353/dic.2004.0000. S2CID 145399102.
- —— (June 2003). "Who Owns English?". The Vocabula Review. Archived from the original on 2010-11-09.
- —— (2002). Mighty Fine Words and Smashing Expressions: Making Sense of Transatlantic English. Oxford University Press. ISBN 978-0-19-515704-8.

=== As contributor ===
- Scholastic Children's Dictionary. New York: Scholastic. 2010. ISBN 978-0-545-21858-0.
- Cambridge Academic Content Dictionary. Cambridge University Press. 2009. ISBN 978-0-521-87143-3.
- Merriam-Webster's Advanced Learner's English Dictionary. Merriam-Webster. 2008. ISBN 978-0-87779-551-3.
- Cambridge Dictionary of American English. Cambridge University Press. 2008. ISBN 978-0-521-69198-7.
- Soanes, Catherine; Stevenson, Angus (2008). Concise Oxford English Dictionary. Oxford University Press. ISBN 978-0-19-954841-5.
- CollinsCobuild Advanced Dictionary of American English. Thomson Learng. 2007. ISBN 978-1-4240-0363-1.
- O'Sullivan, Jill Korey (2007). Heinle Picture Dictionary for Children (British English). Thomson Heinle. ISBN 978-1-4240-0849-0.
- Dent, Susie (200). The Language Report 5: English on the move, 2003–2007. Oxford University Press. ISBN 0-19-923388-8.
- Rickerson, E. M.; Hilton, Barry (2006). The 5-Minute Linguist: Bite Sized Essays on Language and Languages. Equinox Pub. ISBN 978-1-84553-199-7.
- Berlitz English Pronunciation Program CD. 2005. ISBN 981-246-709-2.
- Harrap's Spanish and English Dictionary. 2005. ISBN 0-07-144072-0.
- Oxford Dictionary of English. 2005. ISBN 0-19-861057-2.
- Collins-Cobuild English Usage. 2004. ISBN 0-00-716346-0.
- Microsoft; Jellis, Susan (2004). Microsoft Encarta Thesaurus. Macmillan. ISBN 0-312-98363-8.
- McKean, Erin (2004). New Oxford American Dictionary. Oxford University Press, USA. ISBN 0-19-517077-6.
- Cambridge Dictionary of American Idioms. 2003. ISBN 0-521-53271-X.
- Langenscheidt's Großwörterbuch Muret-Sanders Deutsch-Englisch (in German and English). 2003. ISBN 3-468-02126-7.
- Macmillan English Dictionary for Advanced Learners. Palgrave Macmillan UK. 2002. ISBN 0-333-96670-8.
- Oxford Essential Dictionary of the US Military. Berkley Books. 2001. ISBN 0-425-18069-7.
- Merriam-Webster Collegiate Encyclopedia. Merriam-Webster. 2000. ISBN 0-87779-017-5.
- Soukhanov, Anne H. (1999). Encarta World English Dictionary. St. Martin's Press. ISBN 0-312-22222-X.
- Longman Interactive American Dictionary CD-ROM. Longman. 1997. ISBN 0-582-24795-0.
- Summers, Della (1992). Longman Dictionary of English Language and Culture. Longman. ISBN 0-582-23720-3.

=== Other writing ===
- —— (2006). Culture Shock! London: A Survival Guide to Customs and Etiquette. Tarrytown, NY: Marshall Cavendish Editions. ISBN 978-0-7614-2500-7.
- —— (2007). Culture Shock! Morocco: A Survival Guide to Customs and Etiquette. Tarrytown, NY: Marshall Cavendish Editions. ISBN 978-0-7614-2502-1.
- —— (2007). Culture Shock!: Chicago at Your Door. Tarrytown, NY: Marshall Cavendish Editions. ISBN 978-0-7614-5400-7.
