= List of Canadian English dictionaries =

List of Canadian English dictionaries:

- Canadian Oxford Dictionary ISBN 0195418166
- Collins Canadian Dictionary ISBN 0007337523
- A Dictionary of Canadianisms on Historical Principles ISBN 0771519761
- Gage Canadian Dictionary ISBN 0771519818
- Houghton Mifflin Canadian Dictionary ISBN 0395296544
- ITP Nelson Canadian Dictionary ISBN 0176065911
- Penguin Canadian Dictionary ISBN 0773050078
- Reader's Digest Webster's Canadian Dictionary and Thesaurus ISBN 1554750520
- Webster's Canadian Dictionary ISBN 1596951311
- Winston Canadian Dictionary ISBN 0176425691

== Variants ==
- Dictionary of Prince Edward Island English ISBN 0802057810
- Dictionary of Newfoundland English ISBN 0802068197
- Dictionary of Newfoundland & Labrador ISBN 1895109345
- Dictionary of Cape Breton English ISBN 978-1442615991

== See also ==
- Bibliography of Canada#Canadian style guides
