= Ur-Fascism =

1995 essay by Umberto Eco

Eternal Fascism: Fourteen Ways of Looking at a Blackshirt
- Author: Umberto Eco
- Original title: Il fascismo eterno Ur-Fascismo
- Language: Italian
- Subject: Fascism
- Publication date: 1995
- Publication place: Italy

"Ur-Fascism" or "Eternal Fascism: Fourteen Ways of Looking at a Blackshirt" (Italian: Il fascismo eterno, or Ur-Fascismo) is an essay authored by the Italian philosopher, novelist, and semiotician Umberto Eco. First published in 1995, the essay provides an analysis of fascism, a definition of fascism, and discusses the fundamental characteristics and traits of fascism. Drawing on Eco's personal experiences growing up under Mussolini's Italian fascism and his extensive research on fascist movements, the essay offers his insights into what he considers to be the nature of fascism and its manifestations.

In the decades since its publication, the framework of Ur-Fascism proved influential, being frequently cited in academic literature and public discourse.

== Overview ==
Eternal Fascism: Fourteen Ways of Looking at a Blackshirt examines the core characteristics of fascism. Eco outlines fourteen key elements or traits, which he refers to as "ways", that commonly appear in fascist movements. While not all these traits are present in every fascist movement, together they create a recognizable pattern. The essay is structured around these fourteen ways, providing an in-depth exploration of fascism as a multifaceted and adaptable ideology. He argues that it is not possible to organise these into a coherent system, but that "it is enough that one of them be present to allow fascism to coagulate around it". He uses the term "ur-fascism" as a generic description of different historical forms of fascism. The fourteen properties are as follows:

1. "The cult of tradition", characterized by cultural syncretism, even at the risk of internal contradiction. When all truth has already been revealed by tradition, no new learning can occur, only further interpretation and refinement.
2. "The rejection of modernism", which views the rationalistic development of Western culture since the Enlightenment as a descent into depravity. Eco distinguishes this from a rejection of superficial technological advancement, as many fascist regimes cite their industrial potency as proof of the vitality of their system.
3. "The cult of action for action's sake", which dictates that action is of value in itself and should be taken without intellectual reflection. This, says Eco, is connected with anti-intellectualism and irrationalism, and often manifests in attacks on modern culture and science.
4. "Disagreement is treason" – fascism devalues intellectual discourse and critical reasoning as barriers to action, as well as out of fear that such analysis will expose the contradictions embodied in a syncretistic faith.
5. "Fear of difference", which fascism seeks to exploit and exacerbate, often in the form of racism or an appeal against foreigners and immigrants.
6. "Appeal to a frustrated middle class", fearing economic pressure from the demands and aspirations of lower social groups.
7. "Obsession with a plot" and the inflation of and focus on an enemy threat. This often combines an appeal to xenophobia with a fear of disloyalty and sabotage from marginalized groups living within the society. Eco also cites Pat Robertson's book The New World Order as a prominent example of a plot obsession.
8. Fascist societies rhetorically cast their enemies as "at the same time too strong and too weak", On the one hand, fascists play up the power of certain disfavored elites to encourage in their followers a sense of grievance and humiliation. On the other hand, fascist leaders point to the decadence of those elites as proof of their ultimate feebleness in the face of an overwhelming popular will.
9. "Pacifism is trafficking with the enemy" because "life is permanent warfare" – there must always be an enemy to fight. Both Nazi Germany under Hitler and fascist Italy under Mussolini, worked first to organize and clean up their respective countries and then build the war machines that they later intended to and did use – despite Germany being under restrictions of the Versailles treaty not to build a military force. This principle leads to a fundamental contradiction within fascism: the incompatibility of ultimate triumph with perpetual war.
10. "Contempt for the weak", which is uncomfortably married to a chauvinistic popular elitism, in which every member of society is superior to outsiders by virtue of belonging to the in-group. Eco sees in these attitudes the root of a deep tension in the fundamentally hierarchical structure of fascist polities, as they encourage leaders to despise their underlings, up to the ultimate leader, who holds the whole country in contempt for having allowed him to overtake it by force.
11. "Everybody is educated to become a hero", which leads to the embrace of a cult of death. As Eco observes, "the Ur-Fascist hero is impatient to die. In his impatience, he more frequently sends other people to death".
12. "Machismo", which sublimates the difficult work of permanent war and heroism into the sexual sphere. Fascists thus hold "both disdain for women and intolerance and condemnation of nonstandard sexual habits, from chastity to homosexuality".
13. "Selective populism" – the people, conceived monolithically, have a common will, distinct from and superior to the viewpoint of any individual. As no mass of people can ever be truly unanimous, the leader holds himself out as the interpreter of the popular will (though truly he alone dictates it). Fascists use this concept to delegitimize democratic institutions they accuse of "no longer represent[ing] the voice of the people".
14. "Newspeak" – fascism employs and promotes an impoverished vocabulary in order to limit critical reasoning.

== Composition and publication ==
Eco composed the text for a speech at a conference at Columbia University on April 25th 1995 under the rubric "Eternal Fascism". The text was published in English in the New York Review of Books June 22nd the same year, with the title "Ur-Fascism", and in Italian the same year, with the title "Totalitarismo fuzzy o Ur-Fascismo" (Fuzzy totalitarianism or Ur-Fascism). It was anthologised in Eco's "Cinque scritti morali" (Five Moral Pieces) in 1997, and has been both anthologised and released independently since.

== See also ==
- Definitions of fascism – Theories about the phenomenon of fascism
- Enemy of the people – Designation for political opponents of ruling power
- Fascist education – Systems and culture of education under fascist governments
- Reactionary modernism – Political ideology characterized by embrace of technology and anti-Enlightenment thought
