= Encarta Webster's Dictionary =

2004 English-language dictionary

The Encarta Webster's Dictionary of the English Language is an English-language dictionary published by Bloomsbury Publishing in 2004, with Anne H. Soukhanov as editor. It is the second edition of the Encarta World English Dictionary (1999), which was developed by Bloomsbury in collaboration with Microsoft.

The original dictionary was designed to cover varieties of English used throughout the English-speaking world. A CD-ROM version was released by Microsoft under its Encarta brand alongside the print editions.

== Development and publication ==
Compilation of the original dictionary took about three years. According to Microsoft's launch announcement, Soukhanov and Kathy Rooney, Bloomsbury's editor-in-chief, led more than 320 editors, lexicographers and consultants from 20 English-speaking countries. The team used computers and the Internet, including email, to research and compile the work. Soukhanov had previously been executive editor of The American Heritage Dictionary of the English Language.

Microsoft announced that the CD-ROM was scheduled for release on 4 August 1999, together with print editions from Bloomsbury in Britain, St. Martin's Press in the United States and Pan Macmillan in Australia. The British second edition was published in 2004 as the Bloomsbury English Dictionary.

== Scope and entry design ==
A feature of the dictionary is its use of "quick definitions": short summaries that precede the full definitions. In the printed dictionary these appear in small capitals, intended to let readers locate a meaning without reading through an entire entry. Scientific and technical definitions were intended to be understandable to readers without specialist knowledge.

Its treatment of regional vocabulary included words and meanings used outside Britain and the United States. Examples discussed in a contemporary review included biodata, used in South Asian English for a curriculum vitae, and the Canadian use of bagman for a fundraiser. Microsoft described the dictionary's coverage at launch as 400,000 references. It also contained biographical and geographical information and short essays on 38 varieties of English, including Australian English and African-American vernacular English.

== Electronic and college editions ==
The CD-ROM dictionary was included in Encarta Reference Suite 2000, alongside Encarta Encyclopedia Deluxe 2000 and Encarta Interactive World Atlas. By 2001, Microsoft also offered the dictionary on its Encarta website, where users could consult definitions and usage notes and hear words pronounced.

The Microsoft Encarta College Dictionary appeared in 2001. Soukhanov told The Washington Post that, although the new book was not based on the full-size dictionary, it drew on the same unabridged database as the World English Dictionary and was geared towards students and office workers. Its spelling aids included frequently misspelled words entered under their incorrect spellings, crossed out and cross-referenced to the correct forms. "Spellcheck" notes distinguished homophones, while usage notes addressed questions of correct usage. A second edition was published by Bloomsbury in 2005 as the Encarta Webster's College Dictionary, with Soukhanov as U.S. general editor.

== Reception ==
Reviewing the 1999 dictionary in Wired, Constance Hale praised its definitions, pronunciation system and explanations of regional English, while questioning some of its cultural notes and slang selections. In Verbatim, Howard Richler (Note: The review appeared without a byline; the magazine identified Richler as its author in the following issue.) welcomed the accessibility of its scientific definitions and its coverage of regional vocabulary, but identified omissions from Indian, Australian and other varieties of English.

Reviewing the 2004 British edition in The Spectator, Christopher Howse criticised the retention of many errors from the first edition. He noted that a definition of the Oxford Movement that had been mocked by a reviewer in the Times Literary Supplement remained unchanged, as did the dictionary's description of the ring diacritic used in Scandinavian languages as an angstrom.

In a 2020 retrospective, lexicographer Orin Hargraves, who had worked on the original dictionary, attributed its failure to the attempt to write a dictionary from scratch in three years, using internationally dispersed lexicographers with "little training, varying ability, and wavering commitment". He nevertheless considered thousands of its definitions solid and original, and reported that no titles drawn from the dictionary's data remained in print at that time.

== Publication data ==
Full-size editions

- Soukhanov, Anne H., ed. (1999). Encarta World English Dictionary. New York: St. Martin's Press. ISBN 978-0-312-22222-2. OCLC 41176615. xxxii, 2078 pp.
- Soukhanov, Anne H., ed. (2004). Encarta Webster's Dictionary of the English Language (2nd ed.). New York: Bloomsbury USA. ISBN 978-1-58234-510-9. OCLC 56713848.

College editions

- Soukhanov, Anne H., ed. (2001). Microsoft Encarta College Dictionary: The First Dictionary for the Internet Age. New York: St. Martin's Press. ISBN 978-0-312-28087-1. OCLC 46918270. xli, 1678 pp.
- Soukhanov, Anne H., ed. (2005). Encarta Webster's College Dictionary (2nd U.S. ed.). New York: Bloomsbury USA. ISBN 978-1-59691-085-0. OCLC 61728031. xli, 1678 pp.

== See also ==
- Webster's Dictionary
- Comparison of English dictionaries
