= Katherine Barber =

Canadian lexicographer (1959–2021)

- Born: September 8, 1959; Ely, Cambridgeshire, England
- Died: April 24, 2021 (aged 61); Toronto, Ontario, Canada
- Education: University of Winnipeg (B.A.); University of Ottawa (M.A.)
- Occupations: Lexicographer; editor

Katherine Patricia Mary Barber (September 8, 1959 – April 24, 2021) was a British-born Canadian lexicographer and founding Editor-in-Chief of the Canadian Oxford Dictionary. To promote the dictionary she often spoke publicly about Canadian words on radio and television, picking up the moniker "The Word Lady."

== Biography ==
Katherine Patricia Mary Barber was born in Ely, Cambridgeshire, England, on September 8, 1959. Both her parents were Canadian; her father Gordon was serving with the Royal Air Force at the time. In 1967, the family moved to Winnipeg, where her father took an administrative job with the dental school at the University of Manitoba. Katherine's mother Patricia (née Clarke) taught English at the local high school. She received a Bachelor of Arts degree from the University of Winnipeg in 1980 and a Master of Arts from the University of Ottawa in 1990.

From 1984 to 1991, she was a lecturer in the School of Translation and Interpretation at the University of Ottawa. In 1991 Barber was hired by Oxford University Press Canada to compile the country’s first comprehensive dictionary. Barber led a comprehensive search for "Canadianisms," looking not only through literature and newspapers but also advertisements, magazines and paperback romances. The first edition of the Canadian Oxford Dictionary included around 2,000 unique Canadian words and phrases. For recognition of the dictionary, Barber was awarded the Editor of the Year Libris Award from the Canadian Booksellers Association. Barber made a number of radio and television appearances to promote the dictionary, which led to a regular word history segment on CBC Radio Toronto's Metro Morning, from 1996 to 2001. From 1989 to 1991, she was a research associate with the Bilingual Canadian Dictionary project at the University of Ottawa. She was Editor-in-Chief of Canadian Dictionaries for Oxford University Press (OUP) in Canada from 1991 to 2008, when OUP closed the Canadian dictionary department.

Starting in 2008, she was the sole proprietor of Tours en l'air Ballet Holidays, which organized ballet-themed trips to North American and European destinations.

Barber died on April 24, 2021, in Toronto from brain cancer. Barber was buried at the Riverside Cemetery in Hartney, Manitoba.

== Other publications ==
- Katherine Barber (2006) Six Words You Never Knew Had Something to Do with Pigs and Other Fascinating Facts About the Language from Canada's Word Lady, Don Mills, Ontario: Oxford University Press. ISBN 978-0-19-542440-9.
- Katherine Barber (2007) Only in Canada You Say: A Treasury of Canadian Language, Don Mills, Ontario: Oxford University Press. ISBN 978-0-19-542707-3.
