= Dicționarul explicativ al limbii române =

Romanian language dictionary

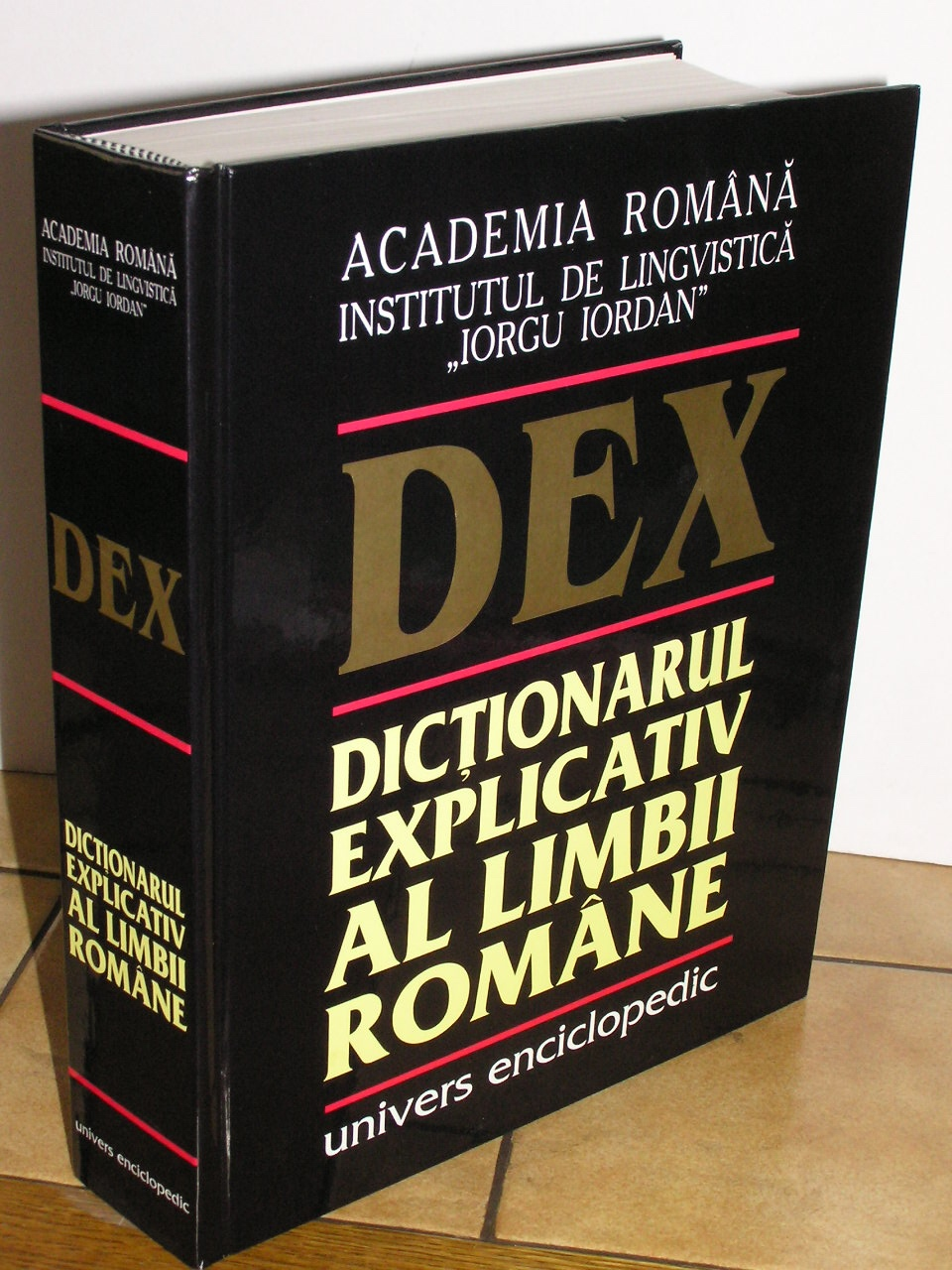
DEX, 1998

Dicționarul explicativ al limbii române ("The Explanatory Dictionary of the Romanian Language", known under the abbreviation of DEX) is the most important dictionary of the Romanian language. It is published and edited by the "Iorgu Iordan – Alexandru Rosetti" Institute of Linguistics of the Romanian Academy.

== History ==
It was first published in 1975 by the Romanian Academy. Compared to other dictionaries before it, such as the Dictionarul limbii române literare contemporane (DLRLC) and Dictionarul limbii române moderne (DLRM), it included more regional and archaic words. In 1988 a supplement, named DEX-S, was published, which included omissions of the previous edition. The second edition was published in 1996 and it included some new definitions and the spelling changes of 1993. This edition has over 65,000 main entries. The latest edition was published in 2016 and contains 67,000 entries.
