= Dictionary of Contemporary Finnish =

Dictionary of the modern Finnish language

- Cover of the first part
- Author: Eija-Riitta Grönros
- Cover artist: Markus Itkonen
- Language: Finnish
- Genre: Dictionary
- Publisher: Institute for the Languages of Finland
- Publication date: 2006; 20 years ago
- Pages: 713 + 739 + 691
- ISBN: 952-5446-20-4

Dictionary of Contemporary Finnish (Finnish: Kielitoimiston sanakirja, previously known as the New Dictionary of Modern Finnish) is the most recent dictionary of the modern Finnish language. It is edited by the Institute for the Languages of Finland. The current printed edition was first published in 2006 and is based on the 2004 digital version of the same name. The printed version lacks some features of the electronic version, such as the latter's index of Finnish place names (asuinpaikkahakemisto).

The dictionary is monolingual and attempts to "accurately reflect standard Finnish as it is used today". It explains the meanings of most headwords and provides information about their spelling, inflected forms, stylistic register, usage, and context.

== Scope ==
The dictionary consists of almost 100,000 entries. It is an expanded and modernized version of the Suomen kielen perussanakirja (Basic Dictionary of the Finnish Language), printed between 1990 and 1994 (and digitalized as the CD-Perussanakirja in 1997). Compared to the Suomen kielen perussanakirja, the 2006 edition has about 6,500 new entries and about 20,000 modified entries. Together with the Nykysuomen sanakirja, the new dictionaries form a very comprehensive collection of information on the modern Finnish language.

== See also ==
- Nykysuomen sanakirja
