= Canadian Oxford Dictionary =

Canadian English dictionary

The Canadian Oxford Dictionary is a dictionary of Canadian English. First published by Oxford University Press Canada in 1998, it became a well-known reference for Canadian English.

The second edition, published on June 30, 2004, contains about 300,000 entries, including about 2,200 true Canadianisms. It also provides information on Canadian pronunciation and on Canadian spelling, which has features of both British and American spelling: colour, centre, and travelling, but tire, aluminum, and realize, resulting in combinations such as colourize.

== Editorial staff and development method ==
Until September 2008, Oxford maintained a permanent staff of lexicographers in Canada, led by editor Katherine Barber. With its Canadian dictionary division closed, Oxford has since been outsourcing work on Canadian dictionary products to freelance editors.

== Editions and versions ==
- Barber, Katherine, ed. (2005). Canadian Oxford Dictionary (2nd ed.). Don Mills, Ontario: Oxford University Press. ISBN 978-0-19-541816-3.

Prior editions

- Barber, Katherine, ed. (2002). The Canadian Oxford Dictionary. Don Mills, Ontario: Oxford University Press. ISBN 978-0-19-541731-9.
- Barber, Katherine, ed. (1998). The Canadian Oxford Dictionary. Don Mills, Ontario: Oxford University Press. ISBN 978-0-19-541120-1.

Picture dictionary

- Adelson-Goldstein, Jayme; Shapiro, Norma, eds. (2010). Oxford Picture Dictionary, Second Canadian Edition (Monolingual, 2nd ed.). Don Mills, Ontario: Oxford University Press. ISBN 978-0-19-543809-3.
- Parnwell, E.C.; Grennan, Maggie, eds. (2004). The Canadian Oxford Picture Dictionary. Don Mills, Ontario: Oxford University Press. ISBN 978-0-19-435207-9.
- Parnwell, E.C.; Grennan, Maggie, eds. (2001). The Canadian Oxford Picture Dictionary. Don Mills, Ontario: Oxford University Press. ISBN 978-0-19-435204-8.

Paperback

- Alex Bisset, editor. The Canadian Oxford Paperback Dictionary (first edition 2000, reissued 2004, second edition 2006) Toronto, Oxford University Press.

Compact

- The Canadian Oxford Compact Dictionary (published 2001, reissued 2004)

Concise

- Concise Canadian Oxford Dictionary (published 2005)

High school

- The Canadian Oxford High School Dictionary (published 2002, reissued 2004)

Spelling

- The Canadian Oxford Spelling Dictionary (published 1999, reissued 2004)

Juvenile

- My First Canadian Oxford Dictionary

== Other Canadian English dictionaries ==
Two other major Canadian English dictionaries are the ITP Nelson Canadian Dictionary and the Gage Canadian Dictionary.

== See also ==
- List of Canadian English dictionaries
