= The Vocabula Review =

The Vocabula Review was a monthly electronic magazine about the state of the English language.

== Publication ==
The journal was published online by the Vocabula Communications Company. Online access was by subscription. All previous issues were accessible online. The editor-in-chief and publisher was Robert Hartwell Fiske. He was the editor of two collections of essays and poems that were previously published in The Vocabula Review: Vocabula Bound 1: Outbursts, Insights, Explanations, and Oddities and Vocabula Bound 2: Our Wresting, Writhing Tongue. Fiske also authored The Dimwit's Dictionary, a volume on over-used English words.

The magazine's guiding philosophy of the English language tended to be anti-linguist and prescriptive, promoting prose that is elegant, clear, and precise.

== History ==
The magazine was first published in September 1999. From January 2005, articles also appeared in a print version, the Vocabula Bound Quarterly.
