= Nykysuomen sanakirja =

Finnish language dictionary

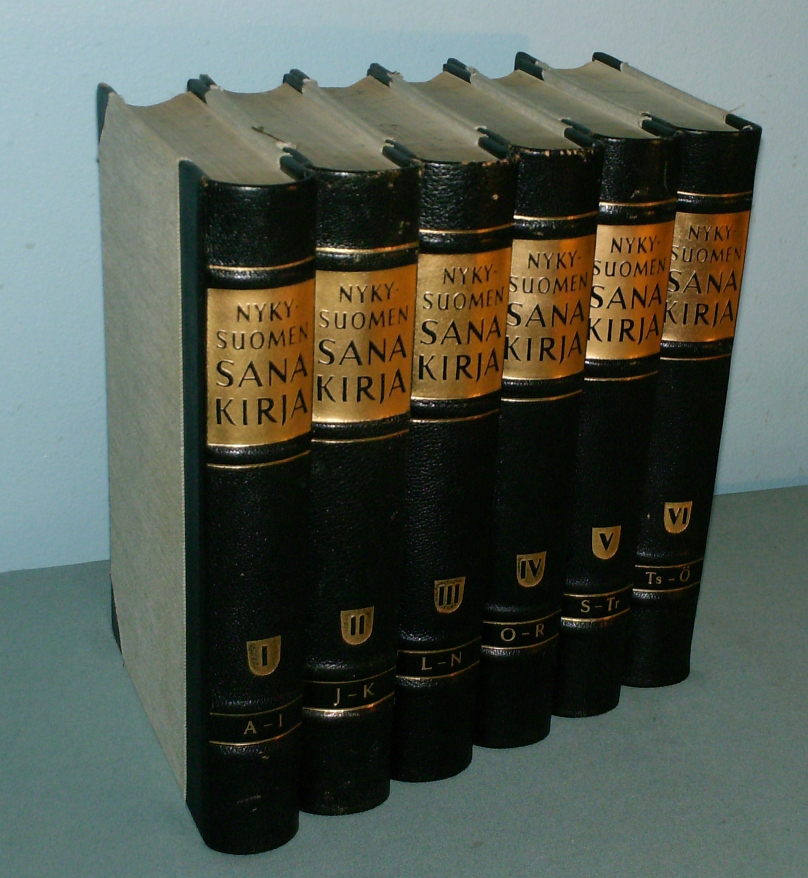
A set of Nykysuomen sanakirja from the 1950s.

Nykysuomen sanakirja (The Dictionary of Modern Finnish or The Dictionary of Contemporary Finnish) is a Finnish language dictionary published between 1951 and 1961 in six separate volumes. The dictionary was edited by the Finnish Literature Society and published by WSOY. It is the first monolingual Finnish dictionary and has over 201,000 headwords. It is the most comprehensive Finnish language dictionary. Throughout the years, it has enjoyed major academic significance. The dictionary has never been updated: all later editions contain the same content, which reflects the language as it was before the mid-20th century. The need for a modern dictionary has led to the publication of The New Dictionary of Modern Finnish.

== History ==
The dictionary was initiated on 17 November 1927 by the decision of Eduskunta because, reportedly, there had been problems with word ambiguity and clarity in law-making. The initial roadmap was drafted in 1927 and 1928 and the Finnish Literature Society was given a grant for the development of the book. The first editor-in-chief was professor Martti Airila, who was followed in 1939 by professor Matti Sadeniemi.

The Second World War almost completely stalled the editorial work. In 1945 the dictionary had reached the letter L. The first volume was published in 1951, followed by five more volumes. The last volume was printed in 1961. An abbreviated "people's edition" was published in 1967, consisting of three volumes.

The original version remains unchanged—the dictionary only reflects the language as it was no later than 1961. There have been numerous reprintings: 15th edition was published in 2002.

Because the dictionary only reflects relatively dated language, and because the colloquial language in particular has greatly changed, it has been partly replaced by KOTUS's dictionaries during the 1990s, especially in regards to today's modern language. They include: The Basic Dictionary of the Finnish Language (Suomen kielen perussanakirja), published between 1990 and 1994, and its revised version The New Dictionary of Modern Finnish (Kielitoimiston sanakirja), published in 2006. However, Nykysuomen sanakirja remains the most comprehensive Finnish language dictionary as it contains over 201,000 headwords, far more comprehensive than the under 100,000 headwords of the Research Institute for the Languages of Finland dictionaries.

== Style ==
Nykysuomen sanakirja is a normative-descriptive dictionary: in addition to definitions of the words it also contains recommendations for proper use of the words. Each headword has a number, which gives its index in the word inflection table as presented in the beginning of the book. Words are defined by compact descriptions, and with the use of synonyms, followed by example phrases and compound word examples.

== See also ==
- The New Dictionary of Modern Finnish
