= Gage Canadian Dictionary =

Dictionary

The Gage Canadian Dictionary ISBN 0771519818 is a dictionary for Canadian English published by Gage Publishers in Vancouver, British Columbia, Canada. The dictionary contains over 140,000 entry words with definitions, International Phonetic Alphabet pronunciation key, homonyms and synonyms. In addition, the dictionary contains many illustrations and photos.

It was first published in 1967 as Dictionary of Canadian English: The Senior Dictionary, with a subsequent edition under the same title in 1973, and a further one as Canadian Senior Dictionary in 1979. This was followed by an edition as The Gage Canadian Dictionary in 1983, and a revised edition in 1997. (ISBN 9780771573996). The most recent editions are under the title Collins Gage Canadian dictionary (2009) and Nelson Gage Canadian paperback dictionary in 2013.

An abridged version was published as Gage Canadian concise dictionary in 2002, and a children's and intermediate versions in various years.

== See also ==
- List of Canadian English dictionaries
