= Dictionary of Newfoundland English =

The Dictionary of Newfoundland English is a regional dictionary edited by G. M. Story, W.J. Kirwin, and J.D.A Widdowson, first published by Toronto University Press in 1982. Based out of Memorial University of Newfoundland, it is an internationally acclaimed piece of scholarship and an important addition to the preservation of Newfoundland culture. Published in the wake of Newfoundland's cultural renaissance of the 1960s and 1970s, the goal of the dictionary was to catalogue "words and idioms which appear to have been recorded first, or solely, in Newfoundland." It has gone on to have several re-printings and in 1990 there was a second edition published.

While collecting for the dictionary, the editors had a surplus of over 77,000 words that did not make it into the final publication. These words and their definitions are currently stored at the Memorial University Folklore and Language Archives (MUNFLA).
