= Webster's New World Dictionary =

American dictionary

- Published: 1951
- Publisher: Houghton Mifflin Harcourt, HarperCollins
- Media type: Dictionary

Webster's New World Dictionary of the American Language is an American dictionary published first in 1951. As of 2022, the work is owned by HarperCollins Publishers.

== Overview ==
The first edition was published by the World Publishing Company of Cleveland, Ohio, in two volumes or one large volume, including a large encyclopedic section. In 1953, World published a one-volume college edition, Webster's New World College Dictionary, without the encyclopedic material. It was edited by Joseph H. Friend and David B. Guralnik and contained 142,000 entries, said to be the largest American desk dictionary available at the time.

The second college edition, edited by Guralnik, was published in 1970. World Publishing was acquired by Simon & Schuster in 1980 and they continued the work with a third edition under their Prentice-Hall imprint in 1989 edited by Victoria Neufeldt. A fourth edition was edited by Michael Agnes and published by John Wiley & Sons in 1999, containing 160,000 entries.

The fifth edition, edited by Andrew N. Sparks et al. and published by Houghton Mifflin Harcourt in 2014, contains around 165,000 entries and 1703 pages. An updated version was published in 2020 and consists of 1728 pages.

One of the salient features of Webster's New World dictionaries has been its unusually full etymology, that is, the origin and development of words and the relationship of words to other Indo-European languages. The work also labels words which have a distinctly American origin.

The college edition is the official desk dictionary of The New York Times, The Wall Street Journal, The Washington Post, and United Press International. It was the primary dictionary of the AP Stylebook from 1977 until 2024, when it reverted to the Merriam-Webster Collegiate Dictionary.

== Publisher ==
Although the title refers to Noah Webster, the work is unrelated to the series of Webster's dictionaries published by Merriam-Webster Inc, which descend directly from Noah Webster's original publications. By contrast, Webster's New World Dictionary merely cites Webster as a generic name for any American English dictionary, as does Random House's line of Webster's Unabridged and derived dictionaries.

Webster's New World student and children's editions were produced for younger readers but were discontinued in 1996. Dictionaries for foreign languages, American English, Large Print, and English writing style guides have also been produced.

As of 2024, the current publisher, HarperCollins, offers the following editions:

- Webster's New World College Dictionary, Fifth Edition updated (2020, hardcover, 1728 pages)
- Webster’s New World Dictionary, Fifth Edition (2016, paperback, 752 pages)
- Webster's New World Pocket Dictionary, Fourth Edition (2016, paperback, 384 pages)
- Webster’s New World Crossword Puzzle Dictionary, 2nd Ed. (2017, paperback, 672 pages)
