= Collins COBUILD Advanced Dictionary =

- First edition
- ISBN: 0-00-370023-2

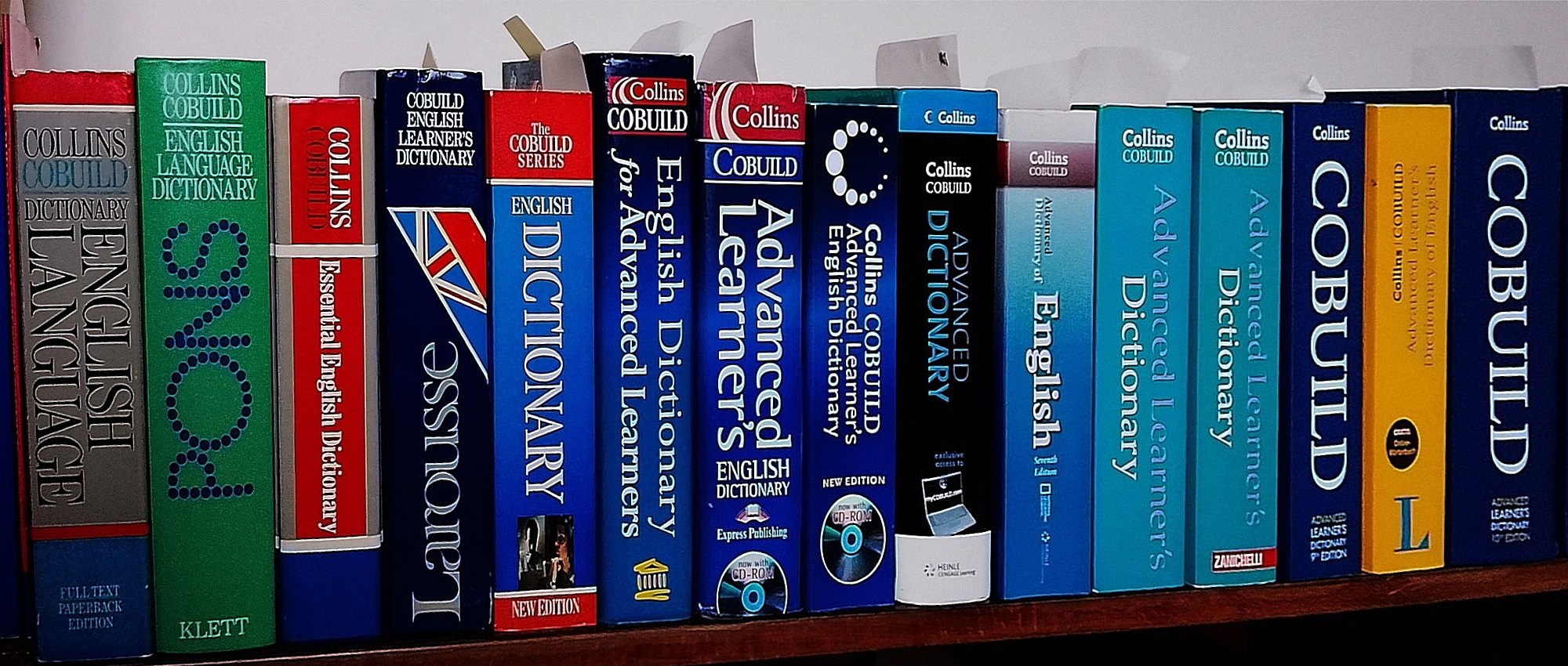
Some Collins COBUILD dictionaries for advanced students of English: 1st edition on the left, 10th edition on the right.

The Collins COBUILD Advanced Dictionary (CCAD) from HarperCollins, first published in 1987, is a dictionary that distinguished itself by providing definitions in full sentences, rather than excerpted phrases. Example sentences are given for almost every meaning of every word, and all of them were drawn from a text corpus (COBUILD) of actual usage.

The dictionary includes phonetic transcriptions based on the International Phonetic Alphabet (IPA). In some editions, a digital version on CD-ROM was included with the dictionary in book form.

== Collins COBUILD Advanced Dictionary of American English ==
There is an American English equivalent titled Collins COBUILD Advanced Dictionary of American English, which was originally published in 2006 (2nd edition in 2016, 3rd edition 2023 as Collins COBUILD Advanced American English Dictionary ISBN 978-0-00-860778-4).

== Editions ==
- First edition published in 1987 as Collins COBUILD English Language Dictionary ISBN 978-0-00-370023-7
- Second edition published in 1995 as Collins COBUILD English Dictionary ISBN 978-0-00-370941-4
- Third edition published in 2001 as Collins COBUILD English Dictionary for Advanced Learners ISBN 978-0-00-375115-4
- Fourth edition published in 2003 as Collins COBUILD Advanced Learner's English Dictionary ISBN 978-1-84466-082-7
- Fifth edition published in 2006 as Collins COBUILD Advanced Learner's English Dictionary ISBN 978-0-00-721012-1
- Sixth edition published in 2009 as Collins COBUILD Advanced Dictionary ISBN 978-1-4240-2926-6
- Seventh edition published in 2012 as Collins COBUILD Advanced Dictionary of English ISBN 978-1-133-31409-7
- Eighth edition published in 2014 as Collins COBUILD Advanced Learner's Dictionary ISBN 978-0-00-758058-3
- Ninth edition published in 2018 as Collins COBUILD Advanced Learner's Dictionary ISBN 978-0-00-825321-9
- Tenth edition published in 2023 as Collins COBUILD Advanced Learner's Dictionary ISBN 978-0-00-844490-7
