= COBUILD =

Language database

COBUILD, an acronym for Collins Birmingham University International Language Database, is a British research facility set up at the University of Birmingham in 1980 and funded by Collins publishers.

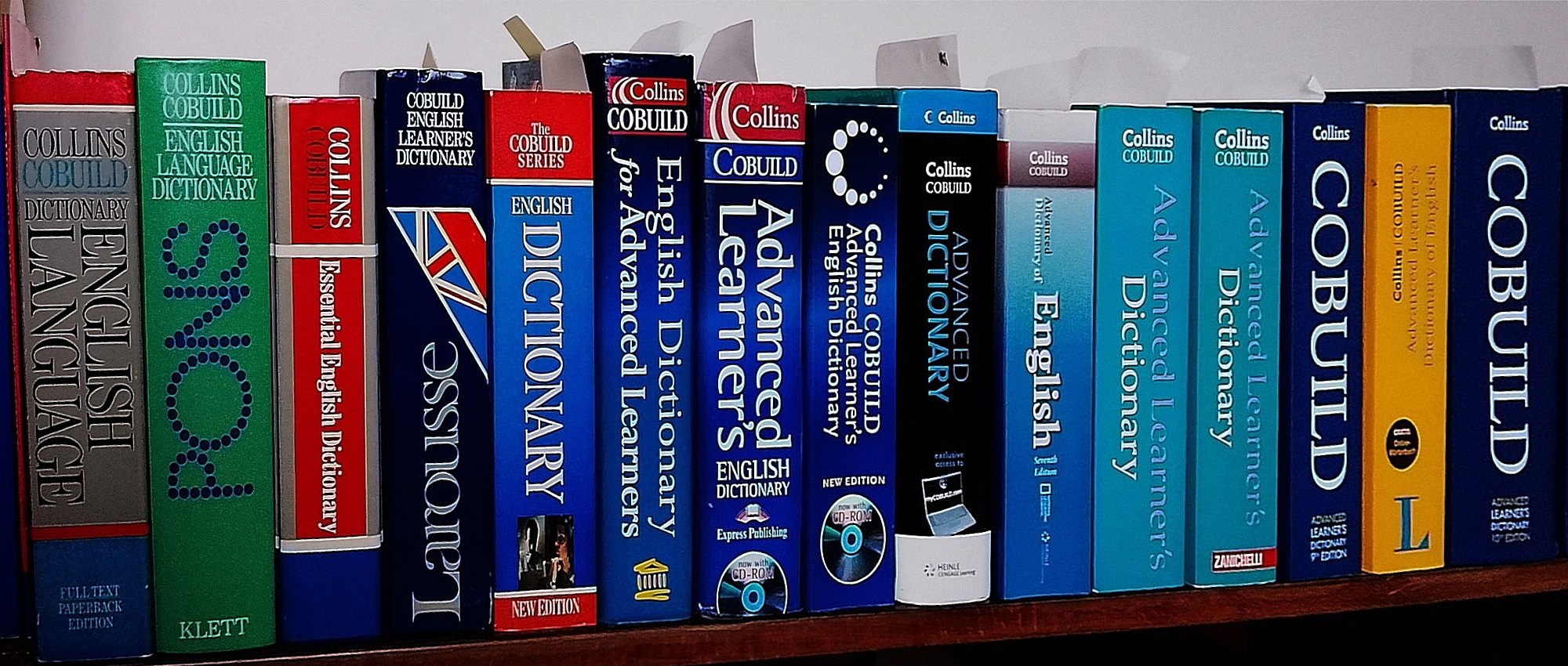
Some COBUILD dictionaries. 1st left: Collins COBUILD English Language Dictionary (1987) first edition; 1st right: Collins COBUILD Advanced Learner's Dictionary (2023) tenth edition. Some books published jointly with other publishers: Klett, Larousse, Express Publishing, Zanichelli, Langenscheidt.

The facility was initially led by professor John Sinclair. The most important achievements of the COBUILD project have been the creation and analysis of an electronic corpus of contemporary text, the Collins Corpus, later leading to the development of the Bank of English, and the production of the monolingual learner's dictionary Collins COBUILD English Language Dictionary, based on the study of the COBUILD corpus and first published in 1987.

A collection of other dictionaries and grammars have also been published, all based exclusively on the evidence from the Bank of English.
