= Specialized lexicography =

Specialized lexicography is an academic discipline that is concerned with development of theories and principles for the design, compilation, use and evaluation of specialized dictionaries. A specialized dictionary is a dictionary that covers a relatively restricted set of phenomena, usually within one or more subject fields. An alternative term for this type of dictionary is LSP dictionary.

== Various aspects of specialized lexicography ==
The study of specialized lexicography deals with several important aspects within the general field of lexicography. The problems involved in designing and making bilingual dictionaries within a culture-dependent subject field involves aspects such as the user's linguistic competence in both languages as well as the user's extra-linguistic (factual) competence in both cultures.

As described in Nielsen 1994, the coverage of dictionaries may be divided into three lexicographically relevant types. First, the multi-field dictionary, which covers several subject-fields; secondly, the single-field dictionary, which covers one subject-field; and thirdly, the sub-field dictionary, which covers one sub-field within a general subject-field. This distinction is lexicographically important, because the best treatment of a subject-field is given in single-field and sub-field dictionaries, as these are the best reference tools for containing and presenting the relevant data.

The function for which the dictionary has been designed is also relevant. The dictionary may have been designed to help the user with two general types of function: communication-oriented and knowledge-oriented. The former deals with the translation of texts, understanding of texts, production of texts and editing/revision of texts, and the latter deals with the acquisition of knowledge (data and information) in situations that are independent of communication.

Specialized lexicography is therefore the discipline where scholars attempt to develop principles and techniques that can help both the compilers of dictionaries and the users. Nielsen 2008 argues that, in particular, the presentation of data in the dictionary should be structured in such a way that the lexicographic information costs are kept at a minimum.

== See also ==
- Controlled vocabulary
- Lexigraf
- Terminology

== Relevant literature ==
- Henning Bergenholtz/Sven Tarp (eds.) (1995): Manual of Specialised Lexicography. Benjamins Publishing.
- Sandro Nielsen (1994): The Bilingual LSP Dictionary. Gunter Narr Verlag.
- Sandro Nielsen (2008): The Effect of Lexicographical Information Costs on Dictionary Making and Use. Lexikos 18-2008: 170-189.
- Sandro Nielsen (2010): "Specialised Translation Dictionaries for Learners". In: P. A. Fuertes-Olivera (ed): Specialised Dictionaries for Learners. Berlin/New York: de Gruyter, 69-82.
