= List of online dictionaries =

An online dictionary is a dictionary that is accessible via the Internet through a web browser. They can be made available in a number of ways: free, free with a paid subscription for extended or more professional content, or a paid-only service. Many dictionaries have been digitized from their print versions and are available at online libraries. Some online dictionaries are organized as lists of words, similar to a glossary, while others offer search features, reverse lookups, and additional language tools and content such as verb conjugations, grammar references, and discussion forums. The variety of online dictionaries for specialized topics is enormous, covering a wide range of fields such as computing, business and investing, along with almost any other class of trade, science, art, or common interest with its own terminology.

== Selected online dictionaries ==
The following is a concise list of online English dictionaries whose definitions are based upon well-established content.

- American Heritage Dictionary American Heritage Dictionary of the English Language, Fifth Ed.
- Collins Online Dictionary Collins Unabridged English Dictionary; Collins Unabridged Thesaurus; Collins Webster's American English Dictionary
- Dictionary.com Dictionary.com Unabridged, based on the Random House Webster's Unabridged Dictionary
- Merriam-Webster Online Merriam-Webster Online Dictionary

=== Advanced learner's dictionaries ===
- Cambridge Dictionaries Online Cambridge Advanced Learner's Dictionary
- Longman Longman Dictionary of Contemporary English
- Macmillan Macmillan English Dictionary for Advanced Learners
- Oxford Advanced Learner's Dictionary Oxford Advanced Learner's Dictionary

== Other examples ==
=== Multilingual ===
- LEO (website) collaborative dictionary for German
- LexSite non-collaborative English-Russian dictionary with contextual phrases
- Linguee collaborative dictionary and contextual sentences
- Madura English-Sinhala Dictionary free English to Sinhala and vice versa
- Multitran multilingual online dictionary centered on Russian, and provides an opportunity of adding own translation
- Reverso collaborative dictionary and contextual translations
- Ultralingua free and premium multilingual dictionary
- Wiktionary collaborative project run by the Wikimedia Foundation
- WWWJDIC Japanese–English

=== English language ===
- Free On-line Dictionary of Computing
- Logos Dictionary free online with additional premium content
- Online Etymology Dictionary
- Urban Dictionary a user-supplied "dictionary" of slang
- WordNet word database
- Wordnik
- Wordweb free and premium online English thesaurus and dictionary for Windows

=== Other specific languages ===
- Academic Dictionary of Lithuanian
- Comprehensive Aramaic Lexicon
- Diccionario de la lengua española Spanish dictionary
- Dictionary of the Russian Language (Ozhegov) Russian dictionary
- Dictionary of the Scots Language
- Dictionnaire de l'Académie française French dictionary
- Duden German dictionary
- e-mahashabdkosh bi-lingual and bi-directional Hindi/English dictionaries
- Ekşi Sözlük Turkish collaborative dictionary
- Geiriadur Prifysgol Cymru an online dictionary of the Welsh language
- Plena Ilustrita Vortaro de Esperanto Esperanto dictionary
- Reta Vortaro Esperanto dictionary
- Susning.nu free Swedish online dictionary, opened 2001, now defunct
- Svenska Akademiens ordbok Swedish dictionary
- Van Dale dictionary of the Dutch language
- William Whitaker's Words Latin dictionary
- Woordenboek der Nederlandsche Taal dictionary of the Dutch language (free registration required)
- Yeminlisozluk Turkish translators' dictionary

== See also ==
- Electronic dictionary
- Thesaurus
- List of online encyclopedias
