= Outline of commercial law =

"I have treated within the purview of commercial law all those legal principles, from whatever branch of law they are drawn, which regularly surface in commercial disputes. It has long seemed to me that there is an unfortunate gulf between the commercial lawyer and the property and equity lawyer. Contract, sale of goods and negotiable instruments are accepted as falling within the domain of the former, equitable interests and conflicting real rights within the latter's field of expertise. But in the world of business, problems do not divide themselves into neat packages. ... The practitioner has to be familiar with the principles of each of these fields of law in order to be able to give sound advice to his client."
-- Professor Sir Roy Goode, QC

The following outline is provided as an overview of and topical guide to commercial law:

Commercial law – body of law that governs business and commercial transactions. It is often considered to be a branch of civil law and deals with issues of both private law and public law. It is also called business law.

== What type of thing is commercial law? ==
Commercial law can be described as all of the following:

- Branch of law – law is a system of rules and guidelines which are enforced through social institutions to govern behavior, wherever possible.

== Branches of commercial law ==
- Companies law
  - Corporate law
  - Corporate governance
- Competition law (antitrust)
- Consumer protection
- Contract law
- Environmental law
- Intellectual property law
  - Copyright law
  - Patent law
  - Trademark law
- International trade law
- Labour law
- Insurance law

=== By region ===
- European company law
  - French company law
  - German company law
  - United Kingdom company law
    - Unfair prejudice in United Kingdom company law
- Corporate law in Vietnam
- United States corporate law

== Closely related areas of law ==
- Legal aspects of computing
- Ecommerce Law
- Privacy law
- Property law
- Tax law

== Commercial law occupations ==
- Corporate lawyer

== History of commercial law ==
- History of companies
- History of company law in the United Kingdom
  - Lex mercatoria

== Business entities ==
- Types of business entity
- Juristic person
  - Company (law)
  - Corporate law
    - Corporation
    - Incorporation (business)
      - Delaware corporation (U.S.)
  - Limited liability company
  - Fiduciary
    - Partnership
    - Agency
      - Escrow
    - Trustee of a trust or executor of an estate; see also trusts and estates
      - Charitable trust
  - Foundation
  - Association
  - Cooperative

== Contracts ==
- Contract
  - Consideration
  - Duress
  - Warranty
  - Breach of contract
    - Remedy
      - Lien
  - Types of contracts
    - Adhesion contract

== Intellectual property ==
- Intellectual property
  - Agreement on Trade-Related Aspects of Intellectual Property Rights (TRIPs)
  - Public domain
  - Trade secret
  - Patent
  - Trademark
    - Genericized trademark
    - People's Republic of China's trademark law
  - Copyright
    - Fair dealing
    - Copyright infringement of software
    - List of copyright case law
- Industrial design rights

== Dispute resolution ==
- Dispute resolution
  - Alternative dispute resolution
    - Mediation
    - Conciliation
    - Negotiation
  - Arbitration
    - Binding arbitration

== General commercial law concepts ==
- Employment
  - Sexual harassment
  - Non-disclosure agreement
- Bankruptcy
- Blue law
- Civil law notary
- Class action
- Cyber law
  - Online Copyright Infringement Liability Limitation Act
- estoppel
- Financial regulation
- Fraud deterrence
- International trade law
- Law and economics
- Land use
- Letter of credit
- Malpractice
- Notary public
- Negotiable instruments
- Property law
  - Real property
  - Security interest
    - Mechanics lien
- Product liability
  - Negligence
  - Proximate cause
  - Mandatory labelling
- Racketeer Influenced and Corrupt Organizations Act
- Release
- Torts
- Uniform Commercial Code
- Lex mercatoria

== Commercial law organizations ==
- International Technology Law Association
- Student Intellectual Property Law Association
- American Law and Economics Association

== Commercial law publications ==
- Columbia Business Law Review
- Currents
- European Business Law Review
- Florida State University Business Review
- Law and Business Review of the Americas

== See also ==
- Outline of law
- Outline of business management
- Outline of marketing
- Outline of economics
- Outline of management
- Principles of International Commercial Contracts
- Outline of production
- List of international trade topics
- List of accounting topics
- List of business theorists
- List of economists
- Sales tax
- Legal lexicography
  - Law dictionary
