= Law dictionary =

Dictionary compiled to define legal terms

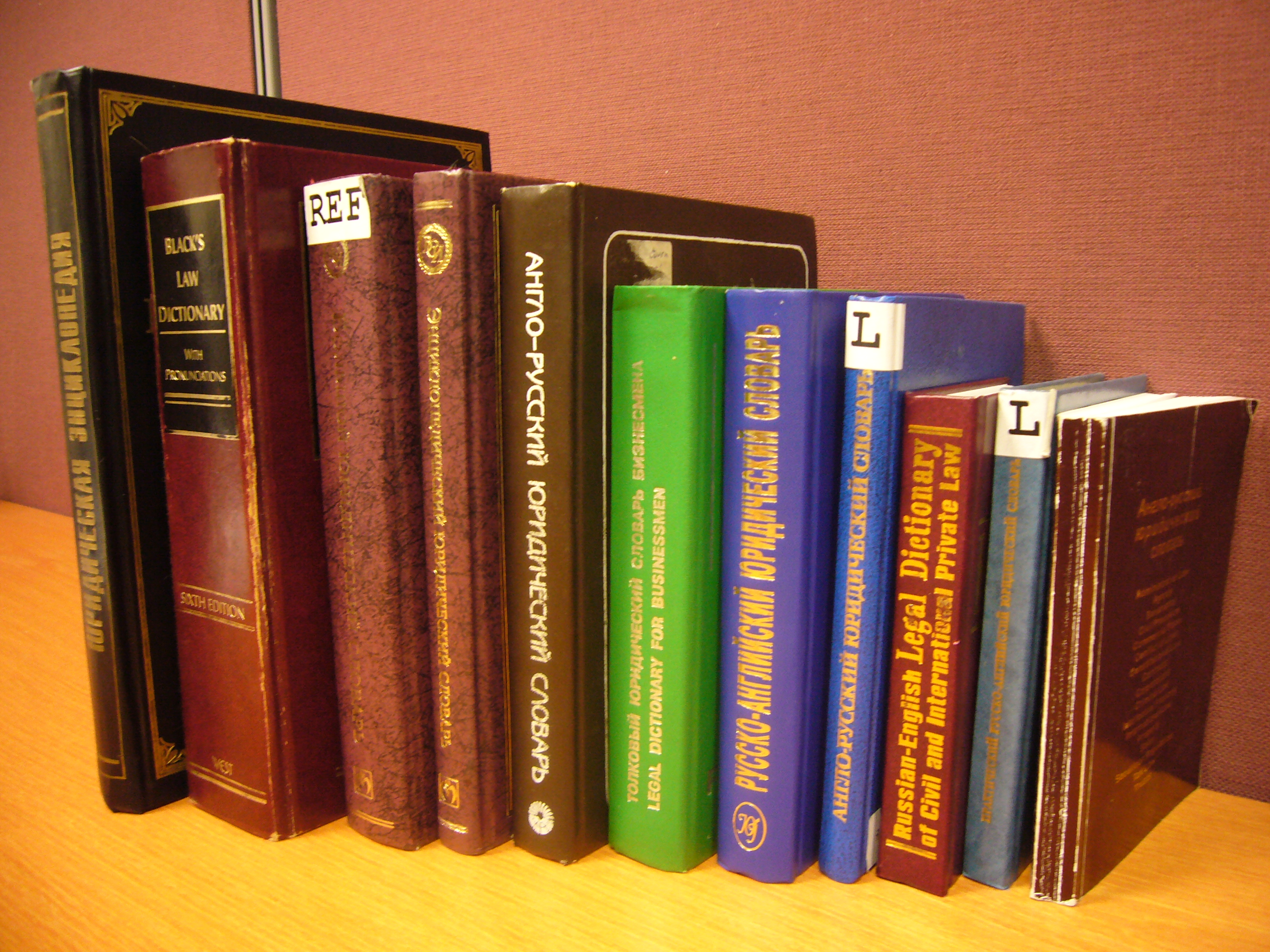
Several English and Russian legal dictionaries

A law dictionary (also known as legal dictionary) is a dictionary that is designed and compiled to give information about terms used in the field of law.

== Types ==
Distinctions are made among various types of law dictionaries.

Differentiating factors include:

- Number of languages covered: a monolingual law dictionary covers one language, a bilingual covers two.
- Number of fields covered: a single-field dictionary covers an entire field of law, whereas a sub-field dictionary covers a part of a field of law, e.g. a dictionary of contract law.

== Quality ==
A good bilingual or multilingual law dictionary needs to take the users' expected languages and professional competences into account. The lexicographers therefore must consider the following aspects: dictionary user research, dictionary typology, structure, and presentation of relevant information. When making a law dictionary, the lexicographers attempt to present the information in such a way that the user is not burdened with excessive lexicographic information costs.

== Functions ==
As pointed out by Sandro Nielsen in 1994, law dictionaries can serve various functions. The traditional law dictionary with definitions of legal terms serves to help users understand the legal texts they read (a communicative function) or to acquire knowledge about legal matters independent of any text (a cognitive function) – such law dictionaries are usually monolingual. Bilingual law dictionaries may also serve a variety of functions. First, some dictionaries have entry words in one language and definitions in another. These dictionaries help users understand legal texts, usually written in a foreign language, and acquire knowledge typically about a foreign legal system. Second, bilingual law dictionaries with entry words in one language and equivalents in another assist in translating legal texts into or from a foreign language, and sometimes also in producing legal texts, usually in a foreign language.

== Formats ==
With the advance of technology, the legal dictionary has made its way onto the Internet and smartphones. Law students and litigants can now look up the meaning of legal terms in seconds.

== Legal terminology textbook ==
Unlike a law dictionary, which arranges and defines legal words and phrases individually and in alphabetical order, a legal terminology textbook arranges and defines legal words and phrases in groups and by topic. As a result, a student or other person interested in understanding an array of related legal words and phrases may prefer to use a legal terminology textbook instead.

== Selected works ==
=== Australia ===
- Trischa Mann & Audrey Blunden, eds. Australian Law Dictionary, 3rd edn. Melbourne: Oxford University Press Australia & New Zealand, 2017.
- P. E. Nygh & Peter Butt, eds. LexisNexis Australian Legal Dictionary, 2nd edn. Chatswood, N.S.W.: LexisNexis Butterworths, 2016 (1st edn. Butterworth's Australian legal dictionary, 1998).

=== Canada ===
- Stephen Gerard Coughlan, John A. Yogis, & Catherine Cotter. Canadian Law Dictionary, 7th edn. Hauppauge, N.Y.: Barrons Educational Series, 2013.
- Anne Des Ormeaux & Jean-Marie Lessard. Legal Dictionary of Property in Canada: Common Law, Civil Law. 2 vols. Ottawa: Communications Branch, Dept. of Justice Canada, 2009.
- Nancy McCormack. The Dictionary of Canadian Law, 5th edn. Originally by Daphne A. Dukelow. Toronto: Thomson Reuters, 2020.
  - Nancy McCormack. Pocket Dictionary of Canadian Law, 6th edn. Originally by Daphne A. Dukelow. Toronto: Thomson Reuters, 2023.
- Kevin Patrick McGuinness. The Encyclopedic Dictionary of Canadian Law. 3 vols. Toronto: LexisNexis Canada, 2021.
- Hubert Reid & Simon Reid. Dictionnaire de droit québécois et canadien, 5th edn. Montreal: Wilson & Lafleur, 2015.

=== England & Wales ===
- Daniel Greenberg, ed. Jowitt's Dictionary of English Law, 5th edn. London: Sweet & Maxwell, 2015.
- Daniel Greenberg, ed. Stroud's Judicial Dictionary of Words and Phrases, 9th edn. London: Sweet & Maxwell, 2016.
- David Hay, ed. Words and Phrases Legally Defined, 5th edn. 4 vols. London: LexisNexis, 2018.

=== Ireland ===
- Brian Hunt. Murdoch and Hunt's Dictionary of Irish Law: A Sourcebook, 6th edn. Originally by Henry J. P. Murdoch. Haywards Heath, West Sussex: Bloomsbury Professional, 2016.

=== New Zealand ===
- Peter Spiller, ed. New Zealand Law Dictionary, 10th edn. Orig. by G.W. Hinde. Wellington: LexisNexis NZ, 2022.

=== South Africa ===
- R. D. Claassen & Cornalis Johannes Claassen. Dictionary of Legal Words and Phrases, 2nd edn. 4 vols. Durban: Butterworths, 1997 (reprints + updates LexisNexis South Africa).
- V.G. Hiemstra & H.L. Gonin. Drietalige regswoordeboek: Engels-Afrikaans, Latyn-Afrikaans-Engels, Afrikaans-Engels, 3rd edn. Lansdowne: Juta, 1992.
- J. Smuts & I.J. Smuts. Woordeboek van regs- en handelsterme: verklarend en vertalend. Cape Town: Nasou Beperk, 1992.

=== United States ===
- William S. Anderson, ed. Ballentine's Law Dictionary, with Pronunciations, 3rd edn. Orig. by James A. Ballentine. Rochester, N.Y.: Lawyers Co-operative Pub., 1969.
- Gerry W. Beyer, Pamela Anne Dallefeld, & Stephanie A. Williams. Modern Dictionary for the Legal Profession, 5th edn. Getzville, N.Y.: William S. Hein & Co., 2021.
- Bryan A. Garner, ed. Black's Law Dictionary, 11th edn. St. Paul, Minn.: West Group, 2019.
- Daniel Oran & Mark Tosti. Oran's Dictionary of the Law, 4th edn. Clifton Park, N.Y.: Thomson/Delmar Learning, 2008.
- Jonathan S. Lynton. Ballentine's Legal Dictionary and Thesaurus. Rochester, N.Y.: Lawyers Co-operative Pub., 1995.
- Merriam-Webster's Dictionary of Law. Springfield, Mass.: Merriam-Webster, 2016.
- Robert Sellers Smith & Adele Turgeon Smith. West's Tax Law Dictionary. 2024 edn. St. Paul, Minn.: Thomson West, 2023.
- Stephen Michael Sheppard. The Wolters Kluwer Bouvier Law Dictionary. Desk edn. 2 vols. NY: Wolters Kluwer Law & Business, 2012.
- Words and Phrases Judicially Defined. (Note: Distinct from Words and Phrases Legally Defined, whose first edition, although likewise entitled Words and Phrases Judicially Defined, was published well after this work. (See hyperlinked article and respective references.)) Publisher unknown. Pre-1905; at least five volumes. Cited in at least two Supreme Court opinions.

== See also ==
- Black's Law Dictionary
- Bouvier's Law Dictionary
- Encyclopedia
- Law Library Resource Xchange
- List of legal abbreviations
- Legal treatise
- Natural law
- Wex
