= Ultralingua =

Translation dictionary

- Developer: Ultralingua Inc.
- Stable release: 7.1.10 / July 2011
- Operating system: Windows, OS X
- Type: Translation
- License: Proprietary
- Website: www.ultralingua.com

Ultralingua is a single-click and drag-and-drop multilingual translation dictionary, thesaurus, and language reference utility. The full suite of Ultralingua language tools is available free online without the need for download and installation. As well as its online products, the developer offers premium downloadable language software with extended features and content for Macintosh and Windows computer platforms, smartphones, and other hand held devices.

== Features ==
In addition to the main user interface of the electronic dictionary, a ‘hotkey’ feature allows the user to click on a word in any program that uses editable text including web browsers and PDF documents, and source code. When a word is clicked, the translation or definition is displayed in a small pop-up window. The hotkey tool does not require previous launching of the software application. The word stemming function allows searches from inflected forms of a word into the root word, such as in French, (allez → aller) with further extension by lemmatisation. Full verb conjugation in all tenses, and number conversion from digits to text in the available languages (e.g. "123" → "one hundred twenty-three"), are available through the program interface, as well as free access to online examples of language in use, and a discussion forum moderated by linguists and lexicographers.

The search algorithms are tolerant of capitalisation, minor misspelling, and omitted accents and diacritics. Extensive lexical information is provided including irregular plurals, irregular verb forms, phrases and examples of use, American English and British English variations, and grammar references. IPA transcription is given, while several language modules are also enabled for text-to-speech. The application interface can be either permanently displayed above or alongside any other open program windows, or allowed to ‘float’ above open windows and is resizable.

An integrated learning tool provides a full screen flashcard feature that can work with the words in the language databases, and user-added definitions.

== History ==
The concept of the Ultralingua dictionary software began in 1996, when a small group of professors from Carleton College had the idea of creating a French dictionary that allowed the user to look up words on the fly with drag-and-drop technology, to and from a work in progress.

The dictionary program was first developed for the Apple Macintosh only. It was launched as freeware in 1997 under the name of Le Francophile and distributed mainly on the cover floppy discs of Mac magazines. It was commercialised in 1999, as shareware as a fully functional application that could be obtained online from download sites. By the year 2000, with the collaboration of additional specialists in lexicography and linguistics, the product range had expanded to include language modules for Spanish and German, and was released for Windows. A French-German module was added in 2002.

Concurrent with the opening of the Apple App Store in 2008, the language tools were launched for the iPhone. The major languages and features of the dictionary program have been offered free online since 2005 and take into account all the improvements of regular releases. By 2009 the software package was offering 17 dictionaries and additional language tools for widely spoken world languages.

Version 7.1.4 (Mac) and version 7.0.0.0 (Windows), released in the fall of 2008 and May 2009 respectively, incorporated a completely redesigned GUI and addressed many of the suggestions for improvement made in an exhaustive independent evaluation of version 6.0 by the State University of Texas (CALICO).

Though many people have been involved in the development of Ultralingua's code and data, the founders and main contributors to its development are the Chair Professors of Carleton's Linguistics and Computer Science departments. Elements of Ultralingua software have been developed in collaboration with Princeton University, and The Carnegie Mellon Pronouncing Dictionary, by Carnegie Mellon University. Additional code libraries used include contributions by CTGradient, ShortcutRecorder (BSD License), PTHotKey, Sparkle for application updates, and the hotkey code includes software licensed from TrufSoft.com.

== Available dictionaries ==
From its own in-house lexicographers the software provides proprietary bilingual dictionary modules for French-English, Spanish-English, German-English, Italian-English, Portuguese-English, Norwegian-English, French-Spanish, French-Italian, French-German, Spanish-German, Spanish-Portuguese, Esperanto-English, Latin-English, and English and French monolingual dictionaries and thesauri.

As well as its own language data sets, third-party modules include an English-French medical dictionary licensed from Masson, the French division of Elsevier, the world's largest publisher of medical and scientific literature, an English-Klingon dictionary developed in collaboration with the Klingon Language Institute and Simon & Schuster, and bilingual corpora developed in association with HarperCollins. The co-branded Dictionaries from Collins, Masson, and Simon & Schuster are for use exclusively with Ultralingua software.

The developer also has agreements with McGraw-Hill and Hachette for publication and distribution of print and CD-ROM versions of its dictionaries.

Other programs separately available that are based on the Ultralingua technology include Grammatica, a spell and grammar check utility, and Distinguo, an API for semantic search.

== Evaluation and Criticism (v 6.0) ==
It has been suggested in an independent evaluation by CALICO headquartered at the State University of Texas that the lexical content of the dictionaries tested with version 6.0 (2006) fell short on several issues: namely that the lack of systematic information on usage, regional variants, and examples in context diminished to a certain extent the value of these tools; and that entries needed to be organized into coherent and easily identifiable sections, with priority given to primary meanings between the language 1 and language 2. So, too, cultural and geographical entries included in the monolingual dictionaries needed to be expanded to cover all countries in which the language is spoken. The evaluation went on to state that despite their shortcomings, which decrease each time a new version is released, given the size of each of the dictionaries, the entries are reasonably comprehensible and offer useful information for language learners, particularly in the dictionaries with more complete databases.

== Platforms (current releases) ==
Mac OS X,10.3.+; Windows 2000, NT, XP, Vista, Windows 7; Windows Mobile; Palm OS; Pocket PC; Smartphone; iPhone; Symbian

== See also ==
- Centre for Lexicography
- Corpus linguistics
- DICT, the dictionary server protocol
- Encyclopedic dictionary
- Machine translation
- Lexicography
- Lexigraf
- Medical dictionary
- Monolingual learners' dictionaries
- Comparison of machine translation applications
