= Lexicology =

Linguistic discipline studying words

Lexicology is the branch of linguistics that concerns the words of a specific language. A word is the smallest meaningful unit of a language that can stand on its own. A word might have one or more small components called morphemes. Lexicology examines every feature of a word – including formation, spelling, origin, usage, and definition.

Lexicology also considers the relationships that exist between words. In linguistics, the lexicon of a language is composed of lexemes, which are abstract units of meaning that correspond to a set of related forms of a word. Lexicology looks at how words can be broken down and identifies common patterns in words.

Lexicology is associated with lexicography, which is the practice of compiling dictionaries.

== Etymology ==
The term lexicology derives from the Greek word λεξικόν lexicon (neuter of λεξικός lexikos, "of or for words", from λέξις lexis, "speech" or "word") and -λογία -logia, "the study of" (a suffix derived from λόγος logos, amongst others meaning "learning, reasoning, explanation, subject-matter").

Map of the etymology of the word apricot from Latin via Late and Byzantine Greek to Arabic, Spanish and Catalan, Middle French, and to English.

Etymology as a science is one of the foci of lexicology. Since lexicology studies the meaning of words and their semantic relations, it often explores the history and development of a word. Etymologists analyze related languages using the comparative method, which is a set of techniques that allow linguists to recover the ancestral phonological, morphological, syntactic, etc., components of modern languages by comparing their cognate material. This means many word roots from different branches of the Indo-European language family can be traced back to single words from the Proto-Indo-European language. The English language, for instance, contains more borrowed words (or loan words) in its vocabulary than native words. Examples include parkour from French, karaoke from Japanese, coconut from Portuguese, mango from Hindi, etc. A lot of music terminology, like piano, solo, and opera, is borrowed from Italian. These words can be further classified according to the linguistic element that is borrowed: phonemes, morphemes, and semantics.

== Approach ==
General lexicology is the broad study of words regardless of a language's specific properties. It is concerned with linguistic features that are common among all languages, such as phonemes and morphemes. Special lexicology, on the other hand, looks at what a particular language contributes to its vocabulary, such as grammars. Altogether lexicological studies can be approached two ways:

1. Diachronic or historical lexicology is devoted to the evolution of words and word-formation over time. It investigates the origins of a word and the ways in which its structure, meaning, and usage have since changed.
2. Synchronic or descriptive lexicology examines the words of a language within a certain time frame. This could be a period during the language's early stages of development, its current state, or any given interval in between.

These complementary perspectives were proposed by Swiss linguist Ferdinand de Saussure. Lexicology can have both comparative and contrastive methodologies. Comparative lexicology searches for similar features that are shared among two or more languages. Contrastive lexicology identifies the linguistic characteristics which distinguish between related and unrelated languages.

== Semantics ==
The subfield of semantics that pertains especially to lexicological work is called lexical semantics. In brief, lexical semantics contemplates the significance of words and their meanings through several lenses, including synonymy, antonymy, hyponymy, and polysemy, among others. Semantic analysis of lexical material may involve both the contextualization of the word(s) and syntactic ambiguity. Semasiology and onomasiology are relevant linguistic disciplines associated with lexical semantics.

A word can have two kinds of meaning: grammatical and lexical. Grammatical meaning refers to a word's function in a language, such as tense or plurality, which can be deduced from affixes. Lexical meaning is not limited to a single form of a word, but rather what the word denotes as a base word. For example, the verb to walk can become walks, walked, and walking – each word has a different grammatical meaning, but the same lexical meaning ("to move one's feet at a regular pace").

== Phraseology ==
Another focus of lexicology is phraseology, which studies multi-word expressions, or idioms, like 'raining cats and dogs.' The meaning of the phrase as a whole has a different meaning than each word does on its own and is often unpredictable when considering its components individually. Phraseology examines how and why such meanings exist, and analyzes the laws that govern these word combinations.

Idioms and other phraseological units can be classified according to content and/ or meaning. They are difficult to translate word-for-word from one language to another.

== Lexicography ==
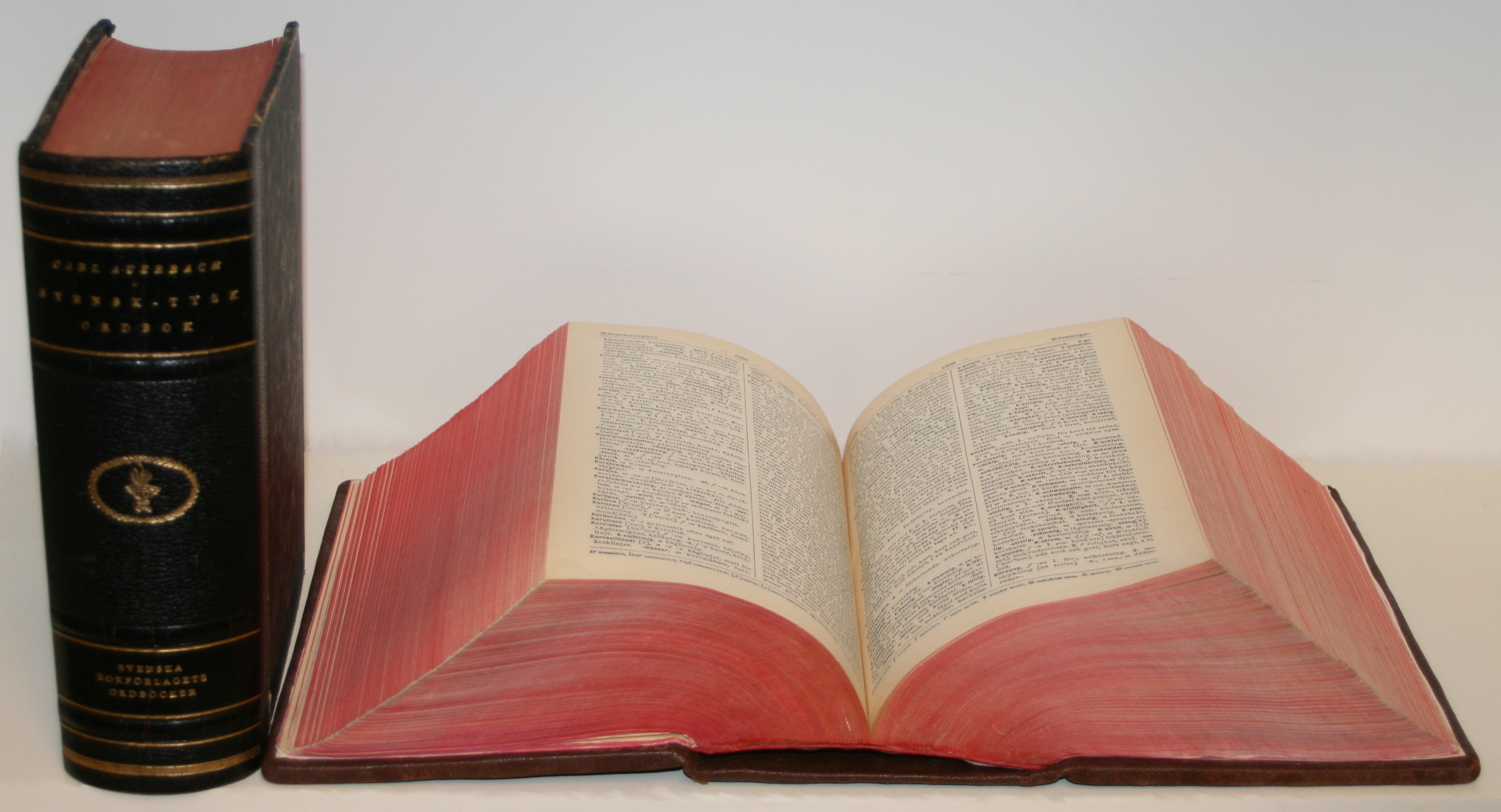

Lexicography is the study of lexicons and the art of compiling dictionaries. It is divided into two separate academic disciplines:

- Practical lexicography is the compiling, writing, and editing of dictionaries.
- Theoretical lexicography is the scholarly study of semantic, orthographic, syntagmatic, and paradigmatic features of lexemes of the lexicon (vocabulary) of a language, developing theories of dictionary components and structures linking the data in dictionaries, the needs for information by users in specific types of situations, and how users may best access the data incorporated in printed and electronic dictionaries. This is sometimes referred to as "metalexicography" as it is concerned with the finished dictionary itself.

There is some disagreement on the definition of lexicology, as distinct from lexicography. Some use "lexicology" as a synonym for theoretical lexicography; others use it to mean a branch of linguistics pertaining to the inventory of words in a particular language.

== Lexicologists ==
- Dámaso Alonso (October 22, 1898 - January 25, 1990): Spanish poet, literary critic, and philologist
- Roland Barthes (November 12, 1915 - March 25, 1980): French writer, critic, and semiotician
- Ghil'ad Zuckermann (born June 1, 1971): Israeli linguist and language revivalist

== See also ==
- Calque
- Computational lexicology
- Lexicostatistics
- Lexical semantics
- Lexical analysis
- English lexicology and lexicography
- List of lexicographers
- List of linguists
- Lexical Markup Framework
