= Nolfi =

Nolfi is a surname. Notable people with the surname include:

- Edward A. Nolfi (born 1958), American attorney, editor, teacher, and writer
- George Nolfi (born 1968), American screenwriter, producer, and director
- Stefano Nolfi (born 1963), Italian roboticist
