= Lexicography =

Art and science of compiling dictionaries

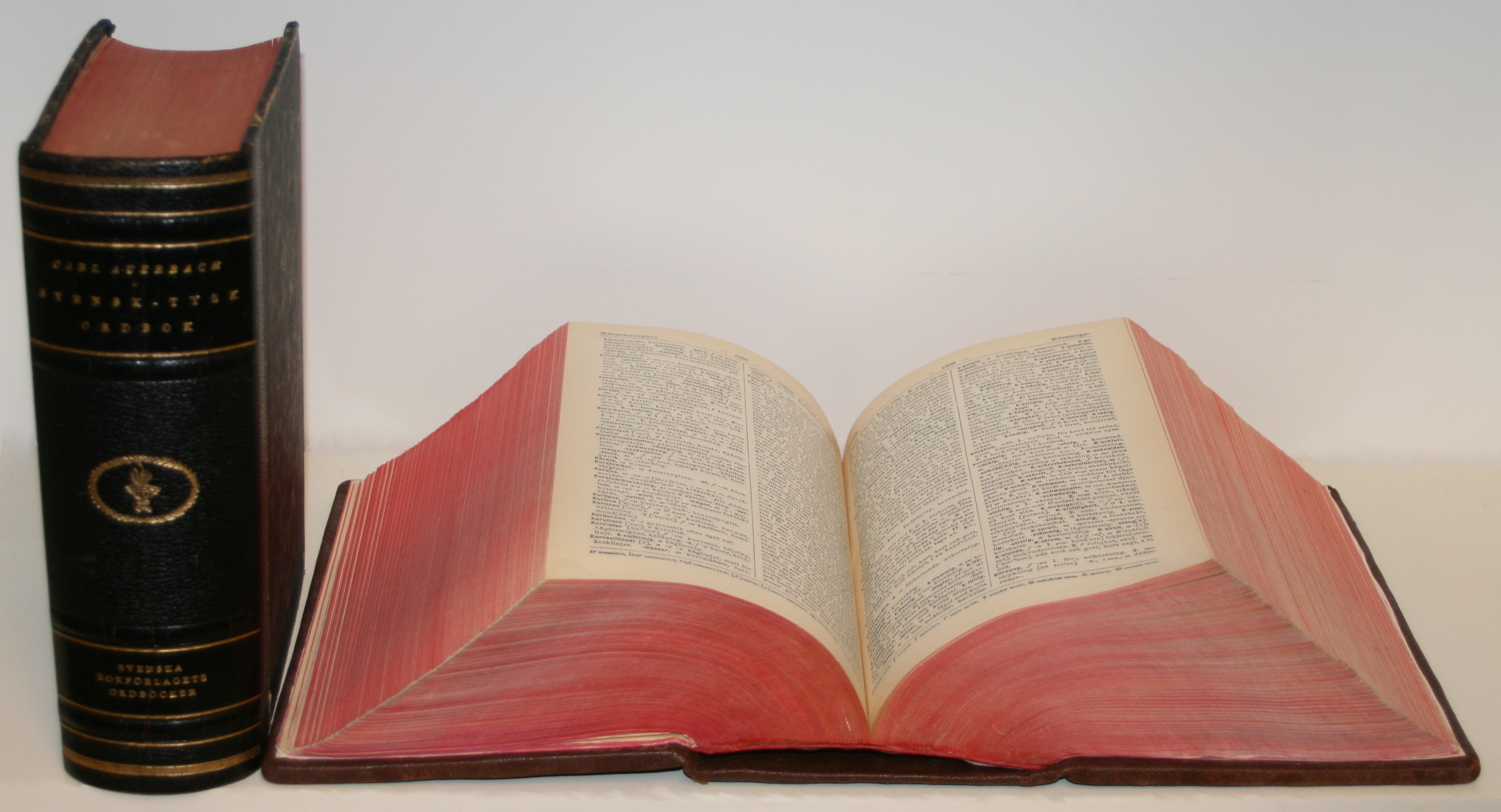

Lexicography is the study of lexicons and the art of compiling dictionaries. It is divided into two separate academic disciplines:

- Practical lexicography is the compiling, writing, and editing of dictionaries.
- Theoretical lexicography is the scholarly study of semantic, orthographic, syntagmatic, and paradigmatic features of lexemes of the lexicon (vocabulary) of a language, developing theories of dictionary components and structures linking the data in dictionaries, the needs for information by users in specific types of situations, and how users may best access the data incorporated in printed and electronic dictionaries. This is sometimes referred to as "metalexicography" as it is concerned with the finished dictionary itself.

There is some disagreement on the definition of lexicology, as distinct from lexicography. Some use "lexicology" as a synonym for theoretical lexicography; others use it to mean a branch of linguistics pertaining to the inventory of words in a particular language.

A person practicing lexicography is a lexicographer.

== Focus ==
Practical lexicography focuses on the design, compilation, use and evaluation of general dictionaries, i.e. dictionaries that provide a description of the language extant and in general use amongst members of a population. Specialized lexicography focuses on the design, compilation, use and evaluation of specialized dictionaries, i.e. dictionaries that are devoted to a (relatively restricted) set of linguistic and factual elements of one or more specialist subject fields, e.g. legal lexicography. Such a dictionary is usually called a specialized dictionary or Language for specific purposes dictionary; following Nielsen (1994), these are said to be either multi-field, single-field, or sub-field dictionaries.

It is now widely accepted that lexicography is a scholarly discipline in its own right and not a sub-branch of applied linguistics, as the chief object of study in lexicography is the dictionary (see e.g. Bergenholtz/Nielsen/Tarp 2009).

Lexicography is the practice of creating books, computer programs, or databases that reflect lexicographical work and are intended for public use. These include dictionaries and thesauri which are widely accessible resources that present various aspects of lexicology, such as spelling, pronunciation, and meaning.

Lexicographers are tasked with defining simple words as well as figuring out how compound or complex words or words with many meanings can be clearly explained. They also make decisions regarding which words should be kept, added, or removed from a dictionary. They are responsible for arranging lexical material (usually alphabetically, but also sometimes more thematically, or with the use of indexing and other physical arrangements) all so as to facilitate an audience's understanding of the content and efficient navigation through it.

== Etymology ==
Coined in English in the 1670s, the word "lexicography" derives from the Greek λεξικογράφος (lexikographos), "lexicographer", from λεξικόν (lexicon), neut. of λεξικός lexikos, "of or for words", from λέξις (lexis), "speech", "word" (in turn from λέγω (lego), "to say", "to speak") and γράφω (grapho), "to scratch, to inscribe, to write".

== Aspects ==
Practical lexicographic work involves several activities, and the compilation of well-crafted dictionaries requires careful consideration of all or some of the following aspects:

- profiling the intended users (i.e. linguistic and non-linguistic competences) and identifying their needs
- defining the communicative and cognitive functions of the dictionary
- selecting and organizing the components of the dictionary
- choosing the appropriate structures for presenting the data in the dictionary (i.e. frame structure, distribution structure, macro-structure, micro-structure and cross-reference structure)
- selecting words and affixes for systematization as entries
- selecting collocations, phrases and examples
- choosing lemma forms for each word or part of word to be lemmatized
- defining words
- organizing definitions
- specifying pronunciations of words
- labeling definitions and pronunciations for register and dialect, where appropriate
- selecting equivalents in bi- and multi-lingual dictionaries
- translating collocations, phrases and examples in bi- and multilingual dictionaries
- designing the best way in which users can access the data in printed and electronic dictionaries

One important goal of lexicography is to keep the lexicographic information costs incurred by dictionary users as low as possible. Nielsen (2008) suggests relevant aspects for lexicographers to consider when making dictionaries as they all affect the users' impression and actual use of specific dictionaries.

Theoretical lexicography concerns the same aspects as lexicography, but aims to develop principles that can improve the quality of future dictionaries, for instance in terms of access to data and lexicographic information costs. Several perspectives or branches of such academic dictionary research have been distinguished: 'dictionary criticism' or evaluating the quality of one or more dictionaries, e.g. by means of reviews (see Nielsen 1999), 'dictionary history' (or tracing the traditions of a type of dictionary or of lexicography in a particular country or language), 'dictionary typology' (or classifying the various genres of reference works, such as dictionary versus encyclopedia, monolingual versus bilingual dictionary, general versus technical or pedagogical dictionary), 'dictionary structure' (or formatting the various ways in which the information is presented in a dictionary), 'dictionary use' (or observing the reference acts and skills of dictionary users), and 'dictionary IT' (or applying computer aids to the process of dictionary compilation).

One important consideration is the status of 'bilingual lexicography', or the compilation and use of the bilingual dictionary in all its aspects (see e.g. Nielsen 1994). In spite of a relatively long history of this type of dictionary, it is often said to be less developed in a number of respects than its unilingual counterpart, especially in cases where one of the languages involved is not a major language. Not all genres of reference works are available in interlingual versions, e.g. LSP, learners' and encyclopedic types, although sometimes these challenges produce new subtypes, e.g. 'semi-bilingual' or 'bilingualised' dictionaries such as Hornby's (Oxford) Advanced Learner's Dictionary English-Chinese, which have been developed by translating existing monolingual dictionaries (see Marello 1998).

== History ==
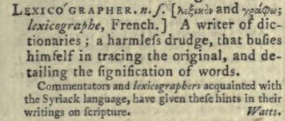
Definition of Lexicographer, from the 1785 6th edition of Samuel Johnson's A Dictionary of the English Language. He wryly calls the occupation (and thus himself) a "harmless drudge."

Traces of lexicography can be identified as early late 4th millennium BCE, with the first known examples being Sumerian cuneiform texts uncovered in the city of Uruk. Ancient lexicography usually consisted of word lists documenting a language's lexicon. Other early word lists have been discovered in Egyptian, Akkadian, Sanskrit, and Eblaite, and take the shape of mono- and bilingual word lists. They were organized in different ways including by subject and part of speech. The first extensive glosses, or word lists with accompanying definitions, began to appear around 300 BCE, and the discipline begins to develop more steadily. Lengthier glosses started to emerge in the literary cultures of antiquity, including Greece, Rome, China, India, Sasanian Persia, and the Middle East. In 636, Isidore of Seville published the first formal etymological compendium. The word dictionarium was first applied to this type of text by the late 14th century.

With the invention and spread of Gutenberg's printing press in the 15th century, lexicography flourished. Dictionaries became increasingly widespread, and their purpose shifted from a way to store lexical knowledge to a mode of disseminating lexical information. Modern lexicographical practices began taking shape during the 18th and 19th centuries, led by notable lexicographers such as Samuel Johnson, Vladimir Dal, the Brothers Grimm, Noah Webster, James Murray, Peter Mark Roget, Joseph Emerson Worcester, and others.

During the 20th century, the invention of computers changed lexicography again. With access to large databases, finding lexical evidence became significantly faster and easier. Corpus research also enables lexicographers to discriminate different senses of a word based on said evidence. Additionally, lexicographers were now able to work nonlinearly, rather than being bound to a traditional lexicographical ordering like alphabetical ordering.

In the early 21st century, the increasing ubiquity of artificial intelligence began to impact the field, which had traditionally been a time-consuming, detail-oriented task. The advent of AI has been hailed by some as the "end of lexicography". Others are skeptical that human lexicographers will be outmoded in a field studying the particularly human substance of language.

Regardless of how beneficial human lexicographers may be to lexicography, money to fund such positions has been drying up. The rise of the Internet since the 1990s has seen sharply declining printed paper dictionary sales. Many once formidable brands have stopped publishing new editions and simply began licensing out their last completed edition. During the 2000s and 2010s, ad revenue has helped sustain online versions of dictionaries, including Merriam-Webster and Dictionary.com, and these companies still employed lexicographers to stay up to date. However, changes in Google Search, the main source of incoming traffic, has seen traffic decline since 2016. As such, they too have largely laid off most of their staff working on this, with hobbyists, academics, and contractors continuing the work. Stefan Fatsis has estimated that the number of full-time commercial lexicographers in 2025 has dropped to less than a quarter of the amount in 2000.

== See also ==
- Dictionary
  - Bilingual dictionary
  - Monolingual learner's dictionary
  - Specialized dictionary (Picture dictionary, Multi-field dictionary, Single-field dictionary, Sub-field dictionary, LSP dictionary)
  - Glossary (defining dictionary, Core glossary)
- Linguistic description
- List of lexicographers
- Lexicology
- Lexicon
- Lexical definition
- Vocabulary
- Idioms Lexicon
- Specialised lexicography
- English lexicology and lexicography
- Terminology
- Dictionary Society of North America
- Dreaming of Words
