= Words and Phrases Legally Defined =

Dictionary of legal words and phrases

Words and Phrases Legally Defined is a law dictionary. It contains statutory and judicial definitions of words and phrases. It is one of the two "major" dictionaries of its type (the other being Stroud's). Both dictionaries have entries not contained in the other. McKie said this dictionary is "useful".

== Editions and supplements ==
The first edition was edited by Sir Roland Burrows and was published under the title Words and Phrases Judicially Defined in five volumes from 1943 to 1945.

The second edition was edited by John B. Saunders and published by Butterworths in five volumes from 1969 to 1970.

The third edition was published in four volumes from 1988 to 1990.

The fourth and fifth editions were edited by David Hay. The fourth edition was published in four volumes in 2007. The fifth edition was published in 2018.

There are annual supplements.

== Interpretation of Documents ==
Interpretation of Documents is a book by Sir Roland Burrows. The first edition was published in 1944 and is a reprint of the introduction to volume 1 of Words and Phrases Judicially Defined. The second edition was published in 1946. The Law Times said that the differences between the two editions are not substantial.
