= LEO (website) =

Internet-based electronic dictionary and translation dictionary

LEO GmbH
- Company type: GmbH
- Website type: Online dictionaries
- Available in: German (source language), English, French, Spanish, Italian, Chinese, Russian, Portuguese, Polish
- Founded: 3 April 2006
- Headquarters: Sauerlach, Germany
- Employees: 16
- Website: www.leo.org
- Advertising: Google AdSense, image banners and buttons
- Registration: optional
- Launched: 5 June 1994
- Current status: active

LEO (meaning Link Everything Online) is an Internet-based electronic dictionary and translation dictionary initiated by the computer science department of the Technical University of Munich in Germany. After a spin-out, the dictionaries have been run since 3 April 2006 by the limited liability company Leo GmbH, formed by the members of the original Leo team, and are partially funded by commercial advertising on the website. Its dictionaries can be consulted free online from any web browser or from LEO's Lion downloadable user interface (GUI), which is free since version 3.0 (released 13 January 2009), to private users only, and no longer sold as shareware. Corporate users and research institutions are however required to purchase a license.

== Dictionaries ==
The website hosts eight free German language based bilingual dictionaries and forums for additional language queries. The dictionaries are characterized by providing translations in forms of hyperlinks to further dictionary queries, thereby facilitating back translations. The dictionaries are partly added to and corrected by large vocabulary donations of individuals or companies, partly through suggestions and discussions on the LEO language forums.

For any of the eight foreign languages, there's at least one (in the cases of English and French two) qualified employee in charge (whose mother tongue is either German and who has studied the respective other idiom or vice versa). These employees oversee the above-mentioned donations and suggestions before integrating them in the dictionary. Thus, an entry can never be simply made by a registered user. These registered users, on the other hand, have the possibility to communicate in the eight different forums where native German speakers and the other native speakers collaborate alike, providing help with finding idiomatic equivalents for phrases or texts etc.

=== English–German ===
The English-German dictionary run by Leo since 1995 contains around 800,000 entries and receives an average of 11 million queries per weekday.

=== French–German ===
In 2004, a French–German dictionary was added to the site's services and has about 257,000 entries. This one gets about 2.6 million queries each weekday.

=== Spanish–German ===
A Spanish–German dictionary with about 208,000 entries was introduced on 3 April 2006. It gets about 2 million queries each weekday.

=== Italian–German ===
An Italian-German was started on 3 April 2008. At the time of the public launch, the dictionary contained about 140,000 entries and received 77,000 queries on the first day.

=== Chinese–German ===
The Chinese–German dictionary was started on the same date as the Italian–German dictionary, 3 April 2008. Queries can be entered by using Pinyin, or traditional or simplified characters. The dictionary started with about 65,000 entries and received about 93,000 queries on the first day. Today it contains about 195,000 entries and receives an average of 240,000 queries each weekday. Due to text encoding limitations, the Chinese dictionary cannot be used in the interface.

=== Russian–German ===
On 18 February 2009, LEO announced a forthcoming release of a German–Russian dictionary. The starter database has been provided in collaboration with ABBY Europe GmbH, the producers of the Lingvo dictionary brand.

The new dictionary became publicly available on 12 April 2010 after a couple of testing days. It started with 77,934 entries and received 38,800 queries on 13 April 2010. As the dictionary only went online in the evening it only received 3,607 queries on its first day.

Today it contains about 300,000 entries and receives an average of 370,000 queries each weekday.

=== Portuguese-German ===
A dictionary for the Portuguese language was announced in early 2011 and first launched in January 2013. As of September 2018, it contains more than 100,000 entries, receiving about 210,000 queries each weekday.

=== Polish-German ===
In 2013, a Polish-German dictionary was started which contains over 74,000 entries by November 2019 and receives almost 80,000 queries every weekday.

== History ==
The site grew out of a network of FTP software and archived data which was put together by students at the Technical University of Munich and LMU Munich even before HTML and HTTP existed. The original aim was to create a single, huge archive by linking up archives run by the different research groups (hence its name LEO – Link Everything Online). The archive was sorted thematically, and the different sections organised and kept up to date by archivists.

When the World Wide Web came into common use, HTTP access to the archive was at first added as an alternative to FTP. Students developed various services in their free time, in particular the dictionaries. Some services have been dropped in the course of the spin out.

== Name ==
The name of the site is actually a backronym from the name Leo: the Bavarian coat of arms features a lion. Originally, the service was named ISAR (a backronym for Isar river, on the banks of which Munich is situated; here, ISAR stood for Informations Systeme und Archiv München, but it had to be renamed as there was another firm of the same name.
