= Idiom dictionary =

Dictionary or phrase book that lists and explains idioms

A page from Brewer's Dictionary of Phrase and Fable contains many idioms such as "keep your hair on!".

An idiom dictionary is a dictionary or phrase book that lists and explains idioms – distinctive words or phrases having a figurative meaning that goes beyond the original semantics of the words.

== Idioms ==
An idiom is a phrase whose meaning could not be readily deduced from the meaning of its individual words. The word comes from the Greek ἰδίωμα (idioma) – the distinctive style of a particular person. The traditional example is "kick the bucket" which is normally understood to mean dying. The extent to which a phrase is thought idiomatic is a matter of degree and native speakers of English consider a phrase like "pop the question" (proposing marriage) to be less idiomatic than "kick the bucket".

== Dictionary ==
An idiom dictionary may be a traditional book or expressed in another medium such as a database within software for machine translation. Examples of the genre include Brewer's Dictionary of Phrase and Fable, which explains traditional allusions and proverbs, and Fowler's Modern English Usage, which was conceived as an idiom dictionary following the completion of the Concise Oxford English Dictionary, which itself contained many idioms.

Some multilingual dictionaries of idioms are available on-line. One of them is Babelite which is freely accessible.

The main readership and market for idiom dictionaries are deaf people and learners of English as a foreign language (EFL). The first major dictionary of idioms in American English was A Dictionary of Idioms for the Deaf; published in 1966 by the American School for the Deaf. Subsequent editions were published under the more general title of A Dictionary of American Idioms.

== Structure ==
Idioms may vary considerably in their presentation. The keywords may vary – "green fingers" or a "green thumb". The grammar may vary – "turn the tables" or "the tables are turned". A phrase may even be recast completely, just following a pattern – "a few gallons shy of a full tank" or "one sandwich short of a picnic". This variation makes organisation of an idiom dictionary difficult. The idioms may be organised in simple alphabetical order, as in The Oxford Dictionary of Current Idiomatic English. They may be grouped by keyword, as in the Longman Dictionary of English Idioms. Or they may be grouped by domain so that, for example, all idioms based upon nautical expressions such as "show him the ropes" and "three sheets to the wind" are put together.

== Bilingual dictionaries ==
Bilingual dictionaries have an additional problem when dealing with idioms – as well as explaining the idiom, they also have to translate it. In doing so, they will commonly provide both a literal translation and a free translation. For example, the phrase "can be counted on the fingers of one hand", meaning few in number, may translated literally into Chinese as qu zhe ke shu and, more sensibly, as liao liao wu ji (only a handful).

== See also ==
- Glossary of nautical terms (A-L)
- Glossary of nautical terms (M-Z)
- Slang dictionary
