= Roland Burrows =

British judge and legal writer (1882–1952)

Sir Roland Burrows KC (12 February 1882 – 13 June 1952) was an English judge and legal writer.

Burrows was born in Maidstone, Kent, and educated at St John's College, Southend; the University of London, and Trinity Hall, Cambridge. He was called to the bar by the Inner Temple in January 1904, was appointed King's Counsel in 1932, and became a bencher of the Inner Temple in 1940. He was Recorder of Chichester from 1926 to 1928, and again in 1951. He was Recorder of Cambridge from 1928 onward. He was the managing editor of the second edition of Halsbury's Laws of England. He was knighted in the 1946 New Year Honours.

== Works ==
He was editor of the first edition of what was then called Words and Phrases Judicially Defined (1943 to 1945). He was the author of Interpretation of Documents (first edition, 1943; second edition, 1946).

He was the editor in chief of the second edition of Halsbury's Statutes of England.

Burrows was the editor of the seventh and eighth editions of Phipson's The Law of Evidence and the ninth edition called Phipson on the Law of Evidence, published in 1930, 1942 and 1952. Burrows was the editor of the fifth, sixth and seventh editions of the abridgement Phipson's Manual of the Law of Evidence for the Use of Students, published in 1935, 1943 and 1950.

Burrows was joint author, with C M Cahn, of The Evidence Act, 1938 (1938).
