= Multitran =

Russian and English online dictionary

- Developer(s): Andrey Pominov
- Stable release: 3.44 / ?
- Preview release: ? / 22 April 2008
- Written in: C++
- Operating system: Cross-platform
- Available in: Russian/English shell
- Type: Dictionary
- License: Proprietary; fair use; others
- Website: http://www.multitran.com/

Multitran is an editable Russian multilingual online dictionary launched on 1 April 2001. The English–Russian–English dictionary contains over four million entries, while the total database has about eight million entries. The dictionary has a function for reporting translation errors for registered users.

== Features ==
- Multitran's database contains over 10 million terms.
- Every registered user is technically allowed to expand the dictionaries online (over 1000 translators are active contributors).
- Alphabetical, morphological, word-combination search.
- Simultaneous search in the dictionaries, forums, and in the database of English and Russian parallel sentences.
- Every user of Multitran can ask a question concerning translation on the Multitran forums.

=== Languages ===
Multitran includes the following online dictionaries:

- English–Russian and Russian–English
- German–Russian and Russian–German
- Spanish–Russian and Russian–Spanish
- French–Russian and Russian–French
- Dutch–Russian and Russian–Dutch
- Italian–Russian and Russian–Italian
- Latvian–Russian and Russian–Latvian
- Estonian–Russian and Russian–Estonian
- Japanese–Russian and Russian–Japanese
- Afrikaans–Russian and Russian–Afrikaans
- English–German and German–English
- English–Japanese and Japanese–English

The following dictionaries are to be offered soon:

- Azerbaijani–Russian and Russian–Azerbaijani
- Norwegian–Russian and Russian–Norwegian
- Turkish–Russian and Russian–Turkish
- Ukrainian–Russian and Russian–Ukrainian

== History ==
The developer of the Multitran software is Andrey Pominov, Moscow. Currently, Multitran is one of the largest and most popular web dictionaries in Russia. Every day, over 90 thousand people visit Multitran.ru, and over 1.5 million search requests are processed.

The Multitran base was created by scanning a wealth of paper dictionaries and combining all the translations in one database.

The website historically had a very low budget: according to Multitran's history page, a CPU paid only one dollar served over 4 million hits, and the site had issues with networking and electricity works around the webmaster's house in 2001 and 2002, as well as with growing traffic in 2002–03.

Multitran users arrange offline meetings from time to time, the so called pow-wows. Such pow-wows were held in Moscow, St. Petersburg and Kyiv.

In May 2019 the Multitran's website was redesigned, with a gradual transfer of all user-generated data to the new website.

In early June 2023 the website announced that its server has been transferred to Finland.

== Copyright ==
The Multitran software is proprietary and closed-source.

The website content was copied from hundreds copyrighted sources, the majority of which were published after 1970. It's not known how this can respect copyright laws: the website doesn't state whether a license was acquired from the copyright owners, nor whether the sources were determined to be in the public domain.

Contributions by users are in unknown copyright status.

== Advantages and disadvantages of Multitran ==
The huge volume of the base is both an advantage and a disadvantage because:

- Multitran may offer well over 100 translations for a word, which complicates the task of choosing the right equivalent for beginning language learners, though it comes very handy for language professionals.
- Search results often give duplicate translations of a term for various disciplines.
- Multitran may give very narrow meanings of a term, suitable only for very limited contexts.
- Multitran has a feature enabling users to check the equivalent translations, but checking each and every term may require dozens of man-years of work. Every registered user can issue a warning about identified mistakes, so until a mistake is corrected, it remains marked accordingly. Multitran users have reported about 8000 mistakes using this functionality, and most of them have been corrected. Thus, users not only add their own terms (added by users are more than 180 thousand words and phrases), but also help to clean the database from mistakes.
- The feature allowing every registered user to contribute is an advantage, but it also carries the risk that mistranslations are added to the database, because they are added arbitrarily by Multitran users and depend on the level of the contributing individual user's knowledge, which may not be up to the mark.

== See also ==
- LexSite, an online English-Russian dictionary
