= Yeminli Sözlük =

Sentence-based online dictionary

Yeminli Sözlük is a sentence-based online dictionary with millions of pre-translated English–Turkish sentences.

Started in early 2008, Yeminli Sözlük contains nearly 1,000,000 entries made up of translated sentences in English and Turkish languages. Developed and supported by Turkish sworn translators, Yeminli Sözlük is a primary source for learners of English and translators.

Yeminli Sözlük is currently the only website that contains millions of translated sentences in two languages: Turkish and English. Yeminli Sözlük claims to be the future of online dictionarying. Yeminli Sözlük may be referred to as the human-translation version of Example-based machine translation.

== History ==
Yeminli Sözlük was generated by Abdullah Erol, an English-Turkish translator with 10 years experience in the translation industry both as a translator and a networkist.

The dictionary is one of the online dictionaries available for the translation community and teachers of English in Turkey.
