= Language for specific purposes =

Language for specific purposes (LSP) has been primarily used to refer to two areas within applied linguistics:

1. One focusing on the needs in education and training
2. One with a focus on research on language variation across a particular subject field

LSP can be used with any target language needed by the learners as a tool for specific purposes, and has often been applied to English (English for specific purposes, or ESP).

A third approach, content or theme-based language instruction (CBI) has also been confused with LSP. These several uses of the label of LSP have caused some confusion internationally.

== Education and training ==
LSP is a widely applied approach to second or foreign language teaching and training that addresses immediate and very specific needs of learners who need that language as a tool in their education, training or job. Needs analysis is the underlying "driver" for the development of LSP programs. For example, English native speaking nurses who work in hospitals with a high percentage patient whose native language is Spanish might have to study Spanish for the very specific purpose of communication between nurses and patients. Students are encouraged to take active roles in their own learning and question what they have been taught. This is likened to negotiated syllabus about which Hyland (2009) writes, "A negotiated syllabus means that the content of a particular course is a matter of discussion between teacher and students, according to the wishes and needs of the learners in conjunction with the expertise, judgement, and advice of the teacher" (p. 208).

== Research ==
"Language for specific purposes" has also been used to refer to a branch of applied linguistics which deals with a variety of language used by members of a particular subject field, concentrating on its genres, stylistic features and technical lexis. This research is relevant for such problem-based areas as language education, translation and the design of specialised dictionaries. Some in the training area consider such research on Professional Communications as LSP-related research when it is paired with or applied directly to an LSP training program.

== Relationship to content-based instruction ==
Content-based language instruction (CBI) is also sometimes confused with ESP. At the post-secondary level it is frequently used to motivate groups of learners who may be interested in the same professional field, providing meaningful communication opportunities. However, as in their regular studies they are usually not studying through a foreign/second language (except for sheltered courses), they do not need English as a tool in their immediate studies. "Content-based instruction (CBI) is the integration of selected content with language teaching aims". Thus, when trying to identify which approach being taken, the question is: "Is it English for Specific Purposes or English through specific content themes or content areas?"

== See also ==
- Controlled vocabulary
- Domain-specific language
- Language for specific purposes dictionary
