= Legal terminology textbook =

Book compiling legal definitions

A legal terminology textbook is a textbook that arranges and defines legal words and phrases in groups and by topic, in contrast with a law dictionary, which arranges and defines legal words and phrases individually and in alphabetical order. Thus, it may be more suitable for a student or other person interested in understanding an array of related legal words and phrases.

Such books published in the United States include the following:

== Comprehensive legal terminology textbooks ==
- Legal Terminology Explained ISBN 0073511846 – in 57 narrative chapters arranged according to a comprehensive outline (Chapter 1, p. 8.), Edward A. Nolfi defines more than 6,000 legal words and phrases. Published as part of the McGraw-Hill Paralegal series.

== Selective legal terminology textbooks ==
- Legal Terminology ISBN 0131568043 – in 42 chapters, Gordon W. Brown defines more than 1,500 legal words and phrases.
- Legal Terminology With Flashcards ISBN 1418039802 – in 19 chapters, Cathy J. Okrent defines more than 1,900 legal words and phrases.
- Legal Studies: Terminology and Transcription ISBN 0538437227 – in 32 chapters, Wanda Roderick-Bolton defines terms "selected from books on legal secretarial training, law books, legal dictionaries, legal documents, and court transcripts" (Preface, p. v.).
