= Language-for-specific-purposes dictionary =

Dictionary that defines a subject-specific vocabulary of words from one or more languages

A language-for-specific-purposes dictionary (LSP dictionary) is a reference work which defines the specialised vocabulary used by experts within a particular field, for example, architecture. The discipline that deals with these dictionaries is specialised lexicography. Medical dictionaries are well-known examples of the type.

== Users ==
As described in Bergenholtz/Tarp 1995, LSP dictionaries are often made for users who are already specialists with a subject field (experts), but may also be made for semi-experts and laypeople. In contrast to LSP dictionaries, LGP (language for general purposes) dictionaries are made to be used by an average user. LSP dictionaries may have one or more functions. LSP dictionaries may have communicative functions, such as helping users to understand, translate and produce texts. Dictionaries may also have cognitive functions such as helping users to develop knowledge in general or about a specific topic, such as the birthday of a famous person and the inflectional paradigm of a specific verb.

== Different types ==
According to Sandro Nielsen, LSP dictionaries may cover one language (monolingual) or two languages (bilingual), and occasionally more (multilingual). An LSP dictionary that attempts to cover as much of the vocabulary in a subject field as possible is classified by Nielsen as a maximizing dictionary, and one that attempts to cover a limited number of terms within a subject field is a minimizing dictionary.

Also, Nielsen 1994 distinguishes between the following types of dictionaries: An LSP dictionary that covers more than one subject field is called a multi-field dictionary, an LSP dictionary that covers one subject field (e.g. a dictionary of law) is called a single-field dictionary, and an LSP dictionary that covers part of a subject field (e.g. a dictionary of contract law) is called a sub-field dictionary.

=== Usage dictionaries ===
A common form of LSP dictionary is a usage dictionary for a particular field or genre, such as journalism, providing advice on words and phrases to prefer, and distinctions between easily confused usages. Probably the best known of these for news style writing is the AP Stylebook. Many such works also have elements of a style guide, though most of the latter are not in dictionary format, but arranged as a series of rules in sections, and more concerned with grammar and punctuation. Some usage dictionaries are intended for a general rather than specialized audience, and are therefore more comprehensive; two major ones are Fowler's Dictionary of Modern English Usage and Garner's Modern English Usage.

== See also ==
- Language for specific purposes
