= Legal lexicography =

Study and practice of writing legal dictionaries

Legal lexicography is the study and practice of writing lexicographical works in law, such as law dictionaries, encyclopedias, and glossaries.

== Sources ==
- Barenot, Pierre-Nicolas (2014). "A View of French Legal Lexicography – Tradition and Change from a Doctrinal Genre to the Modern Era". In Mac Aodha, Mairtin (ed.). Legal Lexicography: A Comparative Perspective. Law, Language and Communication. Farnham, Surrey, UK: Ashgate Publishing. pp. 11–30. ISBN 978-1-4724-0719-1.
- Nielsen, Sandro (2023). "Legal lexicography and legal information tools". In Biel, Łucja; Kockaert, Hendrik J. (eds.). Handbook of Terminology: Legal Terminology. Vol. 3. Amsterdam: John Benjamins Publishing Company. pp. 432–457. doi:10.1075/hot.3.leg4. ISBN 978-90-272-1426-3. Archived from the original on September 13, 2025.

== See also ==
- Legal writing
