= Frederick Stroud =

English barrister, author of the Judicial Dictionary (1835–1912)

Frederick Stroud (1835–1912), barrister and Recorder of Tewkesbury, son of John Stroud of Cheltenham, was born at Cheltenham on 17 October 1835. He was educated at Cheltenham. He was admitted a solicitor in 1863, taking honours at the examination. He was called to the Bar at Lincoln's Inn in Michaelmas 1883. In 1862, he wrote his County Court Practice in Bankruptcy. From 1862 to 1863, he wrote his Practical Law Affecting Bills of Sale. He is the author of the "Judicial Dictionary", the first edition of which was published in 1890, the second being published in three volumes, an exhaustive and eminently practical dictionary of the English of affairs by the English Judges and Parliament from the earliest times to the end of the nineteenth century. After Stroud's death, the Law Journal said that the dictionary would long preserve his memory. It was at Stroud's suggestion that the policy of municipalities for the government of London was adopted. Stroud was a member of the British Numismatic Society.
