= Student Intellectual Property Law Association =

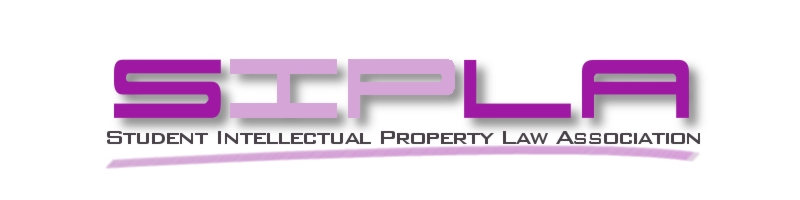
- Abbreviation: SIPLA
- Type: Legal society

The Student Intellectual Property Law Association (SIPLA) is an American voluntary association for law students interested in intellectual property (IP) law. SIPLA chapters typically organize at law schools with an intellectual property curriculum. There is no national SIPLA body, and independent student chapters have formed to organize intellectual property-related events and provide law students networking and learning opportunities.

== Typical SIPLA objectives ==
- Promote intellectual property issues across the law student community, to the state bar, and other audiences;
- Expose members to the many facets of intellectual property, including patents, trademarks, and copyrights;
- Provide a forum for open dialogue about current issues in intellectual property and how they might affect the future practice of intellectual property law; and
- Promote rapport and engagement between intellectual property students and professionals.

== SIPLA events ==
SIPLA chapters organize networking and speaking events featuring influential IP professionals.

== Active SIPLA chapters ==
- California Western School of Law
- Case Western Reserve University School of Law
- California Western School of Law
- Cleveland-Marshall College of Law
- Franklin Pierce Law Center, Pierce Chapter Blog
- George Washington University Law School
- J. Reuben Clark Law School
- University of Nebraska College of Law
- Santa Clara University School of Law
- S.J. Quinney College of Law
- St. Louis University School of Law
- The University of Tennessee College of Law
- Thomas M. Cooley Law School
- University of Minnesota Law School
- University of Pittsburgh School of Law
- University of St. Thomas School of Law
- William Mitchell College of Law
- University of New Hampshire Franklin Pierce School of Law
