= Stroud's Judicial Dictionary =

British law dictionary

Stroud's Judicial Dictionary is a law dictionary. The First Edition by Frederick Stroud was published in 1890. The Second Edition was by the same author and was published in 1903. A supplement by the same author was published in 1906. A supplement by Elsie Wheeler was published in 1930. A supplement by John Burke was published in 1947. The Third Edition was published between 1951 and 1953 under the General Editorship of J Burke and P Allsop. The First Supplement to that edition was published in 1956. The Second Cumulative Supplement by L Leowe and Charles Moss was published in 1965. The Fourth Edition by John S James was published between 1971 and 1974. The First Supplement to that edition was by the same author and was published in 1979.

Glanville Williams called it an "excellent work".

Katherine Topulos said that the seventh edition is one of "the leading modern English legal dictionaries".

Each edition contains the dedication,

"To the Cherished Memory of H.S., Friend and Wife, Ever and in all things, full of wise counsel and steadfast courage, Who took an affectionate interest in this enterprise, But whose too early death has taken away its charm, This Book is reverently and lovingly Dedicated. by F Stroud, Easter, 1890"

Editions since the 6th Edition have been edited by Daniel Greenberg, who presently serves as Counsel for Domestic Legislation in the House of Commons. The latest edition is the 9th Edition published in 2016, and annual cumulative supplements are also published.
