= Edward A. Nolfi =

Edward Anthony Nolfi (born September 30, 1958, in Warren, Ohio) is an American attorney, editor, teacher, and writer, and the author of numerous legal textbooks published by McGraw-Hill, including the first (and only) comprehensive legal terminology textbook published in the United States, Legal Terminology Explained (2009).

Nolfi is a bachelor's degree, liberal arts graduate of Brown University and a doctorate degree, law graduate of The University of Akron. Admitted to the bar in Ohio, New York, and United States federal courts including the United States Supreme Court, he has been an attorney since 1983. From 1985 to 1987, he was an American Law Reports (ALR) editor with The Lawyers Co-operative Publishing Company. From 1999 to 2006, he was a lead case law editor, product developer, and project manager with LexisNexis. Since 1988, he has taught legal, business, criminal justice, and general education courses at the Academy of Court Reporting (1988–1991), Kent State University (1993), Mount Aloysius College (1996), Remington College (2006–2008), and Butler County Community College (Pennsylvania) (2010).

== Publications ==
- Legal Terminology Explained (2009) ISBN 0073511846, the first (and only) comprehensive legal terminology textbook published in the United States
- Basic Legal Research for Paralegals (2008) ISBN 0073520519
- Basic Wills, Trusts, and Estates (1995) ISBN 0028013387
- Ohio Supplement to Accompany Basic Civil Litigation (1993) ISBN 0028012836
- Basic Legal Research and Writing (1993) ISBN 0028012763 (co-author)
- Basic Legal Research (1993) ISBN 0028002865, the first formal legal research textbook for paralegals published in the United States
- "Extensions of time under Sec. 108(b) of the Bankruptcy Code (11 USCS Sec. 108(b))," 96 A.L.R. Fed 699 (1990) (co-author)
- "State or local regulation of toxic substances as preempted by Toxic Substances Control Act (15 USCS Sec. 2601 et seq.)," 84 A.L.R. Fed 913 (1987)
- "When are persons other than owners, directors, officers, and employees potentially liable for penalties under IRC Sec. 6672 (26 USCS Sec. 6672), concerning failure to collect and pay over tax," 84 A.L.R. Fed 170 (1987)
- "Copyrightability of sculptural works," 83 A.L.R. Fed 845 (1987)
- "Home office tax deductions under 26 USCS Sec. 280A," 83 A.L.R. Fed 691 (1987)
- "Extensions of time under Sec. 108(c) of the Bankruptcy Code (11 USCS Sec. 108(c))," 83 A.L.R. Fed 528 (1987)
- "Standing to sue for copyright infringement under 17 USCS Sec. 501(b)," 82 A.L.R. Fed 509 (1987)
- "Extensions of time under Sec. 108(a) of the Bankruptcy Code (11 USCS Sec. 108(a))," 80 A.L.R. Fed 374 (1986)
- "Employee training time as exempt from minimum wage and overtime requirements of Fair Labor Standards Act," 80 A.L.R. Fed 246 (1986)
- "State or local regulation of transportation of hazardous materials as pre-empted by Hazardous Materials Transportation Act (49 USCS Sec. 1801 et seq.)," 78 A.L.R. Fed 289 (1986)
