= English lexicology and lexicography =

English lexicology and lexicography is that field in English language studies which examines English lexicon, English word-formation, the evolution of vocabulary and the composition of English dictionaries.
