= Lexigraf =

Greek lexicographical project

Lexigraf is a multilingual lexicographical project developed at the Aristotle University Thessaloniki Greece between 1997 and 2004.

Current lexicographical projects require sophisticated IT infrastructure to be completed - both in hardware capacity and software. Lexicography software needs to function as a compound desktop publishing engine, a terminology database management system and an electronic dictionary generation engine.

Following these guidelines, Lexigraf was developed at the Aristotle University in Thessaloniki, Greece, supporting a multilingual science lexicography project and several branch ones. Terminology databases formed, were also used in e-publishing efforts. Branch projects included bilingual dictionaries and machine translation memory databases.
