= Lexicographic information cost =

Concept in lexicography

Lexicographic information cost is a concept in the field of lexicography. The term refers to the difficulties and inconveniences that the user of a dictionary believes or feels are associated with consulting a particular dictionary or dictionary article. For example, the extensive use of abbreviations in articles in order to save space may annoy the user, because it is often difficult to read such condensed texts and understand the abbreviations, thereby increasing the lexicographic information costs.

The important point in connection with lexicographic information costs is the relation between the information costs anticipated by the user and the information value the user expects to gain from consulting a dictionary or dictionary article. The more easily a user can navigate a dictionary and its articles, the lower the information costs and, hopefully, the more content with the dictionary the user will be. The higher the information costs of a dictionary, the more dissatisfied the user will be. There are two general types of lexicographic information costs:

1. the search costs are the efforts required by users when searching for something in dictionaries, i.e., the look-up activities required to find what they are looking for; and
2. the comprehension costs, which are the efforts required by users to understand and interpret the data in dictionaries.

The concept of lexicographic information costs was first proposed by the Danish scholar and metalexicographer Sandro Nielsen (see below). The concept is relevant to lexicographers when planning and compiling a dictionary; for the users when consulting the dictionary; and for reviewers when evaluating a dictionary.

== See also ==
- Chartjunk
- Wikipedia:Too long; didn't read
