= Law and Business Review of the Americas =

- Discipline: Law
- Language: English

Publication details
- Former names: NAFTA: Law and Business Review of the Americas
- History: 1995–2016
- Publisher: Dedman School of Law (United States)
- Frequency: Quarterly

Standard abbreviations
- Bluebook: Law & Bus. Rev. Am.
- ISO 4: Law Bus. Rev. Am.

Indexing
- ISSN: 1571-9537

Links
- Journal homepage

The Law and Business Review of the Americas (formerly NAFTA: Law and Business Review of the Americas) is an interdisciplinary law review.

The journal focuses on the legal, business, economic, political, and social dimensions of economic integration in the Americas, such as the North American Free Trade Agreement (NAFTA), Free Trade Area of the Americas (FTAA), and Mercosur. Articles in the journal deal with economic integration's implementation, evolution, expansion, and overall impact on doing business in the Western Hemisphere. Subject matter concerning regional integration efforts in other parts of the world and various other comparative topics in the international trade and investment areas are also addressed from time to time. Topics of particular concern to the journal include free trade, foreign direct investment, licensing, finance, taxation, litigation and dispute resolution and organizational aspects of integration efforts.

The journal publishes quarterly and is co-sponsored by the American Bar Association Section of International Law and Practice, Southern Methodist University's Dedman School of Law (and its Law Institute of the Americas), Cox School of Business, Department of Economics, and Department of Political Science, and the Centre for Commercial Law Studies at Queen Mary University of London. The journal is student-edited.
