= LexSite =

LexSite is a comprehensive English-Russian / Russian-English dictionary developed primarily for translators, teachers, researchers and students.

== Functionality ==
Created to facilitate cross-cultural communications, the dictionary contains more than 1.4 million lexical-semantic units. Its search engine captures morphological specifics of the English and Russian languages, thus reducing ambiguities and improving the speed and quality of translations in the English-Russian language pair.

For educational purposes, LexSite Dictionary is a part of the Resonance Study Guide, where, along with Resonance dictionaries and Personal Dictionaries it forms a versatile system for vocabulary acquisition and enhancement.

In addition to commonly used words and expressions, LexSite contains a unique terminology base. It includes terminology related to science and technology, as well as project-specific terminology used in international projects. These terms were collected by the Language Interface team while working with organizations such as United Nations, Lokheed-Martin, Worley-Parsons, NASA, Orbital, Fluor Daniel, McKinsey, Sberbank, Tengizchevroil, Schlumberger and other global brands.

LexSite platform is developed and managed by Language Interface, a language engineering company that supported dual-language communications for international projects for more than 20 years. The first edition of LexSite Dictionary debuted online in 2009 and has since undergone upgrades and enhancements.

Experience of the Language Interface team in English-Russian and Russian-English translation enabled the developers to identify specific problems faced by translators when working with this language pair and develop a tool to guide them in selecting words or phrases that offer the best possible fit for a given context.

== Advantages and disadvantages ==
LexSite is focused on a single language pair; while this may not be sufficient for tasks where a content needs to be translated into multiple languages, this narrow focus enables developers and linguists to achieve results in translation and language engineering that would not be possible otherwise.

== See also ==
- Bilingual dictionary
- Multitran, a collaborative dictionary including English-Russian
- Translation memory
