= Logos Dictionary =

Multilingual online dictionary

Logos Dictionary is a multilingual online dictionary provided by Logos Group, a European translation company. It was founded in 1995 by Rodrigo Vergara, and was one of the first and largest multilingual dictionaries on the web. In 1996, it was made freely accessible on the Web, and had over a thousand translators contributing to over a million entries. At the time, it was described by translator Robert Clark as the fastest growing dictionary. As of 2005 it contained over seven million terms in over 200 languages, some of them minority languages as Breton, Leonese, Scots or Venetian.

The dictionary offers a variety of search options, and requires free registration in order to add or update translations. It includes a multilingual portal for using the dictionary, a Linguistic Resources database of over 500 glossaries, a Universal Conjugator database for conjugation of verbs, and a children's dictionary with multilingual usage examples.

== See also ==
- Endangered languages
