= Sindhi to English dictionaries =

Sindhi to English dictionaries are bilingual dictionaries which provide English equivalents of Sindhi language words.

Compilations of Sindhi and English terms were created for non-Sindhi speaking students in the early 1800s. The Journal of the Asiatic Society of Bengal, Calcutta published articles with vocabulary lists in 1836 and 1843. Sindhi was one of the languages included in Leech's 1943 vocabularies of Indic languages for the British government. In 1849, George Stack published a Sindhi to English dictionary consisting of 15,000 terms, followed in 1855 by an English to Sindhi dictionary with 17000 terms, in which he used the Devanagari script. Father G. Shirt published a Sindhi to English dictionary in 1879 in which he used Arabic script and which became the basis for a number of other versions, including Parmanand Mewarm's 1910 and 1933 works. Beginning in the 1960s, Deccan College began work on a dictionary with both Devanagari and Arabic characters which included contemporary usage and cross references. Sirajul Haque Memon was the chief editor of the Oxford English-Sindhi Dictionary.

In addition to standard dictionaries, concise dictionaries have been compiled by Shahani.

Yadgar Sindhi to English Dictionary is a reference work edited by A. D. Shah and Zulfiqar Ali Bhatti and published by Yadgar Publishers.It is a bilingual dictionary and contains over 8000 English meanings of Sindhi words.

Electronic dictionaries and software that converts Sindhi into English and English into Sindhi have also been developed.
