= Centre for Lexicography =

Danish research center

Coordinates: 56.1728°N 10.2057°E

Centre for Lexicography is a research centre affiliated with the Aarhus School of Business, University of Aarhus Denmark, and was established in 1996. The centre's aim is to carry out lexicographic research into needs-adapted information and data access, i.e. research work into dictionary theory in general and it has built a solid, international reputation in that field.

The centre is headed by professor Dr. Henning Bergenholtz who together with associate professor Dr. Sven Tarp, has proposed a theory that is often referred to as "the Aarhus School", see e.g. Bergenholtz/Nielsen/Tarp (2009) and Nielsen/Tarp (2009). The theory focuses on the functions of dictionaries, i.e. communication related functions (such as text reception, text production, text revision, text editing, and translation – which are all text-dependent) and knowledge related or cognitive functions (such as gaining knowledge in general or about a specific topic unrelated to a specific text). The theory focuses on the dictionary as a utility product, i.e. it provides a specific type of help to a specific type of user in specific types of user situations. The work at the Centre focuses on all aspects of lexicography, in particular LSP lexicography (e.g. Nielsen 1994; and Bergenholtz/Tarp 1995), learner's lexicography (e.g. Tarp 2008), language policy in dictionaries (e.g. Bergenholtz 2006), and dictionary reviewing (e.g. Nielsen 2009).

In addition to their theoretical work the staff at the Centre for Lexicography have published more than 30 printed and electronic dictionaries, often in collaboration with external partners. These dictionaries are all based on the theoretical principles developed at the centre and cover monolingual and bilingual general dictionaries, business dictionaries, law dictionaries and accounting dictionaries.
