= Multi-field dictionary =

Specialized dictionary

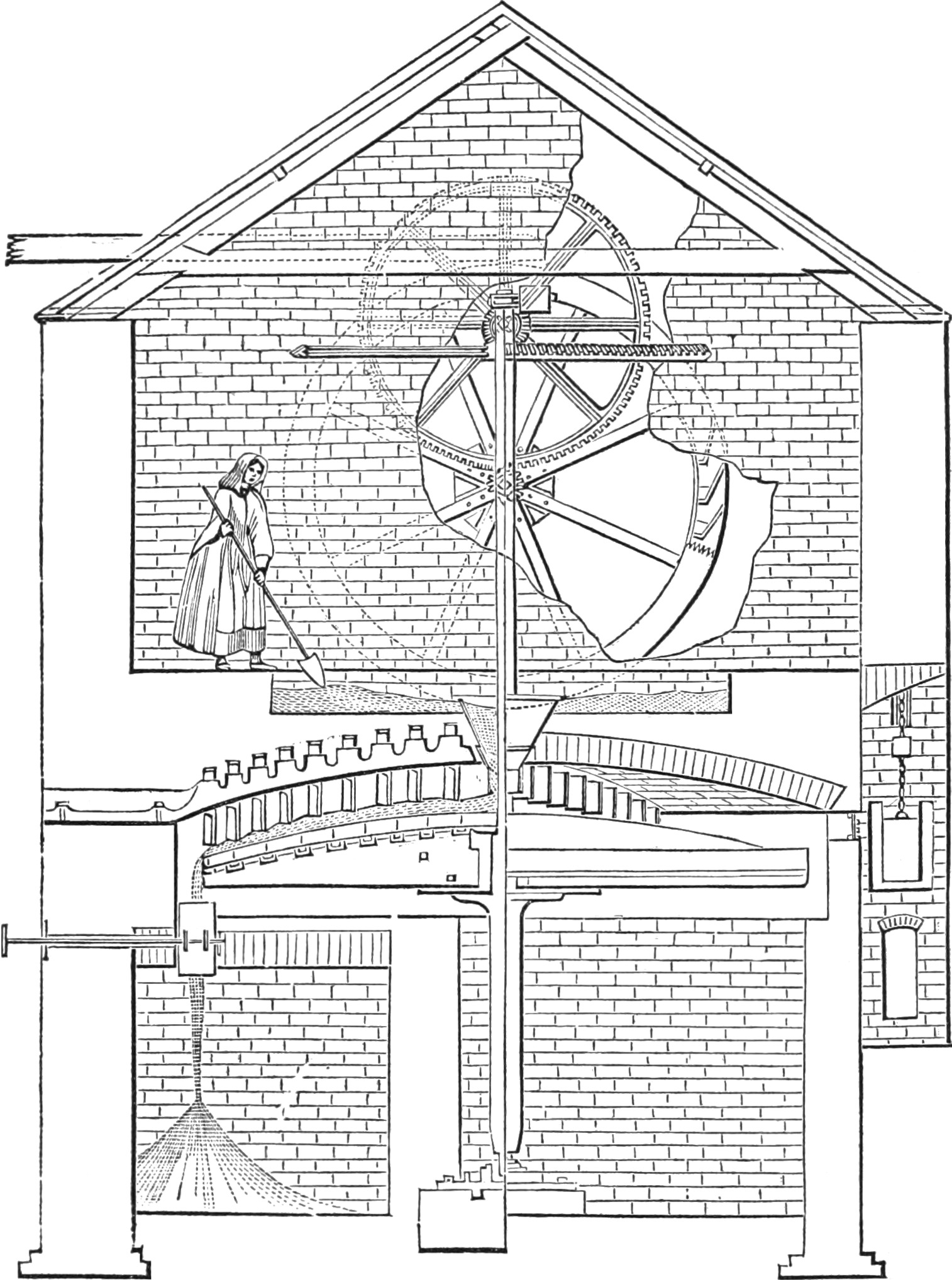
Dictionary of Arts, Manufactures, and Mines

A multi-field dictionary is a specialized dictionary that has been designed and compiled to cover the terms within two or more subject fields. Multi-field dictionaries should be contrasted with single-field dictionaries and sub-field dictionaries. The typology consisting of these three dictionaries is important for a number of reasons. First of all, a multi-field dictionary is an example of the ordinary technical dictionary, covering numerous subject fields, e.g. banking, economics, finance, insurance and marketing.

The main problem with multi-field dictionaries is that they tend to cover one or two subjects extensively, whereas the vast majority of subject are only represented by a limited number of terms.

Secondly, the typical multi-field dictionary tends to be a minimizing dictionary, i.e. it covers only a limited number of terms within the subjects covered.

Thirdly, if the lexicographers intend to make a bilingual, maximizing multi-field dictionary they run into problems with the large amount of data that has to be included in the dictionary.

Consequently, the best coverage of linguistic and extra-linguistic aspects within the subject field covered by a dictionary will be found in a single-field dictionary.
