= Single-field dictionary =

Dictionary specialized for one subject field

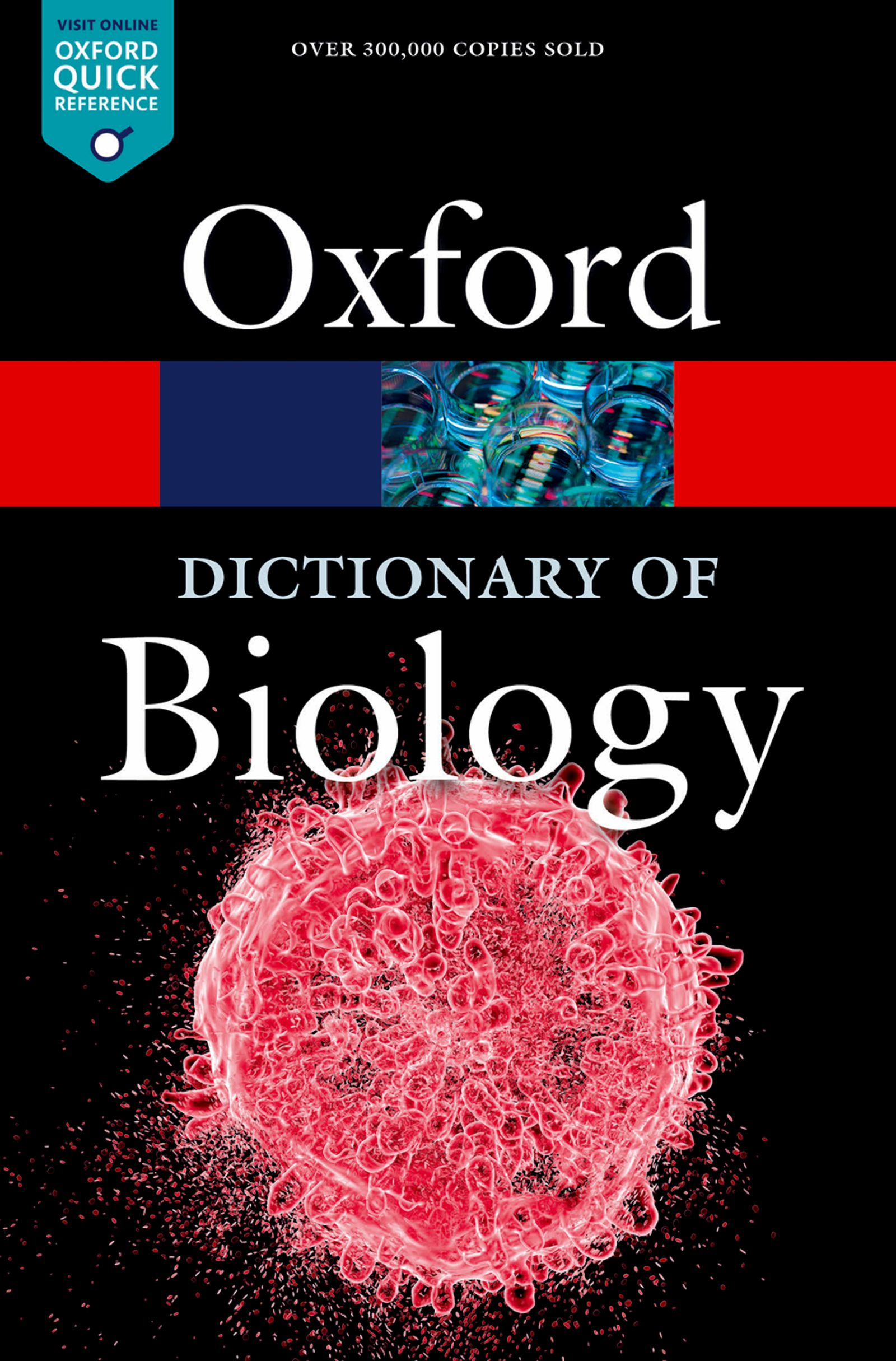
The Oxford Dictionary of Biology.

A single-field dictionary is a specialized dictionary that has been designed and compiled to cover the terms of one particular subject field. Single-field dictionaries should be contrasted with multi-field dictionaries and sub-field dictionaries.

Examples of single-field dictionaries are a dictionary of law, a dictionary of economics and a dictionary of welding.

The main advantage of single-field dictionaries is that they can easily be maximizing dictionaries, i.e. attempt to cover as many terms of the subject field as possible without being a dictionary in several volumes.
