= Sub-field dictionary =

Specialized dictionary

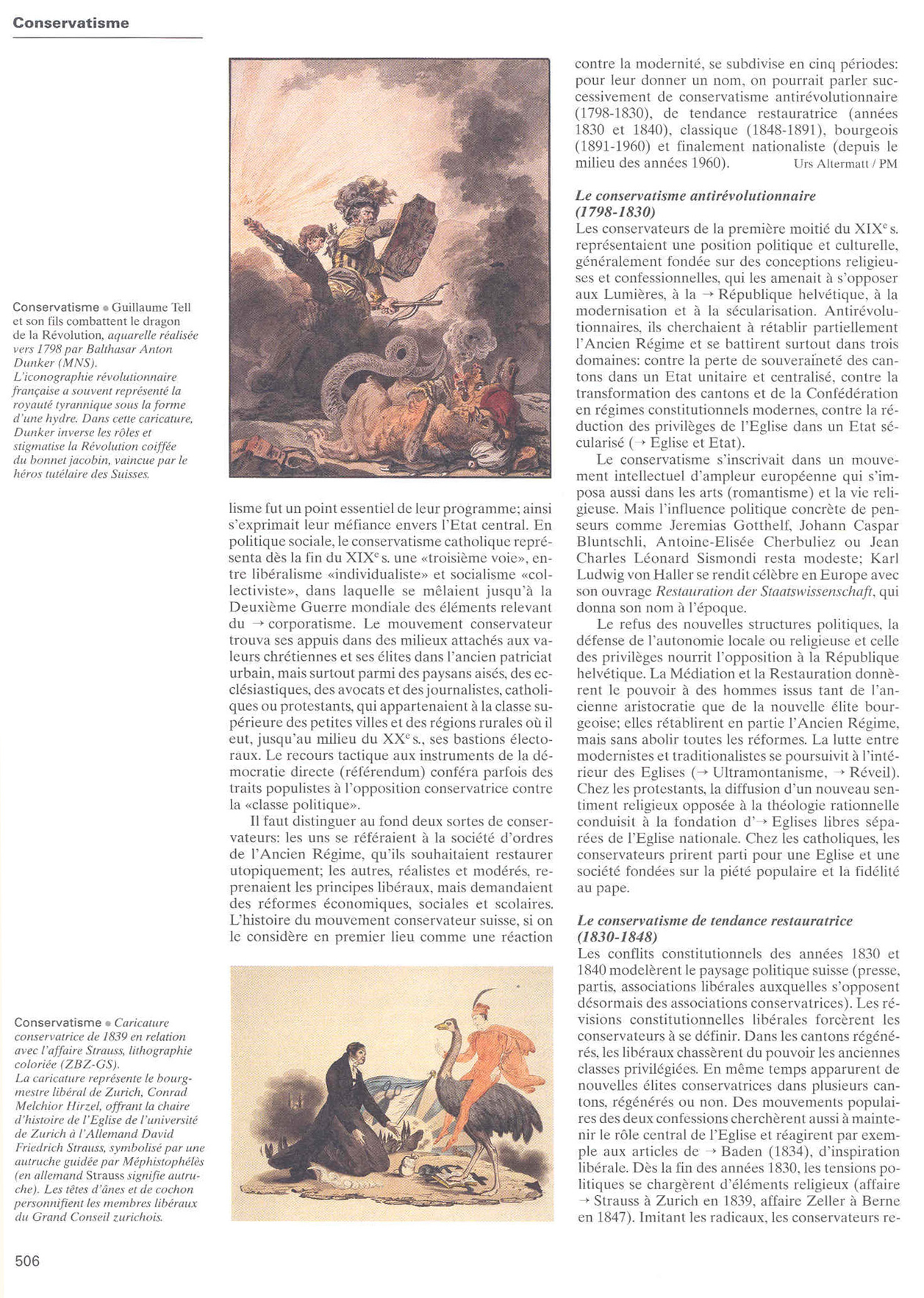
A page of the Historical Dictionary of Switzerland.

A sub-field dictionary is a specialized dictionary that has been designed and compiled to cover the terms of one (or possibly more) sub-fields of a particular subject field. It is therefore a sub-division of the class of dictionary called a single-field dictionary. Sub-field dictionaries should be contrasted with multi-field dictionaries and single-field dictionaries.

The typology consisting of these three dictionaries is important for a number of reasons. First of all a sub-field dictionary is an example of a very specialized dictionary in that it covers only a limited part of one single subject field. Examples of sub-field dictionaries are a dictionary of contract law (as opposed to the single-field dictionary of law) and a dictionary of fusion welding (as opposed to a dictionary of welding), or a dictionary of ethical philosophy (as opposed to a dictionary of philosophy).

The main advantage of sub-field dictionaries is that they can easily be maximizing dictionaries, i.e. deep rather than broad, attempting to cover as many terms of the sub-field as possible without expanding into several volumes. Consequently, sub-field dictionaries are ideal for extensive coverage of the linguistic and extra-linguistic aspects within a particular subject field.

Secondly, if the lexicographers intend to make a bilingual, maximizing sub-field dictionary they will not run into the same problems with the space available for presenting the large amount of data that has to be included in the dictionary, cf. a multi-field dictionary.

Consequently, the best coverage of linguistic and extra-linguistic aspects within the subject field covered by a dictionary will be found in a sub-field dictionary. The best coverage of a subject field will then be to compile a number of sub-field dictionaries that together cover the entire subject.
