= Monolingual learner's dictionary =

Type of dictionary for people learning a foreign language

A monolingual learner's dictionary (MLD) is designed to meet the reference needs of people learning a foreign language. MLDs are based on the premise that language-learners should progress from a bilingual dictionary to a monolingual one as they become more proficient in their target language, but that general-purpose dictionaries (aimed at native speakers) are inappropriate for their needs. Dictionaries for learners include information on grammar, usage, common errors, collocation, and pragmatics, which is largely missing from standard dictionaries, because native speakers tend to know these aspects of language intuitively. And while the definitions in standard dictionaries are often written in difficult language, those in an MLD use a simple and accessible defining vocabulary.

== History of English-language MLDs ==
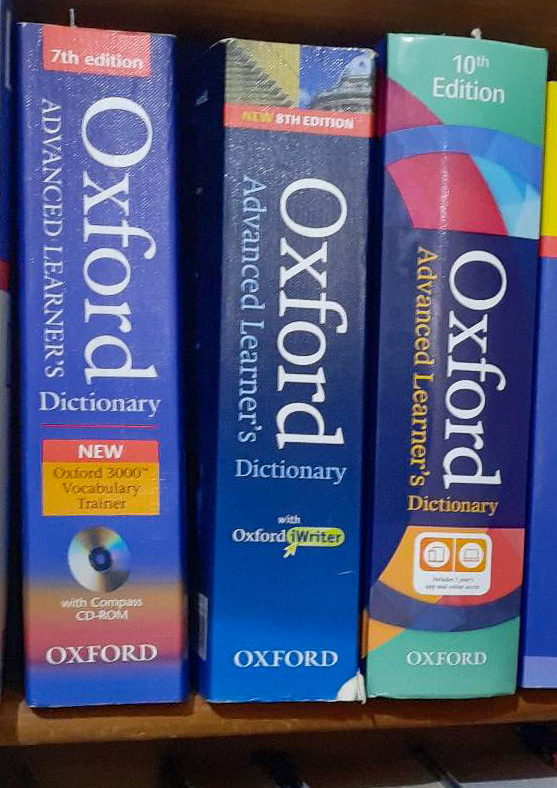
7th, 8th and 10th editions of the Oxford Advanced Learner's Dictionary.

The first English MLD, published in 1935, was the New Method English Dictionary by Michael West and James Endicott, a small dictionary using a restricted defining vocabulary of just 1490 words. Since the end of World War Two, global sales of the MLD have run into the tens of millions, reflecting the boom in the English language teaching industry.

Probably the best-known English monolingual dictionary for advanced learners is the Oxford Advanced Learner's Dictionary, now in its tenth edition. It was originally published in Japan in 1942 as The Idiomatic and Syntactic Dictionary of English, written by A. S. Hornby and two collaborators. It was subsequently republished as A Learner's Dictionary of Current English in 1948, before acquiring its current name.

Other publishers gradually entered the market. The Longman Dictionary of Contemporary English was published in 1978, and its most striking feature was the use of a restricted defining vocabulary, which is now a standard feature of learners' dictionaries. There are currently six major MLDs for advanced learners. In addition to the Oxford and Longman dictionaries, these are:

- Collins COBUILD English Language Dictionary, first published in 1987
- Cambridge International Dictionary of English, 1995, now published as the Cambridge Advanced Learner's Dictionary
- Macmillan English Dictionary for Advanced Learners, 2002
- Merriam-Webster's Advanced Learner's English Dictionary, 2008

All of these dictionaries are available in hard copy and online.

Since the 1980s, the English MLD has, arguably, been the most innovative area in the field of lexicography, in terms of both the way dictionaries are written and the aspects of language which dictionaries describe, in particular the use of software in combination with text corpora to:

- generate language description - a radical innovation which was introduced by the COBUILD project in the 1980s
- automate the dictionary-making process
- identify collocations

MLDs were among the first dictionaries to appear on CD-ROM, with the Longman Interactive English Dictionary leading the way in 1993. More recently the six MLDs listed above have become available in free online versions.

MLDs have been the subject of research into how people use dictionaries, as well as the subject of scholarly work. A standard book on the subject is Cowie 1999.

== Online dictionaries ==
The Internet offers a range of online dictionary resources. Some, like the Open Dictionary of English, are explicitly designed as learner's dictionaries, and may even include built-in, adaptive tutoring.
