= Tom McArthur (linguist) =

Scottish linguist (1938–2020)

- Born: 23 August 1938; 88 years ago Glasgow, Scotland
- Died: 30 March 2020 (aged 81); Histon and Impington
- Education: MA, University of Glasgow, 1958; PhD, University of Edinburgh, 1977
- Occupation: linguist (expert on English as a world language)
- Notable work: Longman Lexicon of Contemporary English; English Today; Worlds of Reference; Oxford Companion to the English Language; Oxford Guide to World English
- Spouse(s): Feri Mottahedin (married 1963, died 1993); Jacqueline Lam (married 2001)
- Children: 3
- Parents: Archibald McArthur (father); Margaret Burns (mother)

Thomas Burns McArthur (23 August 1938 – 30 March 2020) was a Scottish linguist, lexicographer, and the founding editor of English Today. Among the many books he wrote and edited, he is best known for the Longman Lexicon of Contemporary English (the first thematic monolingual learner's dictionary, which complemented the Longman Dictionary of Contemporary English by bringing together sets of words with related meanings); Worlds of Reference; and the Oxford Guide to World English (2002, paperback 2003).

McArthur's most notable work was The Oxford Companion to the English Language (1992), a 1200-page work with 95 contributors and 70 consultants. It was hailed by The Guardian as a "leviathan of accessible scholarship" and was listed on the Sunday Times bestseller list. He published an abridged edition in 1996 and a concise edition in 1998. A second edition was published in 2018, co-edited with Jacqueline Lam McArthur and Lise Fontaine.

Besides writing and editing books, McArthur also taught at the University of Exeter's Dictionary Research Centre. In 1987 he collaborated with David Crystal to produce an 18-part radio version of a TV series The Story of English for BBC World Service, and in 1997 he co-founded the Asian Association for Lexicography. Earlier in life, he had served as an officer-instructor in the British Army, taught at a secondary school in Sutton Coldfield (where he was also part-time reporter for the local newspaper), and later at the Cathedral School in Bombay. He published books about Indian philosophy and the Bhagavad Gita, researched and wrote about the languages of Scotland, and penned several unpublished novels.

McArthur died at age 81 on 30 March 2020.

== Appointments ==
- Lecturer and Director of Studies at Extra Mural English Language Courses, University of Edinburgh
- 1979–1983: Associate Professor of English, Université du Québec à Trois-Rivières, Canada
- 1987–2000: Visiting Professor, Dictionary Research Centre, University of Exeter
- 2001: Visiting Professor, Chinese University of Hong Kong, Lingnan University, Xiamen University

== Sources ==
- McArthur, Tom; Lam-McArthur, Jacqueline; Fontaine, Lise, eds. (2018). The Oxford Companion to the English Language (2nd ed.). Oxford: Oxford University Press. doi:10.1093/acref/9780199661282.001.0001. ISBN 978-0-19-966128-2. OCLC 1040511034. OL 30592905M. Wikidata Q135987047.
