= LearnThat Foundation =

U.S. non-profit organization

LearnThat
- Website type: Nonprofit
- Available in: English, French, German, Japanese, Mandarin Chinese, Portuguese, Russian
- Area served: Worldwide
- Founder: Rosevita Warda
- Revenue: Premium memberships, sponsorship, donations, grants
- Website: www.learnthat.org
- Registration: Optional
- Launched: February 2004

LearnThat Foundation is an American 501(c)(3) nonprofit organization that develops and manages an online vocabulary and spelling program along with a free multimedia learners' dictionary, Open Dictionary of English (ODE). The foundation was founded in February 2004 under the name eSpindle Learning. In August 2010, the name was changed to LearnThat Foundation, and its domain was moved to www.LearnThat.org. The program is branded as LearnThatWord.

== History ==
The organization was launched by parents, educators, English language learners and writers looking for a comprehensive solution to learning English vocabulary and spelling. Its board members include a Microsoft executive and a Senior Research Associate at the Education Development Center's Center for Children and Technology.

Premium membership fees range from $9.50 a month to $299 for a 10-year membership. The organization had 5000 members in 2007. It has since grown to over 300,000 members.

== Features ==
The program is based on its own dictionary database, containing 180,000 English words. The Open Dictionary of English contains audio from around the world, video snippets using the word in context, a large list of user samples and idioms, definitions from various sources, images, tutoring comments and much more. The program uses quizzes that are set for each member's learning profile, providing personalized spaced repetition review. In August 2010, the core program was renamed LearnThatWord.

Vocabulary tutoring is freely available to registered users. Spelling tutoring is a premium feature and requires a paid upgrade.

Performance reports and rewards are premium features as well. LearnThatWord also offers classroom features and allows teachers to send words directly to student accounts. All quiz units follow test-study principles to provide adaptive tutoring.

Sessions are designed as quizzes. The learner first receives feedback on their input, and then can explore the word in depth. This enhances results because it optimizes study time for the individual and each word. The instant feedback provided in this formative assessment motivates and accelerates learning. Words known can be set aside, while those that are not yet learned will enter LearnThatWord's practice cycle.

Practice words are reviewed over future sessions until the learner has answered correctly over a sequence of subsequent quizzes. Additional spaced review features are under development. LearnThatWord also offers a range of rewards for study effort.

Members can select from a large selection of ready-made goal modules, add their own word lists, or add a list from the word list archive.

The goal modules draw on the ODE's 180,000 word database. Large linguistic data sets merged with the word database allow for proper classification of words. Among others, LearnThatWord offers a Spelling Bee goal module of close to 30,000 words and an SAT module of over 5,000 words.

Detailed frequency datasets allow LearnThatWord to present words in a logical order: Allowing members to start with easy, everyday words and advance to harder ones in managed progression.

Currently LearnThatWord accepts both US and UK spelling variants as correct. Further localization is under development.

== Study modes ==
The program offers three quiz options.

Vocabulary quiz

Free vocabulary tutoring is available to all members. To avoid problems typically associated with multiple choice format. LearnThatWord takes a variety of steps to minimize guessing. In every session, words are matched with different alternate partners. In addition, the quiz format changes. A word will be tested in word-definitions, definition-words, and image-words constellations. Active word entry (spelling) is an optional last step, available to premium members.

Spelling quiz

Spelling quiz follows the classic spelling test/spelling bee format. The member hears a word, and can review the corresponding definition and a usage example. They are then required to enter the word into the text entry field.

Combo quiz

Combo quiz challenges the member to find the word based on definition, usage example and the number of letters in the word. Members can then request first letter, last letter, and finally the audio for the word. Entering the word correctly before listening to the audio earns a bonus point for the user.

== Literacy campaign ==
At the start of the 2010/11 school year, LearnThat Foundation started to make free tutoring available to third graders in the U.S. and Canada. This program, known as Vocabulary Junction, was expanded to serve all English learners, worldwide, during their first three years of learning the language.

== Awards ==
The program was awarded a Teachers' Choice Award (by Learning Magazine) in 2008. The organization was featured twice (2008 and 2011) as an "innovator company" by the Software and Information Industry Association (SIIA).

== See also ==
- Flashcards
- Spaced repetition
- Vocabulary development
