= New General Service List =

List of ca. 2800 words in English

The New General Service List (NGSL) is a list of 2,809 words (lemmas) claimed to be a list of words that second-language learners of the English language are most likely to meet in their daily lives. It was published by Charles Browne, Brent Culligan and Joseph Phillips in March 2013 and updated in 2016 and 2023.

The words in the NGSL represent the most important high-frequency words of the English language for second-language learners and is a major update of Michael West's 1953 GSL.

Although there are more than 600,000 words in the English language, the 2,800 words in the NGSL give more than 92% coverage for learners when trying to read most general texts of English.

The main goals of the NGSL project were to (1) modernize and greatly increase the size of the corpus used by, and to (2) create a list of words that provided a higher degree of coverage with fewer words than, the original GSL.

The 273-million-word subsection of the more than two-billion-word Cambridge English Corpus is about 100 times larger than the 2.5 million word corpus developed in the 1930s for the original GSL, and the approximately 2,800 words in the NGSL gives about 6% more coverage than the GSL (90% vs 84%) when both lists are lemmatized.

Copies of the NGSL in various forms (by headword, lemmatized, with definitions), published articles about the list and links to analytical tools and materials that use the NGSL are all available from the NGSL website.

== See also ==
- General Service List (GSL) a list of roughly 2000 words published by Michael West
- Swadesh list
- Français fondamental
- Vocabolario di base
