= Substitution table =

Teaching procedure

A substitution table is used while teaching structures of English. Substitution tables were invented by Harold E. Palmer, who defines substitution as "the process by which any authentic sentence may be multiplied indefinitely by substituting for any of its words or word-groups others of the same grammatical family and within certain semantic limits".

== Procedure for preparation ==
Language components to be taught must be used in a grammatically correct model sentence. Simple structures or language components must be the ones taught in initial stages, with only one item covered at a time. A word, phrase, idiom, or vocabulary item may be used as a tool. The words of a model sentence are substituted for by other words. The substitution words are of the same grammatical family in which the model sentence is drawn. The components (structure/words) must be simple so that the pupil can easily understand them.

== Types of Substitution tables ==
- Simple Substitution Table
- Compound Substitution Table
- Grammatical Substitution Table
- Perfect Substitution Table
- Imperfect Substitution table
