= Defining vocabulary =

List of words used by lexicographers to write dictionary definitions

A defining vocabulary is a list of words used by lexicographers to write dictionary definitions. The underlying principle goes back to Samuel Johnson's notion that words should be defined using 'terms less abstruse than that which is to be explained', and a defining vocabulary provides the lexicographer with a restricted list of high-frequency words which can be used for producing simple definitions of any word in the dictionary.

Defining vocabularies are especially common in English monolingual learner's dictionaries. The first such dictionary to use a defining vocabulary was the New Method English Dictionary by Michael West and James Endicott (published in 1935), a small dictionary written using a defining vocabulary of just 1,490 words. When the Longman Dictionary of Contemporary English was first published in 1978, its most striking feature was its use of a 2,000-word defining vocabulary based on Michael West's General Service List, and since then defining vocabularies have become a standard component of monolingual learner's dictionaries for English and for other languages.

== Differing opinions ==
Using a defining vocabulary is not without its problems, and some scholars have argued that it can lead to definitions which are insufficiently precise or accurate, or that words in the list are sometimes used in non-central meanings. The more common view, however, is that the disadvantages are outweighed by the advantages, and there is some empirical research which supports this position. Almost all English learner's dictionaries have a defining vocabulary, and these range in size between 2000 and 3000 words, for example:

- Longman Dictionary of Contemporary English: approximately 2,000 words
- Macmillan English Dictionary for Advanced Learners: approximately 2,500 words
- Oxford Advanced Learner's Dictionary: approximately 3,000 words

It is possible that, in electronic dictionaries at least, the need for a controlled defining vocabulary will disappear. In some online dictionaries, such as the Macmillan English Dictionary for Advanced Learners, every word in every definition is hyperlinked to its own entry, so that a user who is unsure of the meaning of a word in a definition can immediately see the definition for the word that is causing problems. However, this strategy works only if all the definitions are written in reasonably accessible language, which argues for some sort of defining vocabulary to be maintained in dictionaries aimed at language learners.

Intermediate-level language learners are likely to have receptive familiarity with most words in a typical 2,000-word defining vocabulary. To accommodate beginning-level learners, the defining vocabulary can be divided into two or more layers, where words in one layer are explained using only the simpler words from the previous layers. This strategy is used in the Learn These Words First multi-layer dictionary, where a 360-word beginning-level defining vocabulary is used to explain a 2,000-word intermediate-level defining vocabulary, which in turn is used to define the remaining words in the dictionary.

== See also ==
- Dictionary
- Core glossary
- Controlled Vocabulary
- Advanced learner's dictionary
- Basic English
- Appendix:Basic English word list
- E-Prime
