= A. S. Hornby =

English lexicographer (1898–1978)

Albert Sidney (or Sydney) Hornby, usually just A. S. Hornby (1898–1978), was an English grammarian, lexicographer, and pioneer in the field of English language learning and teaching (ELT).

Hornby was born in Chester and educated at University College London. In April 1924 he went to Japan to teach English at Oita University (Oita Higher Commercial School at the time). He joined Harold E. Palmer in his programme of vocabulary research at the Institute for Research in English Teaching (IRET). Palmer invited him to Tokyo in April 1933 as an assistant; in 1936, Hornby became the technical adviser and editor of IRET's Bulletin.

He began to work the following year with E. V. Gatenby and H. Wakefield on a new type of dictionary that was aimed at foreign learners of English, the first monolingual learners' dictionary. It was completed in 1940 and published by Kaitakusha two years later in Tokyo as The Idiomatic and Syntactic English Dictionary. After leaving Japan in 1942, Hornby joined the British Council and later became the first editor of the journal English Language Teaching, launched in October 1946.

In 1948 his dictionary was reissued by Oxford University Press as A Learner's Dictionary of Current English. The subsequent editions of the dictionary were (1963 second, 1974 third) and continue to be a great commercial success in ELT publishing. It is now in its tenth edition and is known as the Oxford Advanced Learner's Dictionary.

The A.S. Hornby Educational Trust was established in 1961. The Trust supports ELT practitioners from low and lower-middle income countries. The Trust has supported over 480 ELT professionals from around the world via Hornby Scholarships, and thousands more via regional schools, a scholar alumni network and Teacher Association project awards. The Trust also supports dictionary-related research and research into the history of ELT.
