= English Through Actions =

English through Actions is a book about the direct method of language education written by Harold E. Palmer and his daughter, Dorothee Palmer. It was first published in 1925 by the Japanese publisher Kaitakusha. The book includes various systematic materials for standard students, and helps teachers reduce preparation time.

== Synopsis ==
- General Introduction
- The Technique of Speech-Teaching
- Notes concerning the Treatment of certain difficulties connected with Elementary English Grammar and Composition
- Imperative Drill（Collective）
- Imperative Drill（Individual）
- Conventional Conversation
- Free Oral Assimilation
- Action Chains
- List of Objects, Substances, Pictures, etc., recommended in connection with "English Through Actions"
- The Names of the Pupils
