= General Service List =

List of roughly 2,000 most frequent words in English

The General Service List (GSL) is a list of roughly 2,000 words published by Michael West in 1953. The words were selected to represent the most frequent words of English and were taken from a corpus of written English. The target audience was English language learners and ESL teachers. To maximize the utility of the list, some frequent words that overlapped broadly in meaning with words already on the list were omitted. In the original publication the relative frequencies of various senses of the words were also included.

== Details ==
A person who knows all the words on the list and their related families would understand approximately 90–95 per cent of colloquial speech and 80–85 per cent of common written texts. The list consists only of headwords, which means that the word "be" is high on the list, but assumes that the person is fluent in all forms of the word, e.g. am, is, are, was, were, being, and been.

Researchers have expressed doubts about the adequacy of the GSL because of its age and the relatively low coverage provided by the words not in the first 1,000 words of the list. Engels was, in particular, critical of the limited vocabulary chosen by West (1953), and while he concurred that the first 1,000 words of the GSL were good selections based on their high frequency and wide range, he was of the opinion that the words beyond the first 1,000 of the GSL could not be considered general service words because the range and frequency of these words were too low to be included in the list. Recent research by Billuroğlu and Neufeld (2005) confirmed that the General Service List was in need of minor revision, but the headwords in the list still provide approximately 80% text coverage in written English. The research showed that the GSL contains a small number of archaic terms, such as shilling, while excluding words that have gained currency since the first half of the twentieth century, such as plastic, television, battery, okay, victim, and drug.

The GSL evolved over several decades before West's publication in 1953. The GSL is not a list based solely on frequency, but includes groups of words on a semantic basis. Various versions float around the Internet, and attempts have been made to improve it.

There are two major updates of the GSL:

1. the New General Service List (new-GSL) by Brezina & Gablasova, originally published in Applied Linguistics in 2013. This wordlist is based on the analysis of four language corpora of a total size of over 12 billion words.
2. the New General Service List (NGSL), published in March 2013 by Browne, Culligan and Phillips. The NGSL was based on a 273 million-word subsection of the 2 billion-word Cambridge English Corpus. Preliminary results show that the new list provides a substantially higher degree of coverage with fewer words.

Some ESL dictionaries use the General Service List as their controlled defining vocabulary. In the Longman Dictionary of Contemporary English, each definition is written using the 2000-word Longman Defining Vocabulary based on the GSL.

== See also ==
- New General Service List: a major update of the GSL which provides higher coverage with fewer words than the GSL, developed by Charles Browne, Brent Culligan and Joe Phillips
- International English
- Globish developed by Jean-Paul Nerrière
- Basic English developed by Charles Kay Ogden.
- Academic Word List developed as an extension to the General Service List by Averil Coxhead
- Swadesh list
- Dolch word list
- Thing Explainer
