= Harold E. Palmer =

English linguist and phonetician

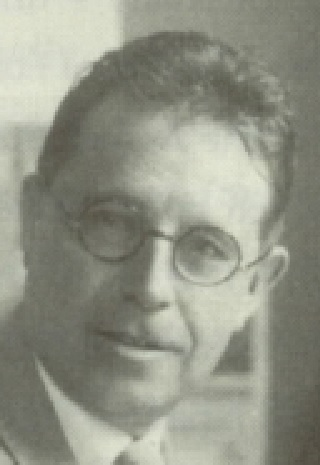
Image of Harold E. Palmer

Harold Edward Palmer, usually just Harold E. Palmer (6 March 1877 – 16 November 1949), was an English linguist, phonetician and pioneer in the field of teaching English as a second language. Especially he dedicated himself to the Oral Method, also known as the Oral Approach, the Situational Approach, or Situational Language Teaching (SLT). He stayed in Japan for 14 years and reformed its English education. He contributed to the development of the applied linguistics of the 20th century.

Palmer was born in London. In 1892–1893, he studied in France. In 1902, he went to Belgium and started teaching English at Berlitz school. In 1903, he established his own school. In 1915, he started teaching at University College London. In 1922, he was invited by Masataro Sawayanagi, Kojiro Matsukata and went to Japan. In Japan, he became 'Linguistic Adviser' to the Japanese Department of Education. In 1923, he established the Institute for Research in English Teaching (IRET), now the Institute for Research in Language Teaching (IRLT), and became the first director. He founded the institute's Bulletin. In 1935, he was awarded D.Litt. by Tokyo Imperial University. In 1936, he returned to England and became consultant for Longmans, Green. In 1937, he published Thousand-Word English with A. S. Hornby, the main creator of the first Advanced Learner's Dictionary. During World War II he lived in England, and assisted the war effort with his language skills, publishing three booklets about the French language, to assist soldiers preparing for the invasion of Normandy.

== Publications ==
- 1924-Memorandum on Problems of English Teaching in the Light of a New Theory, A Grammar of Spoken English
- 1925-English through Actions
- 1929-Eigo no rokushukan (The First Six Weeks of English)
- 1930-Interim Report on Vocabulary Selection, The Principles of Romanization
- 1931-Second Interim Report on Vocabulary Selection
- 1932-This Language-Learning Business(With H. Vere Redman)
- 1933-Second Interim Report on English Collocations, A New Classification of English Tones
- 1934-Specimens of English Construction Patterns, An Essay in Lexicology
- 1937-Thousand-Word English(With A. S. Hornby)
- 1938-A Grammar of English Words
- 1940-The Teaching of Oral English
- 1943-International English Coursestarted.
- 1944- A Beginner's English-French Dictionary
- 1944- Speak and Understand French
- 1944- A French-English Conversation Dictionary

A more detailed list:

Palmer, H. E. (1917). A First Course in English Phonetics, including an Explanation of the Scope of the Science of Phonetics, the Theory of Sounds, a Catalogue of English Sounds and a Number of Articulation, Pronunciation and Transcription Exercises. Cambridge, Heffer and Sons.

Palmer, H. E. (1917). The Scientific Study and Teaching of Languages: A Review of the Factors and Problems Connected with the Learning and Teaching of Modern Languages with an Analysis of the Various Methods which may be Adopted in order to Attain Satisfactory Results. London, Harrap.

Palmer, H. E. (1921). The Oral Method of Teaching Languages: A Monograph on Conversational Methods together with a Full Description and Abundant Examples of Fifty Appropriate Forms of Work. Cambridge, Heffer and Sons.

Palmer, H. E. (1921). The Principles of Language-study. London, Harrap.

Palmer, H. E. (1922). Everyday Sentences in Spoken English, with Phonetic Transcription and Intonation Marks (for the Use of Foreign Students). Cambridge, Heffer and Sons.

Palmer, H.E. (1922). English Intonation, With Systematic Exercises

Palmer, H. E. (1923). Colloquial English. Part 1. 100 Substitution Tables. (3rd Edition). Cambridge, Heffer and Sons.

Palmer, H. E. (1924). A Grammar of Spoken English, on a Strictly Phonetic Basis. Cambridge, Heffer and Sons.

Palmer, H. E. (1924). Memorandum on Problems of English Teaching in the Light of a New Theory. Tokyo, Institute for Research in English Teaching.

Palmer, H. E. (1925). The Principles of English Phonetic Notation. Tokyo, Institute for Research in English Teaching.

Palmer, H. E. (1925). Progressive Exercises in the English Phones. Tokyo, Institute for Research in English Teaching.

Palmer, H. E. (1925). Systematic Exercises in English Sentence-Building. Stage II. Tokyo, Institute for Research in English Teaching.

Palmer, H. E. (1926). English through Questions and Answers. Book I (Part I). Corresponding to Book I, Part I of the Readers. Tokyo, Institute for Research in English Teaching.

Palmer, H. E. (1926). English through Questions and Answers. Book II (Part I). Tokyo, Institute for Research in English Teaching.

Palmer, H. E. (1926). Graded Exercises in English Composition. Book I (Part II). Corresponding to the Book I (Part II) of the Standard English Readers. Tokyo, Institute for Research in English Teaching

Kennard, J. S. and H. E. Palmer (1926). Thinking in English. (7th Edition). Tokyo, Institute for Research in English Teaching.

Palmer, H. E. (1927). The Five Speech-learning Habits. Tokyo, Institute for Research in English Teaching.

Palmer, H. E. (1927). Graded Exercises in English Composition. Book II (Part I). Corresponding to the Book II (Part I) of the Standard English Readers. Tokyo, Institute for Research in English Teaching.

Palmer, H. E. (1927). Graded Exercises in English Composition. Book II (Part II). Corresponding to Book II (Part II) of the Standard English Readers. Tokyo, Institute for Research in English Teaching.

Palmer, H. E. (1927). The Reformed English Teaching. Tokyo, Institute for Research in English Teaching.

Palmer, H. E. (1927). Some Specimens of English Phonetic Transcription (with Intonation and Key). Tokyo, Institute for Research in English Teaching.

Palmer, H. E. (1927). Specimen of One Complete Unit in the Reader System. Tokyo, Institute for Research in English Teaching.

Palmer, H. E. (1928). A First Course of English Phonetics, including an Explanation of the Scope of the Science of Phonetics, the Theory of Sounds, a Catalogue of English Sounds and a Number of Articulation, Pronunciation and Transcription Exercises. (2nd Edition). Cambridge, Heffer and Sons.

Palmer, H. E. (1928). The Language Study Library. Concerning Pronunciation. Tokyo, Institute for Research in English Teaching.

Palmer, H.E. (1928). Classroom Procedures and Devices (In Connection With English Teaching). The Language Study Library, Volume Two. Tokyo, The Institute for Research in English Teaching.

Palmer, H. E. (1929). The First Six Weeks of English. Tokyo, Institute for Research in English Teaching.

Palmer, H. E. (1931). The Technique of Question-answering. Tokyo, Institute for Research in English Teaching.

Palmer, H. E. (1932). On Learning to Read Foreign Languages: A Memorandum. Tokyo, Institute for Research in English Teaching.

Palmer, H. E. (1933). Second Interim Report on English Collocations, Submitted to the Tenth Annual Conference of English Teachers under the Auspices of the Institute for Research in English Teaching. Tokyo, Institute for Research in English Teaching.

Palmer, H. E. (1934). The Grading and Simplifying of Literary Material. Tokyo, Institute for Research in English Teaching.

Palmer, H. E. (1934). The Institute for Research in English Teaching: its History and Work. Tokyo, Institute for Research in English Teaching.

Palmer, H. E. (1936). Conversational English. Tokyo, Kaitakusha.

Faucett, L.W., H.E. Palmer, et al. (1936). Interim Report on Vocabulary Selection for the Teaching of English as a Foreign Language. London, King. [Introduction and extract in Selected Writings.]

Palmer, H. E. (1938). A Grammar of English Words: One Thousand English Words and their Pronunciation, together with Information concerning the Several Meanings of Each Word, its Inflections and Derivatives, and the Collocations and Phrases into which it Enters. London, Longmans, Green.

Palmer, H. E. (1938). The New Method Grammar. London, Longmans, Green.

Palmer, H. E. ([c.1938]). How to Use the New Method Grammar. A Teacher's Handbook. London, Longmans, Green.

Palmer, H. E. (1938). New Method Series. English Practice Books. Book I. Elementary Oral Exercises. London, Longmans, Green.

Palmer, H. E. (1938). New Method Series. English Practice Books. Book II. Oral Exercises and Written Compositions. London, Longmans, Green.

Palmer, H. E. (1939). New Method Series. English Practice Books. Book III: More Advanced Oral Exercises and Written Compositions. London, Longmans, Green.

Palmer, H. E. (1944). Foreign Language Teaching: Past, Present and Future. Buenos Aires, Mitchell's English Book-Store.

Palmer, H. E. (1958). The Teaching of Oral English. (Revised Impression). London, Longmans, Green.

Palmer, H. E. (1964). Language and Language Learning. The Principles of Language-study. London, Oxford University Press.

Palmer, H. E. (1965). Language and Language Learning. Curso Internacional de Inglés. London, Oxford University Press.

Palmer, H. E. (1968). Language and Language Learning. The Scientific Study and Teaching of Languages. London, Oxford University Press.

Palmer, H. E. and F. G. Blandford (1927). Everyday Sentences in Spoken English, with Phonetic Transcription and Intonation Marks (for the Use of Foreign Students). (3rd Edition). Cambridge, Heffer and Sons.

Palmer, H. E. and F. G. Blandford (1928). English Pronunciation through Questions and Answers. Cambridge, Heffer and Sons.

Palmer, H. E. and F. G. Blandford (1935). Everyday Sentences in Spoken English, with Phonetic Transcription and Intonation Marks (for the Use of Foreign Students). (5th Edition). Cambridge, Heffer and Sons.

Palmer, H. E. and F. G. Blandford (1939). A Grammar of Spoken English, on a Strictly Phonetic Basis. (2nd Edition). Cambridge, Heffer and Sons.

Palmer, H. E., F. G. Blandford, et al. (1969). A Grammar of Spoken English. (3rd Edition). Cambridge, Heffer.

Palmer, H. E. and A. S. Hornby (1937). Thousand-word English: What it is and What can be Done with it. London, Harrap.

Palmer, H. E. and A. S. Hornby (1939). Thousand-word English Junior Series. Stories from Grimm. Adapted and Rewritten within the Thousand-word Vocabulary. London, Harrap.

Palmer, H. E. and J. V. Martin (1926). English through Questions and Answers. Book I (Part II). Corresponding to Book I, Part II of the Readers. Tokyo, Institute for Research in English Teaching.

Palmer, H. E., J. V. Martin, et al. (1929). A Dictionary of English Pronunciation with American Variants, in Phonetic Transcription. (2nd Edition). Cambridge, Heffer and Sons.

Palmer, H. E. and D. Palmer (1925). English through Actions, (this Forming Part of the “Oral Ostensive Line of Approach” of the Standard English Course in Preparation by the institute). Tokyo, Institute for Research in English Teaching.

Palmer, H. E., E. K. Venables, et al. (1930). The Standard English Readers for Girls. Book One. Tokyo, Institute for Research in English Teaching.

Wilson, J. and H. E. Palmer (1955). New English Course. Grammar and Composition for Reader 3. London, Longmans, Green.

Wilson, J. and H. E. Palmer (1955). New English Course. Reader 3. London, Longmans, Green.

Additionally:

Naganuma, N. (ed.) (1934). A Commemorative Volume Issued by the Institute for Research in English Teaching on the Occasion of the Tenth Annual Conference of English Teachers Held under its Auspices. Tokyo, Institute for Research in English Teaching

The Bulletin of the Institute for Research in English Teaching (photographically reproduced in 7 volumes), ed. Institute for Research in Language Teaching (1985), Tokyo: Meicho Fukyu Kai

== The Five Speech-Learning Habits ==
- Auditory Observation
- Oral Imitation
- Catenizing
- Semanticizing
- Composition by Analogy

Composition by analogy is often referred to as the generative principle. Palmer coined the term "ergon", defined as a phrase that serves as a syntactic prototype from which pupils can construct further sentences. "The learners' task is to acquire these ergons or 'primary matter' as a database which will then serve them to generate many more analogous sentences - 'secondary matter' according to Palmer."
