= Cambridge Advanced Learner's Dictionary =

Dictionary of the English language

- CALD 3rd Ed.
- Headquarters: Cambridge
- Country of origin: England
- Owner: Cambridge University Press & Assessment
- Creator: Cambridge University
- Website: dictionary.cambridge.org

Cambridge Advanced Learner's Dictionary 3rd Edition CD-ROM

The Cambridge Advanced Learner's Dictionary (CALD), commonly referred to as the Cambridge Dictionary, is a British dictionary of the English language. It was first published in 1995 under the title Cambridge International Dictionary of English by the Cambridge University Press. The latest version of the dictionary is Cambridge Advanced Learner's Dictionary 4th Edition which was informed by the Cambridge International Corpus. The dictionary has over 140,000 words, phrases, and meanings including words from the areas of technology, media, language, society and lifestyle. With 32-page Focus on Writing section, it is suitable for learners at CEF levels B2–C2.

There is an online version of Cambridge Advanced Learner's Dictionary & Thesaurus with different translation dictionaries.

== Editions ==
- First edition first published in 2003.
- Second edition first published in 2005.
- Third edition first published in 2008.
- Fourth edition first published in 2013.

== Word of the Year ==
The Cambridge Dictionary Word of the Year, by Cambridge University Press & Assessment, has been published every year since 2015. The word is chosen based on data of what people look up in the dictionary's search engine. In 2020, the word was quarantine, due to the lockdowns caused by the COVID-19 pandemic. In 2021, the word was perseverance. In 2022, the word was homer, caused by Wordle players, especially non-American ones, looking up five-letter words that could be used in the game.

== See also ==
- Advanced learner's dictionary
