= Academic Word List =

Vocabulary for learners of English for higher education

The Academic Word List (AWL) is a word list of 570 English word families which appear with great frequency in a broad range of academic texts. The target readership is English as a second or foreign language students intending to enter English-medium higher education, and teachers of such students. The AWL was developed by Averil Coxhead at the School of Linguistics and Applied Language Studies at Victoria University of Wellington, New Zealand. This list replaced the previously widely used University Word List, developed by Xue and Nation in 1986. The words included in the AWL were selected based on their range (breadth of academic areas covered), frequency, and dispersion (uniformity of frequency), and were divided into ten sublists, each containing 1000 words in decreasing order of frequency. The AWL excludes words from the General Service List (the 2000 highest-frequency words in general texts). Many words in the AWL are general vocabulary not restricted to an academic domain, such as the words area, approach, create, similar, and occur, found in Sublist One, and the AWL only accounts for a small percentage of the actual word occurrences in academic texts.

In the second decade of the twenty-first century, a revised list, called the New Academic Word List (NAWL), was developed and made public. This list is available on the Simple English Wiktionary.

The Academic Vocabulary List, based on the Academic Word List, drawing from the Corpus of Contemporary American English (COCA), was developed by Gardner and Davies in 2013. Rather than relying on word families, like the AWL, the AVL is composed of 3000 English lemmas, and provides a broader coverage of Academic English.

== See also ==
- General Service List
