= Averil Coxhead =

New Zealand professor of linguistics (born 1966)

Averil Coxhead FRSNZ
- Born: 1966 (age 59–60)
- Awards: Fellow of the Royal Society Te Apārangi

Academic background
- Education: Victoria University of Wellington
- Thesis: Using vocabulary from input texts in written tasks (2008)

Averil Jean Coxhead FRSNZ (born 1966) is a New Zealand academic and a professor at Victoria University of Wellington, specialising in applied linguistics. She is known for creating the Academic Word List, which is a list of 570 English word families that appear with great frequency in a broad range of academic texts. She has also created wordlists for other uses, such as rugby terms for referees and players, and building terms for Tongan tradespeople.

== Academic career ==
Coxhead completed a PhD titled Using vocabulary from input texts in writing tasks at Victoria University of Wellington in 2008. Coxhead then joined the faculty of Victoria University, rising to Professor in 2022. As of 2026, Coxhead is Dean of the Faculty of Humanities and Social Sciences.

Coxhead is known for creating the Academic Word List, which is a list of 570 English word families that appear with great frequency in a broad range of academic texts. Coxhead created the list when she noticed how much she relied on reading for her own foreign language learning, but had difficulty accessing appropriate texts. She had tried reading children's books but found they contained too many low-frequency words. She also saw how learners in a programme she taught in benefited from an approach called extensive reading.

Coxhead went on to create a list of words, such as 'ruck', 'loosie', 'maul', and phrases such 'swing it away' and 'clean out', that occur more often in rugby-related situations than ordinary English. The list is designed to be useful to anyone needing to learn the technical terms associated with rugby, but especially players, referees and coaches working internationally. With colleague Jean Parkinson, Coxhead has researched the language used in trades such as plumbing, building and automotive fabrication, and written bilingual books for Tongan tradespeople.

In 2026 Coxhead was elected a Fellow of the Royal Society Te Apārangi.

== Selected works ==
=== Books ===
- Coxhead, Averil (18 September 2017). Vocabulary and English for Specific Purposes Research. Routledge. doi:10.4324/9781315146478. ISBN 978-1-315-14647-8.
- Coxhead, Averil; Parkinson, Jean; Mackay, James; McLaughlin, Emma (12 September 2019), "Language in the trades and English for specific purposes", English for Vocational Purposes, New York : Taylor and Francis, 2019. | Series: Routledge research in English for specific purposes: Routledge, pp. 1–20, doi:10.4324/9780429449932-1, ISBN 978-0-429-44993-2

=== Journal articles ===
- Coxhead, Averil Jean (2000). "A New Academic Word List". TESOL Quarterly. 34 (2): 213. doi:10.2307/3587951. Wikidata Q124361805.
- Coxhead, Averil Jean (2015). "Reflecting on Coxhead (2000), "A New Academic Word List"". TESOL Quarterly. 50 (1): 181–185. doi:10.1002/tesq.287. Wikidata Q124361783.
- Jennifer F. Drayton; Coxhead, Averil Jean (2022). "Plain Language or Anything But?". Journal of Aviation/Aerospace Education & Research. doi:10.15394/jaaer.2022.1908. Wikidata Q124361754.
- Cailing Lu; Frank Boers; Coxhead, Averil Jean (2021). "Exploring learners' understanding of technical vocabulary in Traditional Chinese Medicine". Studies in Second Language Learning and Teaching. 11 (1): 71–101. doi:10.14746/ssllt.2021.11.1.4. Wikidata Q124361755.
- Coxhead, Averil Jean (2011). "The Academic Word List 10 Years On: Research and Teaching Implications". TESOL Quarterly. 45 (2): 355–362. doi:10.5054/tq.2011.254528. Wikidata Q124361797.
- Coxhead, Averil Jean; David Hirsch (2007). "A pilot science-specific word list". Revue française de linguistique appliquée. XII (2): 65–78. doi:10.3917/rfla.122.0065. Wikidata Q124361803.
- Coxhead, Averil Jean, What can corpora tell us about English for Academic Purposes?, doi:10.4324/9780203856949.ch33, Wikidata Q124361800
- Frank Boers; Thuy Bui; Julie Deconinck; Hélène Stengers; Coxhead, Averil Jean (2023). "Helping learners develop autonomy in acquiring multiword expressions". The Modern Language Journal. 107 (1): 222–241. doi:10.1111/modl.12829. Wikidata Q124361807.
