= Macmillan English Dictionary for Advanced Learners =

British dictionary

Macmillan English Dictionary for Advanced Learners, also known as MEDAL, is an advanced learner's dictionary published from 2002 until 2023 by Macmillan Education. It shares most of the features of this type of dictionary: it provides definitions in simple language, using a controlled defining vocabulary; most words have example sentences to illustrate how they are typically used; and information is given about how words combine grammatically or in collocations. MEDAL also introduced a number of innovations. These include:

- "collocation boxes" giving lists of high-frequency collocates, identified using Sketch Engine software
- word frequency information, with the most frequent 7500 English words shown in red and categorised in three frequency bands, based on the idea, derived from Zipf's law, that a relatively small number of high-frequency words account for a high percentage of most texts
- "metaphor boxes", showing how the vocabulary used for expressing common concepts (such as "anger") tends to reflect a common metaphorical framework. This is based on George Lakoff's ideas of conceptual metaphor
- a 50-page section providing guidance on writing academic English, based on a collaboration with the Centre for English Corpus Linguistics in Louvain, Belgium and using the Centre's learner corpus data

The Macmillan English Dictionary also existed as an electronic dictionary, available free on the Web. Like most online dictionaries, it benefits from being able to update content regularly with new words and meanings. In addition to the dictionary, the online version had a thesaurus function enabling users to find synonyms for any word, phrase or meaning. There was also a blog (the Macmillan Dictionary Blog) with daily postings on language issues, especially on global English and language change. An "Open Dictionary" allowed users to provide their own dictionary entries for new words they had come across. The online edition was recognised as a good example of this emerging genre of reference publishing. The website of the electronic dictionary and the blog were closed on 30 June 2023.

== Related publications ==
- Macmillan Essential Dictionary, a shorter version that contains the most basic vocabulary (over 45,000 headwords)
