= Oxford Advanced Learner's Dictionary =

First advanced learner's dictionary of English

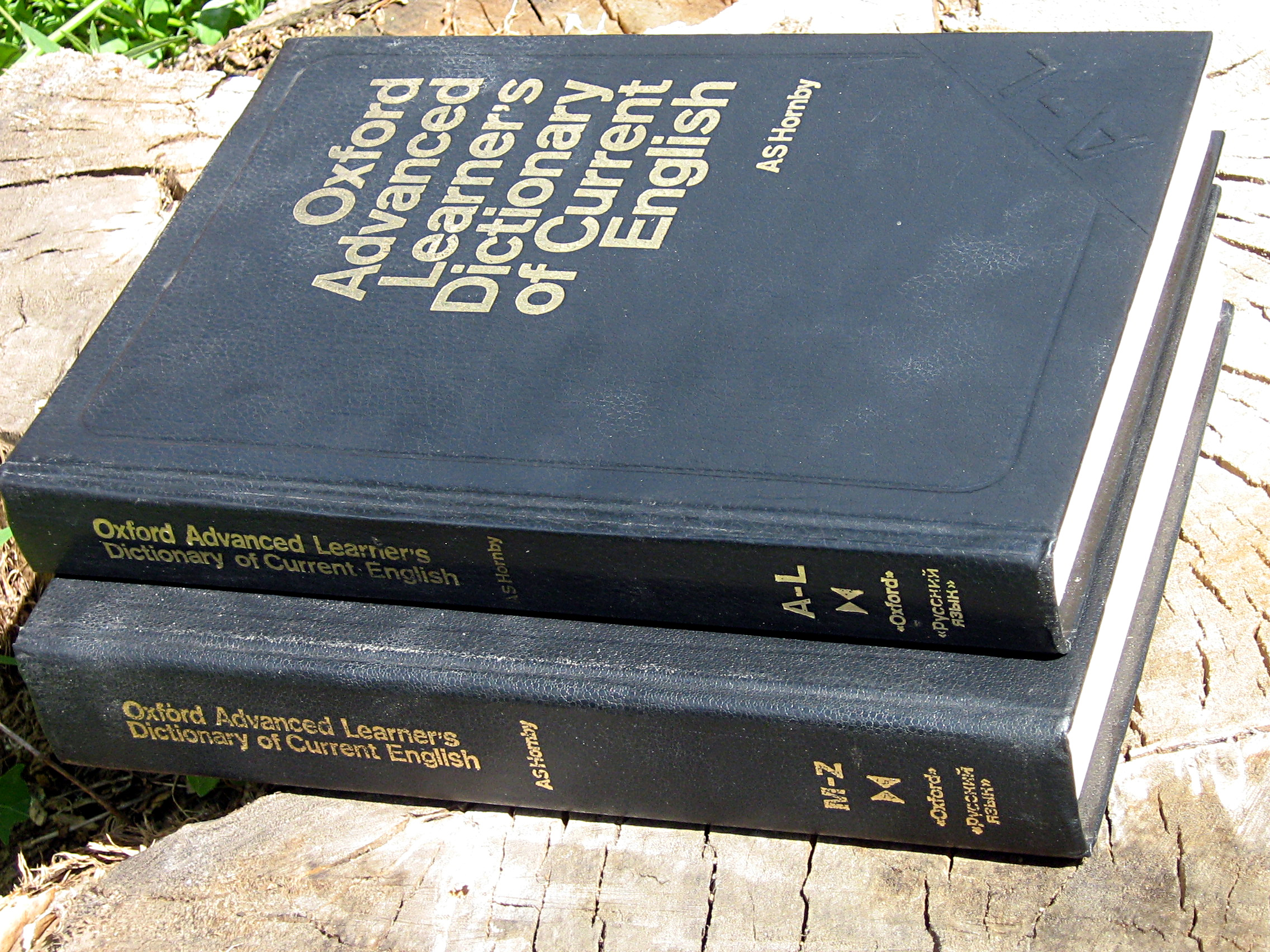
Oxford Advanced Learner's Dictionary of Current English. Special edition in two volumes (USSR, 1982).

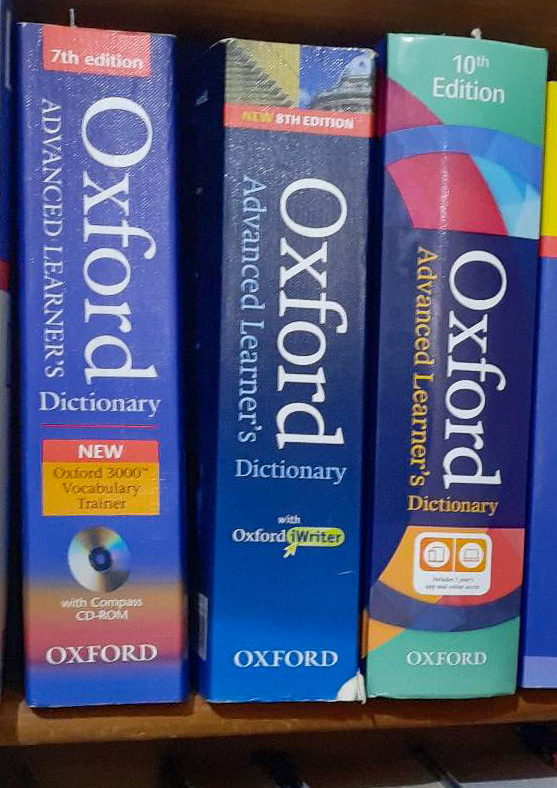
7th, 8th and 10th editions of the Oxford Advanced Learner's Dictionary

The Oxford Advanced Learner's Dictionary (OALD) was the first advanced learner's dictionary of English. It was first published in 1948. It is the largest English-language dictionary from Oxford University Press aimed at a non-native audience.

Users with a more linguistic interest, requiring etymologies or copious references, usually prefer the Concise Oxford English Dictionary, or indeed the comprehensive Oxford English Dictionary, or other dictionaries aimed at speakers of English with native-level competence.

== History ==
The Oxford Advanced Learner's Dictionary, previously entitled the Oxford Advanced Learner's Dictionary of Current English, started life as the Idiomatic and Syntactic Dictionary, edited by Albert Sydney Hornby. It was first published in Japan in 1942. It then made a perilous wartime journey to Britain where it came under the wing of OUP, which decided it would be the perfect counterpart for the prestigious OED.

A. S. Hornby was a teacher of English studies at a small college in Japan; he had gone there in 1923 to teach literature, but his experiences in the classroom drew his attention to the need for sound principles of language teaching. At that time Harold E. Palmer headed the Institute for Research into English Teaching in Tokyo, and in 1931 he invited Hornby to work on vocabulary development at the Institute. The result of this was the Idiomatic and Syntactic Dictionary, published by Kaitakusha in 1942. A year before publication, Hornby had managed to send an advance copy in sheets of the book to B. Ifor Evans at the British Council, a tough feat during the war. Ifor Evans offered him a job, and in 1942 Hornby came back to Britain and joined the Council, which posted him to Iran.

The sheets reached Humphrey S. Milford, then publisher to the University of Oxford and effectively OUP's managing director. Milford saw immediately that the dictionary could fill a troublesome gap in the Press's lists, since it was compiled for non-English speakers and rested on Hornby's solid experience in teaching the language overseas. Thus it explained spelling, grammar, phonetics, and usage much more extensively than would a dictionary for native English speakers. With the cachet of the Press to promote it, it could take the "Oxford dictionary" brand to readerships that might be intimidated or puzzled by the more magisterial OED.

But the command economy of World War II under which all British publishers were then operating posed a problem: everything was in short supply, and Milford appealed to the British Council for help in getting the paper and cloth. He referred the matter to E.C. Parnwell, who was looking after the Press's overseas projects, Milford being by then too unwell to manage the Press without substantial assistance, as he had been doing since 1904.

Hornby had brought with him the world rights to the book excluding Japan and China; Kenneth Sisam, then Secretary to the Delegates of the Press, gave a favourable report to the Delegates on the book. Milford also used hostility to Japan to push for a subsidy from the British Council, saying that "the Japanese are very cheap producers" and were likely to capture the market.

The book had more than 1,500 pages and for an edition of 10,000 copies would need ten tons of paper. Milford applied for a special release to acquire this paper "in the direct interest of British culture and overseas trade, particularly in the non-sterling areas". He had adequate paper stock to begin the edition but this was all earmarked for "essential reprints" and he could only use it if replacements were guaranteed. Milford's niece, Eleanor M. Booker, was now working at the India Office, and he lobbied for paper through her.

Finally the book came out between 1943 and 1948 and became an instant success. Today it is one of the most used resources by learners of the English language worldwide.

== Publications ==
=== English dictionaries ===
==== Oxford Advanced Learner's Dictionary of Current English ====
Oxford Advanced Learner's Dictionary of Current English was first published in 1948; the current edition is the tenth. The following editions exist:

- First edition first published in 1948 (12 impressions)
- Second edition first published in 1963 (19 impressions)
- Third edition first published in 1974 (28 impressions)

- ISBN 0194311015, 9780194311014

==== Oxford Advanced Learner's Dictionary ====
The book's cover title was changed beginning with 4th edition. However, the old name was still being referenced by foreign language versions of the dictionary up to 6th edition.

- Fourth edition first published in 1989 (50 impressions)

- ISBN 0194311104, 9780194311106

- Fifth edition first published in 1995 (65 impressions)

- CD-ROM edition (1997-05-01, ISBN 0-19-431469-3, 978-0-194-31469-5): includes 63,000 references, 90,000 examples, 65,000 definitions, 11,600 idioms and phrasal verbs, 1700 words illustrated, and 2000 new words and meanings.

- Sixth edition first published in 2000 (117 impressions):

- Oxford University Press edition

- paperback ISBN 0-19-431424-3
- hardback ISBN 0-19-431510-X
- international student's edition, paperback ISBN 0-19-431550-9
- paperback with Genie CD-ROM ISBN 0-19-431585-1, 978-0-194-31585-2 (2002-03-21)

- The Commercial Press (China) edition (牛津高阶英语词典 第六版•英语版) (ISBN 7-100-03919-3): Includes 4500 new words and definitions over the original English publication. Reduced number of letters used in definition from 3500 to 3000.

- ?th impression (2004-01-14)

- Seventh edition first published in 2005 (105 impressions): Includes 183,500 words, short phrases explanations; 85,000 examples, 2,000 new words and definitions, 5,000 encyclopaedic vocabulary, Oxford 3000 commonly used word list, 7000 synonyms and antonyms, 2000 illustrations, 32-page colour illustrations, 96 pages of special topic pages

- Oxford University Press edition

- paperback with Compass CD-ROM ISBN 0-19-431649-1, 978-0-194-31649-1 (2005-02-24)

- The Commercial Press (China) edition (牛津高阶英语词典 第7版) (ISBN 978-7-100-05498-0): 1 revision, 1 impression.

- 1st impression (2007-08-?)
- Revision 1, 1st impression (2013-03-?)

Oxford Advanced Learner's Dictionary 8th Edition CD-ROM

- Eighth edition first published in 2010 (69 impressions): The production had taken 5 years and over 30,000 hours of editing.

- Oxford University Press edition

- with Oxford iWriter ISBN 0-19-479904-2, 978-0-194-79904-1
- English Mac OS X edition: Published by Oxford University Press ELT.

- Version 8.6.946 (): Includes in-app purchase where sample entries from the dictionary are included, News feature (News from Oxford University about product discounts, language learning and teaching blogs, and other relevant matters).
- Version 8.7.21 (OS X 10.9, 2017-01-25)

- Japan Android edition (オックスフォード現代英英辞典 公式アプリ 日本版): Supports Android 2.2. Published by BIGLOBE Inc.
- Japan iOS edition (オックスフォード現代英英辞典 公式アプリ 日本版): Supports iOS 4.3 and above. Published by BIGLOBE Inc.

- Version 1.4 (iOS 8.0, 2016-12-09)

- The Commercial Press (China) edition (牛津高阶英语词典 第8版) (ISBN 978-7-100-08744-5): 3 revisions, 8 impressions.

- 1st impression (2012-06-?)
- Revision 3, 8th impression (2012-12-?)

- Ninth edition first published in 2015 (39 impressions): Includes over 185,000 words, phrases and meanings (with 700+ new words and meanings). Added Express yourself notes, Wordfinder notes. DVD software support Windows 7, Mac OS X 10.6. DVD includes dictionary, British and American English audio, Oxford iSpeaker, Oxford iWriter, topic wordlists, teacher resources (downloadable videos, lesson plans and activities for use in class). Basic online contents includes dictionary, British and American English audio, pictures, word origins, usage notes, Oxford 3000 and Academic Word lists, Oxford Text Checker. Premium Online service includes My Wordlists.

- Oxford University Press edition (Oxford Advanced Learner's Dictionary NEW 9th Edition/Oxford Advanced Learner's Dictionary Ninth Edition)

- paperback + Oxford iSpeaker/Oxford iWriter DVD + Premium Online Access Code (ISBN 978-0-19-479879-2)
- hardback + Oxford iSpeaker/Oxford iWriter DVD + Premium Online Access Code (ISBN 978-0-19-479878-5)
- 1-year Premium Online subscription (ISBN 978-0-19-479888-4)
- iOS edition (ISBN 978-0-19-479889-1)
- CD-ROM edition (ISBN 0-19-479900-X): latter includes many etymologies.
- Android version: Published by Oxford University Press ELT Division. Supports Android 4.0.3. Free download gives 100 sample entries from the OALD 9th edition. Owner of 8th edition Android apps can be upgraded to 9th edition at discount.

- 1.1.3.0 (Android 4.0.3, 2016-09-15)

- Android code version: Published by Oxford University Press ELT Division. It is a version for users from educational institutions.

- 3.5.42 (Android 2.2, 2013-12-30)

- iOS version: Published by Oxford University Press ELT Division. Developed with Paragon Software.

- 2.2.1 (iOS 7.0 demo, 2016-09-14): Free download version includes 100 sample entries from the new OALD 9th edition. English, Russian language support.

- Oxford Fajar Sdn. Bhd. edition (Oxford Advanced Learner's Dictionary NEW 9th Edition/Oxford Advanced Learner's Dictionary Ninth Edition) (ISBN 978-0-19-479880-8)

- 1st? impression (2015-03)

- Obunsha edition (Oxford Advanced Learner's Dictionary New 9th Edition/オックスフォード現代英英辞典 第9版) (2015-09-25, ISBN 978-4-010-75299-9) (with book, Windows 7/Mac OS X 10.6 DVD-ROM containing iSpeaker and iWriter, online access code, DVD installation guide): Includes 185,000 references (700 over previous edition).
- The Commercial Press (China) edition (牛津高阶英语词典 第9版) (ISBN 978-7-100-12356-3): 4 revisions, 8 impressions.

- Revision 4, 8th impression (2016-09-?)

- Foreign Language Limited edition (Oxford Advanced Learner's Dictionary New 9th Edition/옥스포드 영영사전 9th Edition) (2015-09-??, ISBN 978-0-19-479879-2) (with DVD-ROM containing iSpeaker and iWriter):

- 1st impression (2015-09)

- Tenth edition first published 2020.

- Oxford University Press edition

- paperback/app/online pack (ISBN 978-0-19-479848-8)
- hardback/app/online pack (ISBN 978-0-19-479849-5)
- paperback in pack (ISBN 978-0-19-479854-9)
- hardback in pack (ISBN 978-0-19-479855-6)
- app (ISBN 978-0-19-479862-4)
- online access (ISBN 978-0-19-479862-4)
- Android version: Published by Oxford University Press ELT Division.

- 1.0.2984 (2020-03-18)

- iOS version: Published by Oxford University Press ELT Division.

- 1.1 (2020-03-30)

- Oxford University Press Indian edition

- paperback/app/online pack (ISBN 978-0-19-479850-1)
- hardback/app/online pack (ISBN 978-0-19-479851-8)

==== Oxford Advanced Learner's Dictionary of Academic English ====
It is a demo version of Oxford Advanced Learner's Dictionary, which includes 100 sample entries from the OALD.

- Ninth edition

- Android version: Published by Oxford University Press ELT Division.

- 1.0.19.0 (Android 2.2, 2015-09-22)

==== Oxford Learner's Dictionary of Academic English ====
- 9th edition: Includes 22,000 words, phrases and meanings; 50,000 corpus-based example sentences, 690 collocation notes show over 26,000 collocations (words that are used together), 80 Thesaurus notes, Grammar Points and Which Word? notes; 48-page Oxford Academic Writing Tutor; 47-page reference section includes information about academic grammar, as well as punctuation, numbers and measurements. CD-ROM includes Oxford Academic iWriter, 500 extra words and phrases, words spoken in British and American English, iGuide, full range of academic entries via 'Mini Dictionary' mode, Oxford Academic iWriter, practice exercises, PDFs of the Word Lists and a bibliography of all the texts in the Oxford Corpus of Academic English.

- Print+CD-ROM version (ISBN 978-0-19-433350-4):
- Android version (ISBN 978-019-479898-3):
- iOS version (ISBN 978-0-19-479896-9):
- Mac OS X version: Published by Oxford University Press ELT Division. Includes 120 Thesaurus notes, Language Banks, Grammar Points and Which Word? notes; British and American English voices.

- 1.0 (OS X 10.9, 2017-01-31)

==== Oxford Learner's Wordfinder Dictionary ====
- 1st edition: Includes 630 topic words.

- The Commercial Press (Beijing) edition

- Hardback version (牛津英汉双解联想词典（缩印本）) (ISBN 7-100-03904-5)

- 1st impression (2003-12-??)

==== Oxford Learner's Thesaurus: A Dictionary of Synonyms ====
The thesaurus was originated in the Oxford Advanced Learner's Dictionary 7th edition, where over 200 sets of synonyms were located at specific lexical entries.

- 1st edition: Includes 2000 entries, 17000 synonyms and antonyms, 4000 definitions, 17 usage labels, 30 special subjects. Headwords derived from Oxford 3000 entries. CD-ROM supports Windows 2000, Mac OS X 10.4; includes thesaurus, special topic browser, and My Topics where users can create personalized mini-thesaurus, games, exercises, and all the study material from the print dictionary.

- Oxford University Press CD+print edition (ISBN 0-19-475200-3, 978-0-19-475200-8)

- 1st? impression (2008-05-06)
- ?th impression (2014-04-??)

- The Commercial Press edition (OXFORD Learner's Thesaurus a dictionary of synonyms/牛津英语同义词学习词典) (ISBN 978-7-100-07095-9): 4 impressions.

- 1st impression (2010-10-??)
- 4th impression (2015-01-??)

- Android demo edition: Published by Oxford University Press ELT. Free download version includes 100 sample entries from the dictionary.

- 1.0.7.0 (Android 2.2, 2015-12-07)

- Android final edition (ISBN 978-0-19-475209-1): Published by Oxford University Press ELT.

- ? (Android 2.2)

- iOS final edition (ISBN 978-0-19-475207-7): Published by Oxford University Press ELT.

- 1.0 (iOS 7.0, 2014-09-27)
- 1.1 (2015-03-06): Support iPhone 6 and iPhone 6 Plus.

==== Oxford Learner's Pocket Dictionary ====
- 4th edition: Includes over 38,000 words, phrases, and meanings in British and American English.

- paperback edition (ISBN 0-19-439870-6, 978-0-19-439870-1)

- 1st? impression (2008-01-01)

- paperback edition (ISBN 978-0-19-439872-5)

- 1st? impression ()

==== Oxford Learner's Pocket Dictionary of Business English ====
- 1st edition: Includes over 38,000 entries with real examples from a new corpus of Business English, vocabulary from British and American English, 1,000 most important terms are marked with a star.

- paperback edition (ISBN 978-0-19-431733-7)

- 1st? impression ()

==== Oxford Learner's Pocket Grammar ====
- 1st edition: Includes grammar topics in 2-page sections.

- paperback edition (ISBN 0-19-433684-0, 978-0-19-433684-0)

- 1st? impression (2008-05-22)

==== Oxford Learner's Pocket Phrasal Verbs and Idioms ====
- 1st edition: Includes 1,500 phrasal verbs and idioms, 134 units divided into 24 modules in topics such as sport, study, business, social events and home technology; information on style, synonyms, opposites and derivatives, and common word partners.

- paperback edition (ISBN 0-19-432549-0, 978-0-19-432549-3)

- 1st? impression (2013-01-17)

==== Oxford Learner's Pocket Thesaurus ====
- 1st edition: Includes over 25,000 synonyms and antonyms, up to 12 synonyms given for each of 5,000 key words.

- Paperback version (ISBN 0-19-475204-6, 978-0-19-475204-6)

- 1st? impression (2010-05-13)

- Counterpack version (includes 5 copies of the Pocket Thesaurus)

- ?th impression ()

==== Oxford Learner's Pocket Verbs and Tenses ====
- 1st edition: Includes 110 units are divided into 14 sections.

- paperback edition (ISBN 0-19-432569-5, 978-0-19-432569-1)

- 1st? impression (2013-02-28)

==== Oxford Learner's Pocket Word Skills ====
- 1st edition: Includes over 3,500 key words and phrases, 180 topics including the news, technology and the environment.

- paperback edition (ISBN 0-19-462014-X, 978-0-19-462014-7)

- 1st? impression (2011-12-22)

==== Oxford Learner's Quick Reference Grammar ====
- Android version (ISBN 978-0-19-450280-1): Includes 181 topics, over 2000 examples.

- Version 1.1.10.0 (Android 4.0.3, 2016-08-31)

- iOS 9th edition (ISBN 978-0-19-450278-8): Includes 181 topics, over 2000 examples. Supports iOS 7.0 or later.

==== New Oxford Intermediate Learner's Dictionary ====
- 1st? edition: Authored by Miranda Steel

- Paperback edition (ISBN 0-19-431540-1, 978-019-431540-1): Published by Oxford University Press.

- 1st? impression (2000-??-??).
- 2nd? impression (2001-??-??).

==== Oxford Advanced American Dictionary for learners of English ====
- 8th edition: Includes 145,000 words, phrases and meanings; 85,500 examples, 64 Reference pages including a 26-page Oxford Writing Tutor, over 1000 colour illustrations. CD-ROM includes iWriter, contents from printed dictionary, voice recording, Topic Dictionary, searchable picture dictionary, pop-up Genie software integration. CD-ROM supports Windows XP-7, Macintosh OS X 10.4.

- Paperback+CD-ROM version (ISBN 0-19-439966-4, 978-0-19-439966-1): Published by Oxford University Press.

- 1st impression (2011-03-25)

- iOS version: Published by Oxford University Press ELT.

- 1.0 (iOS 4.0, 2011-07-28)

==== Oxford Basic American Dictionary for learners of English ====
- New edition: Includes 27,000 words, phrases and meanings; 15,000 examples, 25 Reference pages, over 500 colour illustrations, 2000 keywords from Oxford 3000 keywords. CD-ROM includes contents from printed dictionary, Topic Dictionary, searchable picture dictionary, pop-up Genie software integration. CD-ROM supports Windows XP-7, Macintosh OS X 10.4.

- Paperback+CD-ROM version (ISBN 0-19-439969-9, 978-0-19-439969-2): Published by Oxford University Press.

- 1st impression (2011-01-15)

==== Oxford American Dictionary for learners of English ====
- 1st edition: Includes 42,000 words, phrases and meanings; 35,000 examples, 45 Reference pages including a 16-page Oxford Writing Tutor, 650 colour illustrations. CD-ROM includes iWriter, contents from printed dictionary, voice recording, Topic Dictionary, searchable picture dictionary, pop-up Genie software integration. CD-ROM supports Windows XP-7, Macintosh OS X 10.4.

- Paperback+CD-ROM version (ISBN 978-0-19-439972-2): Published by Oxford University Press.

- 1st impression (2010-12-12)

==== Oxford ESL Dictionary ====
- 1st edition: Includes over 40,000 entries with over 1,000 illustrated words, over 30,000 examples.

- paperback edition (ISBN 0-19-431683-1, 978-019-431683-5)

- 1st? impression (2004-06-30)

==== Oxford ESL Dictionary for learners of English ====
- 2nd edition (Oxford ESL Dictionary for learners of English new edition With Canadian content/Oxford ESL Dictionary Pack: for learners of English): Canadian version of Oxford American Dictionary for learners of English?. Includes 42,000 words, phrases and meanings; 35,000 examples, 45 Reference pages including a 16-page Oxford Writing Tutor, 650 colour illustrations. CD-ROM includes iWriter, contents from printed dictionary, voice recording, Topic Dictionary, searchable picture dictionary, pop-up Genie software integration.

- Paperback+CD-ROM version (ISBN 0-19-439414-X, 978-0-19-439414-7): Published by Oxford University Press.

- 1st impression (2012-04-30)

=== English-Chinese dictionaries ===
==== The Advanced Learner's Dictionary of Current English with Chinese Translation ====
- 2nd? edition (現代高級英漢雙解辭典/现代高级英汉双解辞典): Published by The Commercial Press and Oxford University Press for Kuala Lumpur, Singapore, Hong Kong.

- ?th impression (1970-??-??)

==== The Oxford Advanced Learner's Dictionary of Current English ====
- 2nd edition (牛津高級英英英漢雙解辭典): Published by Tung Hua Book Co., Ltd. in Taiwan. Based on English OALD 2nd edition.

- ?th impression (ISBN 978-957-636-479-2) (1978-11)

==== Oxford Advanced Learner's Dictionary of Current English ====
- 3rd edition (牛津高級英英英漢雙解辭典) (ISBN 957-636-400-0): Published by Tung Hua Book Co., Ltd. in Taiwan.

- ?th impression (1984)
- ?th impression (ISBN 957-636-050-1, 978-957-636-050-3) (1989)
- paperback/hardcover? edition (ISBN 957-636-152-4, 978-957-636-152-4)

- ?th impression (1990?/1993-02-17)

- Hardcover/paperback? edition (ISBN 957-636-400-0, 978-957-636-400-6)

- ?th impression (1982?/1993-02-17)

- 6th edition (Oxford Advanced Learner's Dictionary of Current English Revised and updated/牛津高級英英英漢雙解辭典革新版): Published by Tung Hua Book Co., Ltd. in Taiwan.

- ?th impression (ISBN 957-636-416-7, 978-957-636-416-7) (1995-08-01(1995-01-08?))
- ?th impression (ISBN 957-636-152-4, 978-957-636-152-4) (1997-05-01(1997-01-05?)/1990?)

- 4th edition (牛津高級英英英漢雙解辭典) (ISBN 957-636-400-0)

- 6th edition (1989-09), 6th edition 7th impression (2000-10)

==== Oxford Advanced Learner's Dictionary of Current English with Chinese Translation ====
- 3rd Traditional Chinese edition (牛津現代高級英漢雙解辭典) (ISBN 978-7-100-00636-1):

- ?th impression (1988-??-??)
- ?th impression (1995-??-??)

- 3rd Simplified Chinese by The Commercial Press in China (牛津现代高级英汉双解词典（简化汉字本）) (ISBN 0-19-583409-7, 978-0-19-583409-3): Based on the English OALD 3rd Edition.

- ?th impression (1988-05)
- ?th impression (1995)

==== Oxford English-Chinese Reader's Dictionary ====
- 3rd edition ()

- Traditional Chinese (牛津英漢雙解辭典): Published by Oxford University Press and sold by Chuanwushufang.

- ?th impression (1981)

- 3rd edition

- Traditional Chinese (牛津英漢雙解辭典) (ISBN 0-195-83703-7, 978-0-195-83703-2): Published by Crane Publishing Co., Ltd. Based on the English OALD 3rd Edition. Edited by Lin Lianchang.

- ?th impression (1982)
- ?th impression (1986-01-01)

==== Oxford Advanced Learner's English-Chinese Dictionary ====
Simplified Chinese versions of Oxford Advanced Learner's English-Chinese Dictionary (牛津高阶英汉双解词典/牛津高階英漢雙解詞典) has been published by The Commercial Press since 1988. Traditional Chinese version has been published by Oxford University Press (China) Ltd. since 4th edition.

- Revised 3rd Edition (Oxford Advanced Learner's English-Chinese Dictionary Revised Third Edition)

- Traditional Chinese (牛津現代高級英漢雙解辭典第三版)

- hardcover (ISBN 0-19-583768-1, 978-0-19-583768-1)

- 1st impression (1984)
- 13th impression (1988). colour illustrations are introduced in this version.

- paperback

- 4th Edition (Oxford Advanced Learner's English-Chinese Dictionary Fourth edition): Based on the English OALD 4th Edition.

- Traditional Chinese (牛津高階英漢雙解詞典第四版) (1994)

- Paperback edition (ISBN 0-19-585603-1, 978-0-19-585603-3)

- 1st? impression (1995-??)

- Simplified Chinese (牛津高阶英汉双解词典第四版) (ISBN 978-7-100-02195-1, 7-100-02195-2, 1997-08):

- Extended 4th Edition (Oxford Advanced Learner's English-Chinese Dictionary Extended fourth Edition): Based on the OALECD 4th Edition published in 1994. Main dictionary includes 57000 head words, 81500 examples, 12720 phrases and clauses. Supplement includes 3000 head words, IPA, 240 remarks. Total entries include 60000 head words with 6500 new entries, 83100 examples with 12800 new idioms and phrases, 200 new special topics, 1820 new illustrations.

- Simplified Chinese (牛津高阶英汉双解词典第四版增补本) (ISBN 7-100-03415-9, 978-7-100-03415-9)

- 1st impression: (2001/2002-01-01?)
- last impression: (2002-04-01)

- 5th Edition (牛津高阶英汉双解词典第5版)
- 6th Edition (牛津高阶英汉双解词典第6版): Based on the English OALD 6th Edition. Includes over 80000 head words, over 90000 examples, 40 inset pages, 1700 pictures. Uses under 3000 commonly used words for explanations.

- Traditional Chinese

- condensed print (2001-04)
- hardback? (2004-04)

- Traditional Chinese large print with English Synchronization Drill CD-ROM Version 1.2 (牛津高階英漢雙解詞典第6版大字本)
- Simplified Chinese (牛津高阶英汉双解词典第6版): Published by The Commercial Press (Beijing).

- hardback (2004-08)
- Simplified Chinese condensed print (牛津高阶英汉双解词典(缩印本)第6版):

- 1st impression (2005-04)
- last impression (2006-05)

- Simplified Chinese (2007-04)

- 7th Edition (牛津高階英漢雙解詞典第7版/牛津高阶英汉双解词典第7版): Includes over 183500 words (2000 new words), phrases, and explanations (5000 specialized terms in grammar, industries, commerce, technology; 700 world phrases, 2600 cultural words, 2000 words with picture examples); 85000 bilingual examples, 400 usage examples, 130 usage pages, 44 colour pages.

- Traditional Chinese: Published by Oxford University Press (China).

- hardback with Genie DVD-ROM (ISBN 978-0-19-549827-1, 2008-01-15)
- paperback with Genie DVD-ROM (ISBN 0-19-545612-2, 978-0-19-545612-7)
- hardcover (ISBN 0-19-545996-2, 978-0-19-545996-8)

- 1st? impression (2008-??)

- paperback (ISBN 0-19-545997-0, 978-0-19-545997-5)

- 1st? impression (2008-??)

- Traditional Chinese (2008-03)
- large print (ISBN 0-19-545998-9, 978-0-19-545998-2)

- 1st? impression (2008-06)

- iOS edition (Oxford Advanced Learner's English-Chinese Dictionary (7th edition)/牛津高階英漢雙解詞典（第七版）/牛津高阶英汉双解词典第7版): Includes Simplified Chinese, Traditional Chinese, English versions.

- 1.0.0 (2012-07-11)
- 1.1 (iOS 6, 2012-11-11)
- 1.2 (2013-06-30)
- 1.3.0 (2014-03-06): Supports iOS 7 enhanced UI.
- 1.3.1 (2014-03-23)
- 1.4 (2014-11-06)
- 1.4.1 (2014-11-12)
- 1.4.2 (2015-01-04)
- 1.5 (iOS 7, 2015-05-21)
- 1.6 (iOS 8, 2017-07-11): 64-bit compatibility.
- 1.6.1 (iOS 8, 2017-07-23)

- Simplified Chinese by Oxford Fajar Sdn. Bhd./Oxford University Press (China) Ltd. (Oxford Advanced Learner's English-Chinese Dictionary 7th Edition Simplified characters/牛津高阶英汉双解词典第7版简体字本)

- Paperback? edition (ISBN 978-019-800362-5)

- 1st? impression (2009-04-??)

- Simplified Chinese by The Commercial Press (Beijing)

- hard cover (ISBN 978-7-100-06253-4): 3 revisions, 120 impressions.

- 1st impression (2009-04)
- last impression (2013-08)

- condensed print (牛津高阶英汉双解词典(缩印本)第7版/牛津高阶英汉双解词典(第七版•缩印本)) (ISBN 7-100-06701-4, 978-7-100-06701-0) (2009-07): 3 revisions, 9? impressions.

- 1st impression (2009-07)
- 10th impression (2010-04)

- soft cover (ISBN 978-7-100-06706-5): 3 revisions, 4 impressions.

- 1st impression (2009-11)
- last impression (2013-03)

- large print (牛津高阶英汉双解词典(大字本)第7版) (ISBN 978-7-100-06708-9): 3 revisions, 4 impressions.

- 1st impression (2010-01)
- last impression (2013-06)

- iOS edition (牛津高阶英汉双解词典(第7版)): Published by The Commercial Press (Beijing), Ltd. Supports iOS 6.1 or above. Includes Simplified Chinese, English versions.

- 1.0.1 (iOS 6.1, 2014-02-26)

- 8th Edition: Includes 184500 words, phrases, explanations (with 1000 new words and definitions); 49 writing guides in 14 categories, 78 expanded picture pages, 28 professional academic phrases, 68 pages of reference messages, 8 categories of usage examples, Oxford iWriter composition software CD, over 2,600 pages. It was published as part of 35th anniversary of cooperation between The Commercial Press and Oxford. CD supports Windows XP or above, includes iWriter.

- Traditional Chinese (牛津高階英漢雙解詞典第8版) (2013-07): Published by Oxford University Press (China).

- Paperback edition (ISBN 0-19-396634-4, 978-0-19-396634-5)

- ?th impression (2013-02-??/2013-03-??/2013-04-15)

- CD+Paperback edition (ISBN 0-19-398612-4, 978-0-19-398612-1)

- ?th impression (2013-06-15/2013-07-01)

- Softback condensed print edition (ISBN 0-19-396635-2, 978-0-19-396635-2)

- ?th impression (2013-06-15)

- CD edition (Oxford Advanced Learner's English-Chinese Dictionary (Eighth edition) CD/牛津高階英漢雙解詞典（第八版）光碟) (ISBN 978-0-19-398613-8):

- 1st? impression (2013-06-15?/2013-06-24)

- iOS edition (Oxford Advanced Learner's English-Chinese Dictionary/牛津高階英漢雙解詞典): Includes Simplified Chinese, Traditional Chinese, English versions. Support cross-searching with Oxford Business English Dictionary (Second edition) (English-Chinese edition).

- 1.0 (2015-06-26)
- 1.1 (2015-09-01)
- 1.2 (2016-02-04)
- 1.3 (2016-03-08)
- 1.4 (2016-07-05): Updated dictionary contents.
- 1.4.1 (iOS 8.0, 2016-07-15)
- 1.5 (2017-02-07): Updated dictionary contents.
- 1.5.1 (2017-03-30)
- 1.6 (2017-08-26)
- 1.7 (2017-12-14): Updated dictionary contents. Supports 5.8-inch screen devices.
- 1.7.1 (2018-01-02)

- Simplified Chinese

- Hardback+CD edition (牛津高阶英汉双解词典第8版) (ISBN 978-7-100-10527-9): 1 revision, 1 impression.

- 1st impression (2014-06-01)

- Softback condensed print edition (牛津高阶英汉双解词典（缩印本）第8版) (ISBN 978-7-100-10662-7): 18 impressions.

- 1st impression (2014-12-??)
- 18th impression (2015-03-??)

- Softback large print edition (牛津高阶英汉双解词典第8版) (ISBN 978-7-100-11096-9): 1 impression.

- 1st impression (2015-06-??)

- Hardback large print edition (牛津高阶英汉双解词典第8版大字本) (ISBN 978-7-100-11095-2):

- 1st impression (2016-01-??)
- 5th impression (2016-01-??)

- iOS edition (牛津高阶英汉双解词典(第8版)): Published by The Commercial Press (Beijing), Ltd.

- 1.0 (2015-08-06)
- 1.1 (iOS 8?-9, 2015-09-20): Added support of iOS 9.
- 1.2 (2015-12-14)
- 1.3 (iOS 8.0, 2016-09-23)
- 1.4 (2017-04-17)
- 1.5 (iOS 9.0, 2018-01-04): Supports iPhone X.

- 9th Edition (Oxford Advanced Learner's English-Chinese Dictionary Ninth edition): Includes over 185000 words, phrases, explanations (with 700 new words and definitions, over 6000 revisions); 52 pages writing guides, 16 pages oral language guides, 74 pages illustrations. New section includes Oxford Speaking Tutor, Express Yourself subsection, Wordfinder. DVD-ROM includes iWriter and iSpeaker. DVD supports Windows 7, 8, 10.

- Traditional Chinese (牛津高階英漢雙解詞典（第九版）/牛津高階英漢雙解詞典第9版): Published by Oxford University Press (China) Ltd.

- Paperback+DVD edition (978-0-19-942936-3):

- 1st impression (2018-05-01 (publication/2018-06-25 (release))

- Simplified Chinese (Niújīn Gāojiē Yīnghàn Shuāngjiĕ Cídiǎn/牛津高阶英汉双解词典第9版/牛津高阶英汉双解词典(第九版)): Published by The Commercial Press (Beijing), Ltd.

- Hardback+DVD edition (ISBN 978-7-100-15860-2, 7-100-15860-5):

- 1st impression (2018-03-01)
- 180th impression (2018-06)

==== Oxford Elementary Learner's English-Chinese Dictionary ====
Oxford Elementary Learner's English-Chinese Dictionary (牛津初階英漢雙解詞典) is targeted for primary school readers. It was first published in 1998.

- 1st edition:

- Simplified Chinese edition (Niújīn Chūjiē Yīnghàn Shuāngjiĕ Cǐdiǎn/牛津初阶英汉双解词典): Published by The Commercial Press (Beijing).

- Paperback edition

- 1st? impression (1999-06-??)

- Second edition: Includes 15,000 entries, 32 pages of colour illustrations.

- Simplified Chinese edition (Niújīn Chūjiē Yīnghàn Shuāngjiĕ Cǐdiǎn/牛津初阶英汉双解词典（第二版）): Published by The Commercial Press (Beijing).

- Paperback edition (ISBN 978-7-100-02863-9)

- Beijing 36th impression (2009-05-??)
- last? impression (2011-07-??)

- 3rd edition: Includes 19,000 British and American entries, 13,000 examples, 620 usages for grammar, spelling, and writing usages; 16 pages of illustrations covering 400 entries, 20 study pages. CD-ROM includes English pronunciation guide.

- Traditional Chinese edition (牛津初階英漢雙解詞典（第三版）): Published by Oxford University Press (China) Ltd.

- Paperback with pronunciation CD-ROM (ISBN 0-195-49467-9, 978-0-195-49467-9):

- 1st? impression (2009-09-??)
- ?th impression (2010-11-15)

- Softback condensed print edition with pronunciation CD-ROM (ISBN 978-0-195-49469-3):

- 1st? impression (2009-09-??)

- Oxford University Press (China) Ltd. Simplified Chinese edition (Oxford Fajar Oxford Elementary Learner's English-Chinese Dictionary 3rd Edition Simplified characters/牛津初阶英汉双解词典（第3版）简体字本)

- Paperback? edition (ISBN 978-0-19-396691-8)

- The Commercial Press (Beijing) Simplified Chinese edition (Niújīn Chūjiē Yīnghàn Shuāngjiĕ Cǐdiǎn/牛津初阶英汉双解词典（第3版）)

- Paperback edition (ISBN 978-7-100-07582-4)

- 1st? impression (2011-07-01)
- Beijing 43th impression (2013-08-??)

==== Oxford Intermediate Learner's English-Chinese Dictionary ====
Oxford Intermediate Learner's English-Chinese Dictionary (牛津進階英漢雙解詞典/牛津中階英漢雙解詞典) is targeted for secondary school readers. It was first published in 2001.

- 1st edition: Includes over 30,000 headwords and phrases, over 30,000 examples, 3050 idioms and phrasal verbs, 1500 comments, usage examples for 3500 English words, 200 illustrations, 52 colour classified pages, 7 pages of world maps.

- Simplified Chinese edition (Niújīn Zhōngjiē Yīnghàn Shuāngjiĕ Cǐdiǎn/牛津中阶英汉双解词典): Published by The Commercial Press (Beijing).

- Hard cover edition (ISBN 978-7-100-02973-5)

1st? impression (2001-12-??)

- third edition: Includes over 47,000 headwords and phrases with 4000 specialist terms, 3500 idioms and phrasal verbs, over 34,000 examples, 650 usage examples, over 200 illustrations covering over 2000 terms, 64 study pages. CD-ROM includes English pronunciations.

- Traditional Chinese edition (牛津進階英漢雙解詞典（第三版）): Published by Oxford University Press (China) Ltd.

- Paperback+CD edition (ISBN 0-19-592885-7)

1st? impression (2006-02-02)

- Simplified Chinese edition (Niújīn Zhōngjiē Yīnghàn Shuāngjiĕ Cǐdiǎn/牛津中阶英汉双解词典（第3版）): Published by The Commercial Press (Beijing).

- Paperback? edition (ISBN 7-100-04343-3)

1st? impression (2001-06-01)

- 4th edition: Includes 1000(3000?) new words and phrases for total of 50,000, 6000 new examples for total of 40,000, 2,600 idioms, 1,400 phrasal verbs, 160 new illustrations for total of 400 covering 2500 words, 400 new usage examples for total of over 1000, 80 pages of usage appendices. CD-ROM includes Intermediate iWriter, covering 11 types of compositions.

- Traditional Chinese edition (牛津進階英漢雙解詞典（第4版）): Published by Oxford University Press (China) Ltd.

- Paperback edition with CD-ROM (ISBN 0-19-548957-8, 978-0-19-548957-6)

1st? impression (2016-09-01)

- Simplified Chinese edition (Niújīn Zhōngjiē Yīnghàn Shuāngjiĕ Cǐdiǎn/牛津中阶英汉双解词典（第4版）): Published by The Commercial Press (Beijing).

- Hard cover edition (ISBN 978-7-100-06747-8)

- 1st? impression (2010-07-??)

- 5th edition: Includes 111,000 words, definitions, phrases, derivative words; illustrations cover 1200 entries. CD-ROM includes Intermediate iWriter, covering 11 types of compositions.

- Traditional Chinese edition (牛津進階英漢雙解詞典（第五版）): Published by Oxford University Press (China) Ltd.

- Paperback condensed print edition with CD-ROM (ISBN 978-0-19-943213-4)

1st? impression (2016-09-01)

- Paperback edition with CD-ROM (ISBN 0-19-943214-7, 978-0-19-943214-1)

1st? impression (2016-09-01)

- Simplified Chinese edition (Niújīn Zhōngjiē Yīnghàn Shuāngjiĕ Cǐdiǎn/牛津中阶英汉双解词典（第5版）): Published by The Commercial Press (Beijing).

- Hard cover edition (ISBN 978-7-100-12242-9)

1st? impression (2016-07-01)

==== Oxford Learner's Wordfinder English-Chinese Dictionary ====
- 1st edition

- Simplified Chinese version by The Commercial Press (Beijing)

- Softback condensed print (牛津英汉双解联想词典（缩印本）) (ISBN 978-7-100-04302-1)

- 1st impression (2005-12-??)

- Softback condensed print (牛津英汉双解联想词典（缩印本）) (ISBN 978-7-100-06249-7)

- 1st impression (2009-06-??)

==== Oxford Learner's Thesaurus A dictionary of synonyms ====
- 1st edition: Based on the English OLT 1st edition.

- Traditional Chinese version (牛津英語同義詞學習詞典（英漢雙解版）): Published by Oxford University Press (China) Ltd.

- paperback edition (ISBN 0-19-801694-8, 978-0-19-801694-6)

- 1st? impression (2012-06-??)

- Simplified Chinese version by The Commercial Press (Beijing)

- standard edition (牛津英语同义词学习词典英汉双解版) (ISBN 978-7-100-10526-2): 1 revision, 1 impression.

1st impression (2014-04-??)

- large print edition (牛津英语同义词学习词典英汉双解版) (ISBN 978-7-100-09707-9): 1 revision, 1 impression.

- 1st impression (2013-08-??/2013-10-??)

==== Oxford American Dictionary for learners of English (English-Chinese) ====
- 1st edition: Includes 42000 words, phrases, definitions; 35000 examples, 300 usage frames, 650 colour illustrations, 36 pages writing guides, 16 pages writing assistant, Oxford 3000 keywords. CD-ROM includes iWriter.

- Simplified Chinese version by The Commercial Press (Beijing) (牛津美式英语词典（英汉双解）): Printed by Zhone Ke Printing in Beijing.

- Hardback edition (ISBN 978-7-100-11326-7): 1 impression.

- 1st impression (2015-08-01)

=== English-French dictionaries ===
==== Dictionnaire Oxford Poche pour apprendre l'anglais (français-anglais / anglais-français) ====
- 1st edition:

- Paperback edition (ISBN 0-19-431528-2, 978-0-19-431528-9)

- 1st? impression (2006-03-02)

=== English-Greek dictionaries ===
==== Oxford English-Greek Learner's Dictionary ====
- 1st edition:

- hardback edition (ISBN 0-19-431242-9, 978-0-19-431242-4)

- 1st? impression (1999-01-01)

- 2nd edition:

- hardback edition (ISBN 978-0-19-432567-7)

- 1st? impression (2007-12-20)

==== Oxford Greek-English Learner's Dictionary ====
- Revised edition:

- hardback edition (ISBN 978-0-19-432568-4)

- 1st? impression (2008-07-15)

==== Oxford Learner's Pocket Dictionary (English-Greek / Greek-English) ====
- 4th edition: Includes 60000 headwords in both parts.

- paperback edition (ISBN 978-0-19-431279-0)

- 1st? impression (1990-??-??)

=== English-Korean dictionaries ===
- Oxford Advanced Learner's English-Korean Dictionary (옥스포드 영한사전): Published by Foreign Language Limited.

- ? edition: Based on English OALD 7th edition by Sally Wehmeier.

- ISBN 0-19-400114-8, 978-0-19-400114-4 (softback with hard case, 2009-03-01)
- ? (paperback(vinyl?), 2009-01-01)

=== English-English-Persian dictionaries ===
==== Oxford Elementary Learner's Dictionary ====
- 1st? edition: Includes 19,000 words, phrases and meanings and identifies, with 2,000 key English words listed as most important; 500 notes.

- Paperback edition (ISBN 0-19-431630-0, 978-0-19-431630-9)

- 1st impression (2011-??-??)

=== English-Portuguese Dictionaries ===
==== Dicionário Oxford Escolar para estudantes brasileiros de inglês (Português-Inglês / Inglês-Português) ====
- 2nd edition: Includes Acordo Ortográfico da Língua Portuguesa spelling changes. Includes over 68,000 words, phrases, and examples; 78,000 translations, full-colour photo pages, usage notes.

- iOS edition (ISBN 0-19-433151-2, 978-0-19-433151-7)
- Paperback edition (ISBN 0-19-441950-9, 978-0-19-441950-5)

- 1st? impression (2009-09-17)

==== Dicionário Oxford Pocket para estudantes de Inglês (Português-Inglês / Inglês-Português) ====
- 2nd edition: Includes Acordo Ortográfico da Língua Portuguesa spelling changes. CD-ROM includes the full text of the dictionary, extra illustrations, and the Oxford Wordfinder dictionary to build and extend vocabulary.

- Paperback+CD-ROM edition (ISBN 0-19-430124-9, 978-0-19-430124-4)

- 1st? impression (2009-12-17)

=== English-Spanish Dictionaries ===
==== Diccionario Oxford Escolar para estudiantes mexicanos de inglés (español-inglés / inglés-español) ====
- 2nd edition

- Paperback edition (ISBN 0-19-430897-9, 978-0-19-430897-7):

- 1st? impression (2009-03-15)

==== Diccionario Oxford Escolar para estudiantes de inglés (español-inglés / inglés-español) ====
- 1st edition

- Paperback edition (ISBN 0-19-431539-8, 978-0-19-431539-5):

- 1st? impression (2001-06-07)

- 2nd edition

- Paperback edition (ISBN 0-19-430898-7, 978-0-19-430898-4):

- 1st? impression (2009-01-01)

==== Diccionario Oxford Pocket para estudiantes de inglés ====
- 4th edition: Includes 69,000 words, expressions and examples with 700 new words, phrases, and translations; over 30 new usage notes, 24-page full-colour Photo Dictionary, new 'I can talk about...' pages, new communication section. CD-ROM includes pronunciation of all English headwords in British and American English, a Topic Dictionary for vocabulary building (62 topics), a Picture Dictionary with hundreds of illustrations (including videos), interactive exercises, Genie instant look-up facility. App version supports real voice (not text to speech) audio, screen customization via My View.

- Android version (ISBN 978-0-19-441933-8):
- iOS edition (ISBN 978-0-19-441932-1): Published by Oxford University Press ELT.

- Version 1.3 (iOS 7.0, 2014-10-17): iOS 6 support was dropped.

- Print+CD-ROM version (ISBN 978-0-19-441927-7):

- ?th impression (2011-??-??)

==== Diccionario Oxford Pocket para estudiantes latinoamericanos de inglés ====
- 1st edition: Includes 72,000 words, expressions and examples; over 61,000 translations, 700 usage notes on grammar, culture, and difficult or confusing words and phrases; 'I can talk about...' pages, communication section, study pages. Vocabulary includes words, phrases, and translations in modern Latin American Spanish and American and British English. CD-ROM includes the full text of the dictionary, pronunciation of all English headwords in American and British English, a Topic Dictionary, a Picture Dictionary, exercises, games, the Genie instant look-up facility, iGuide, voice recorder.

- Paperback+CD-ROM edition (ISBN 0-19-433733-2, 978-0-19-433733-5):

- 1st? impression (2013-10-31)

=== English-English-Vietnamese Dictionaries ===
==== Oxford Advanced Learner's Dictionary with Vietnamese Translation ====
- 8th edition (Từ điển song ngữ Anh-Việt OALD 8th ED): Based on English OALD 8th edition. Translation was led by Associate Professor Dr. Dinh Dien, edited by Fulbright scholar Tran Manh Quang, reviewed and introduced by Professor Dr. Nguyen Van Hiep, head of the Institute of Linguistics. Published by Tre Publishing House.

- Hardback edition (ISBN 978-6-04-105542-1)

- 1st? impression (2014-01)

- Paperback edition (ISBN 978-6-04-105542-1)

- 1st? impression (2015-03)

== Student's Dictionary ==
In contrast to the Oxford's learner dictionaries, which are designed for learning foreign languages (English in the case of OALD), Oxford Student's Dictionary is designed for learners using English to study other subjects. Oxford Student's Dictionary has smaller vocabulary than the OALD counterpart.

== Literary references ==
- Elvira Dones's 2007 novel (translated into English from Italian in 2014) Sworn Virgin is partly set in Albania. Dones describes the protagonist, Hana, in the following terms:

She feels lost.
She takes it out on her English dictionary with its blue, black, and yellow jacket. It's called Hornby. Mr Hornby thinks he's so great that he can teach you a language. She wonders whether the gentleman is still alive. Is he sad? Lonely? Ugly? She imagines him to be thin and bespectacled, not good-looking. With a pencil she scratches a picture of the imaginary Mr Hornby on the book jacket.
'Serves you right,' she says rancorously.
