= Longman Dictionary of Contemporary English =

Advanced learner's dictionary

LDOCE 4th ed.

The Longman Dictionary of Contemporary English (LDOCE), first published by Longman in 1978, is an advanced learner's dictionary, providing definitions using a restricted vocabulary, helping non-native English speakers understand meanings easily. It is available in four configurations:

- Printed book
- Premium online access
- Printed book plus premium online access
- Reduced online version with no access charge (called "free" but technically "gratis": the license is still proprietary)

The dictionary is currently in its sixth edition. The premium website was revised in 2014 and 2015. It now offers over a million corpus examples (exceeding the paper version's), and includes sound files for every word, 88,000 example sentences, and various tools for study, teaching, examinations and grammar. The 9000 Most Important English Words to Learn have been highlighted via the Longman Communication 9000.

The free online version was updated in 2008 and offers search (with spelling assistance), definitions, collocations, and many examples and illustrations.

== Longman Defining Vocabulary ==
A key feature of the LDOCE is its utilization of the Longman Defining Vocabulary, a 2200-word controlled defining vocabulary used to write all of the definitions in the dictionary. This defining vocabulary was developed from Michael West's General Service List of high-frequency words and their most common meanings.

The controlled defining vocabulary is not only helpful to second-language learners, but has also facilitated the use of the LDOCE as a machine-readable dictionary in computational linguistics research.

== Longman Collocations Dictionary and Thesaurus ==
It is a version of LDOCE specialized for collocations, synonyms, antonyms, designed for intermediate to advanced level learners.

== Publications ==
=== Longman Dictionary of Contemporary English ===
==== English dictionaries ====
===== LDOCE by Pearson English Language Teaching =====
- 6th edition (Longman Dictionary of Contemporary English 6th Edition): Includes 230,000 words, phrases, and meanings; 165,000 corpus-based example sentences, Longman 9,000 keywords, 65,000 collocations (extra 147,000 online), online access for print dictionary.
  - Paperback bi-colour edition+12 months online subscription (ISBN 978-144795420-0)
    - 1st? impression (2014-07-04)

===== Longman Handy Learner's Dictionary of American English =====
- 2nd? edition: Includes 28,000 words and phrases.

==== English-Chinese dictionaries ====
===== LDOCE by Longman =====
- Third edition: Includes 80,000 entries, over 200 usage topics, 24 pages of coloured illustrations, 3,000 popular keywords, 20 Language Notes, over 150 new usage frequency tables, new IELTS vocabulary table. Optical disc includes only new contents not found in the printed LDOCE dictionary.
  - Traditional Chinese version (Longman Dictionary of Contemporary English (English-Chinese) Third Edition/朗文當代高級辭典(英英・英漢雙解)第三版)
    - Paperback edition+disc (ISBN 978-962005271-2)
      - 1st? impression (2004-10-30)

===== LDOCE by Pearson English Language Teaching (Asia) =====
- 4th edition: Includes 207,000 words, phrases, and meanings (including 4000 new words); 155,000 usage examples, 7,000 synonyms and antonyms, over 250 usage topics, 14 pages of coloured illustrations, 3,000 popular keywords, Language Notes. Definitions use only 2000 common words. Optical disc includes contents from LDOCE and Longman Concise Chinese-English Dictionary.
  - Traditional Chinese version (Longman Dictionary of Contemporary English (English-Chinese) 4th Edition/朗文當代高級辭典(英英・英漢雙解)第四版)
    - Hardcover edition+disc (ISBN 978-962005843-1)
      - 1st? impression (2010-01-28)
    - Hardcover condensed print edition+disc (ISBN 978-962005841-7)
      - 1st? impression (2009-09-03)
- 5th edition:
  - Traditional Chinese version (Longman Dictionary of Contemporary English (English-Chinese) 5th Edition/朗文當代高級英漢雙解辭典第五版)
    - Hardcover edition with DVD (ISBN 988009240-6/ISBN 978-9-88009240-4)
      - 1st? impression (2013-08-12)
    - Hardcover condensed print edition with DVD (ISBN 988009241-4/ISBN 978-9-88009241-1)
      - 1st? impression (2013-08-12)

===== Longman Advanced American Dictionary by Foreign Language Teaching and Research Press =====
- New edition: Includes 185,000 words, phrases, definitions (including 6000 new encyclopaedic entries); 73,000 examples, over 1,000 word analyses, grammar hints, vocabulary choices, oral phrases, composition hints.
  - Simplified Chinese version
    - Hardcover edition (Longman Advanced American Dictionary new edition/新版朗文當代高階英漢雙解詞典) (ISBN 978-756008420-6)
      - 1st? impression (2013-08-01)

===== LDOCE by Foreign Language Teaching and Research Press =====
- 4th edition
  - Simplified Chinese version
    - Hardcover edition+disc (Longman Dictionary of Contemporary English/朗文當代高級英語辭典(英英‧英漢雙解)第4版) (ISBN 978-756008420-6)
      - 1st? impression (2009-12-01)
    - Hardcover large print edition+disc (Longman Dictionary of Contemporary English/朗文當代高級英語辭典(英英‧英漢雙解)第4版(大字版)) (ISBN 978-756008487-9)
      - 1st? impression (2010-02-01)
    - Hardcover condensed print edition (Longman Dictionary of Contemporary English 4th Edition/朗文當代高級英語辭典(英英‧英漢雙解)) (ISBN 978-756008604-0)
      - 1st? impression (2009-06-01)
    - Paperback condensed print edition (Longman Dictionary of Contemporary English/朗文當代高級英語辭典(英英‧英漢雙解)第4版(縮印版)) (ISBN 978-756008501-2)
      - 1st? impression (2010-07-01)
- 5th edition
  - Simplified Chinese version (Longman Dictionary of Contemporary English 5th Edition/朗文當代高級英語辭典(英英‧英漢雙解)第5版)
    - Softcover edition (ISBN 978-751354413-9)
      - 1st? impression (2014-08-01)
    - Hardcover edition (ISBN 978-751354210-4)
      - 1st? impression (2014-05-01)
    - Hardcover large print edition+DVD (ISBN 978-751354980-6)
      - 1st? impression (2014-10-01)

===== LDOCE by Dahe shubao tushu gufen youxiangongsi =====
- 5th edition: Includes 230,000 entries, 65,000 collocations, 18,000-word synonyms and antonyms, 3000 common oral and written words. New thesaurus, grammar, collocation sections. DVD supports Microsoft Windows 2000(SP4) to Windows 10, includes contents from LDOCE and Longman Concise Chinese-English Dictionary, English pronunciations, bookmarks and notes. Online contents (available for four years after activation) includes online vocabulary and grammatical resources (including short video, interactive exercises and examinations), Longman Communication 9000.
  - Traditional Chinese version (Longman Dictionary of Contemporary English (English-Chinese) 5th Edition/朗文當代高級英漢雙解辭典第五版)
    - Hardcover bi-colour edition with four years online service (with English LDOCE 6th edition)+DVD (ISBN 978-916001562-8)
      - 1st? impression (2017-01-12)

===== LDOCE by XCome Technology Ltd. =====
- 4th edition
  - Android version (Longman Dictionary): Based on Longman Dictionary of Contemporary English (English-Chinese) (4th edition).
    - 1.5.8 (Android 2.3.3, 2017-06-15)
  - iOS version (朗文当代高级词典(英英/英汉 双解), 朗文當代高級辭典(英英/英漢 雙解)
    - 1.0 (2015-12-21)
    - 1.1 (2016-01-20)
    - 1.2 (2017-07-05)
    - 1.3 (iOS 8.0, 2017-07-20)

==== Multilingual dictionaries ====
===== LDOCE by English Channel, Inc. =====
- 5th edition: Free version includes Full-text Search activation. Pay features includes LDOCE 5th edition, examples sounds, Longman Activator Thesaurus (each sold separately).
  - iOS version (Longman Dictionary of Contemporary English/朗文當代高級詞典)
    - 6.8 (2016-04-08)
    - 6.9 (2016-09-08)
    - 7.0 (2017-03-04)
    - 7.1 (2017-03-14)
    - 7.1.1 (2017-03-27)
    - 7.1.2 (2017-04-17)
    - 7.2 (2017-05-05)
    - 8.1 (2017-11-17): iPhone X support.
    - 8.3 (2017-12-12)
    - 8.3.1 (2017-12-16)
    - 8.3.2 (2017-12-22)
    - 8.4 (2018-01-18)
    - 8.4.1 (2018-02-16)
    - 8.4.2 (2018-10-10): iOS 12 support.
    - 8.5 (2018-11-26)
    - 9.0 (2019-03-08)
    - 9.1 (2020-02-02): iOS 13 support.
    - 9.1.1 (2020-02-13)
    - 9.2 (2020-02-24)
    - 9.3 (2020-02-26)
    - 9.4 (2020-03-21): Adds Activator purchase option.
    - 9.5 (2020-03-29)
    - 9.5.1 (2020-05-01)
    - 9.6 (2020-08-06)
    - 9.7 (2020-08-19, iOS 8.0, 33 languages (traditional/simplified Chinese, Danish, Russian, Catalan, Hungarian, North Indic, Indonesian, Turkish, Tagalog, Hebrew, Kurdish, German, Irish, Slovenian, Japanese, French, Bosnian, Persian, Polish, Thai, Swedish, Lithuranian, Italian, Finnish, English, Dutch, Portuguese, Spanish, Vietnamese, Arabic, Korean, Malay)):

=== Longman Collocations Dictionary and Thesaurus ===
==== English dictionaries ====
- 1st edition: Includes 75,000 collocations, 80,000 examples, 7,000 synonyms and antonyms, academic words list, academic collocations list (2,500 most frequent collocations based on analysis of the Pearson International Corpus of Academic English). 1-year subscription includes additional collocations and synonyms, interactive exercises.
  - Cased edition+12 months online subscription (ISBN 978-1-4082-5225-3)
  - Peason Education Limited paperback bi-colour edition+12 months online subscription (ISBN 1-4082-5226-0/ISBN 978-1-4082-5226-0)
  - Peason Education Limited paperback bi-colour edition+12 months online subscription (ISBN 1-4082-5226-0/ISBN 978-1-4082-5226-0)
    - 1st? impression (2013-?-?)
  - Allyn & Bacon paperback bi-colour edition+12 months online subscription (ISBN 1-4082-5226-0/ISBN 978-1-4082-5226-0)
    - 1st? impression (2015-07-05)
