= Merriam-Webster's Advanced Learner's English Dictionary =

Dictionary published by Merriam-Webster

- Genre: Dictionary
- Publication date: 2008
- ISBN: 9780877795513

The Merriam-Webster's Advanced Learner's English Dictionary (ISBN 978-0-87779-550-6) is an advanced learner's dictionary published in 2008. It focuses on American English for people learning English as a second language.

It is distinctive in that it shows inflections for all word types, whether regular or irregular. For example, the regular plural -s for count nouns, three verb forms (third person singular, past tense, and gerund) and comparative and superlative forms for adjectives. Homographs for verbs and nouns are also given separate entries.
