= Advanced learner's dictionary =

Type of monolingual learner's dictionary

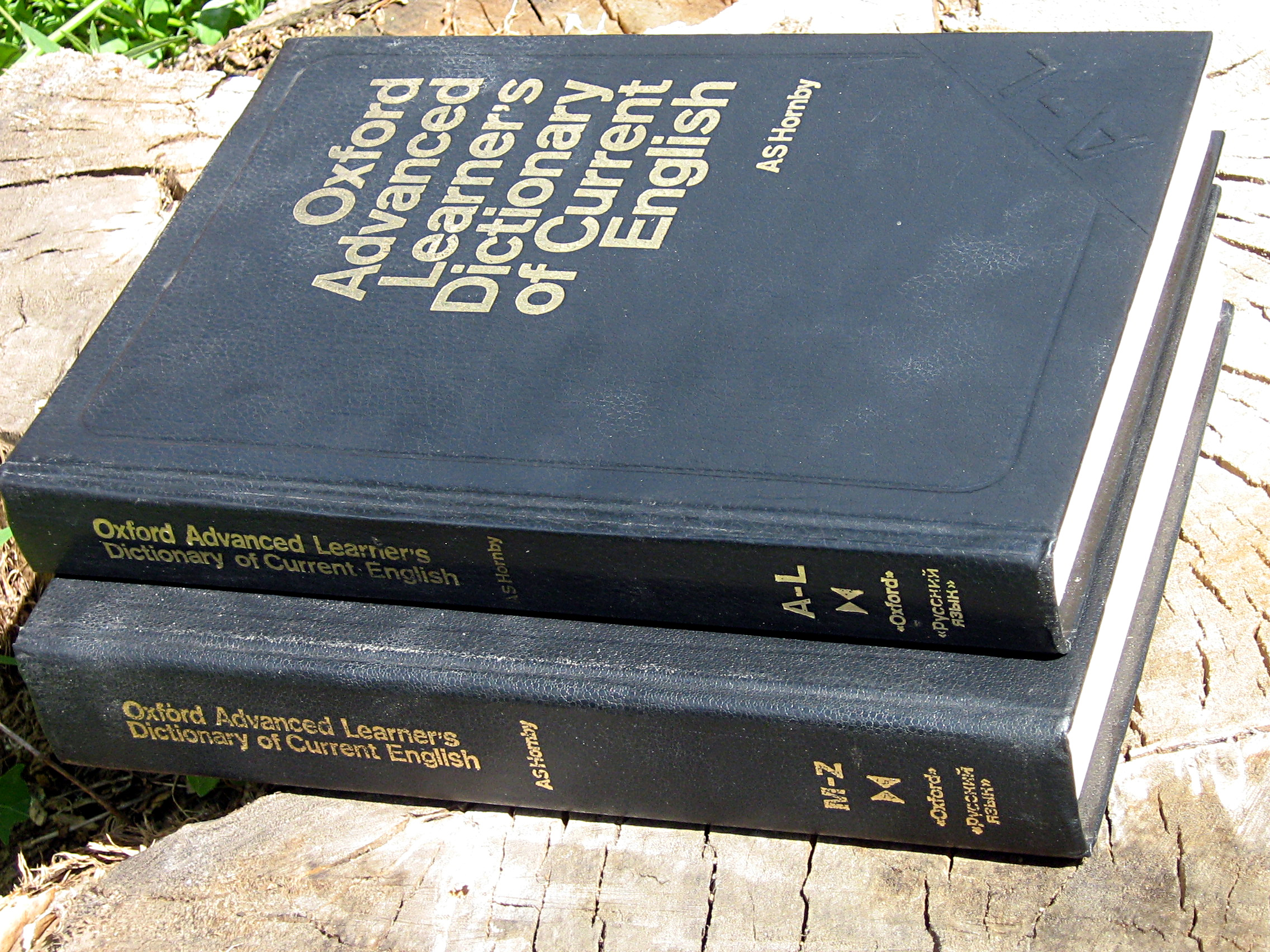
The Oxford Advanced Learner's Dictionary of Current English. Special edition in two volumes (USSR, 1982).

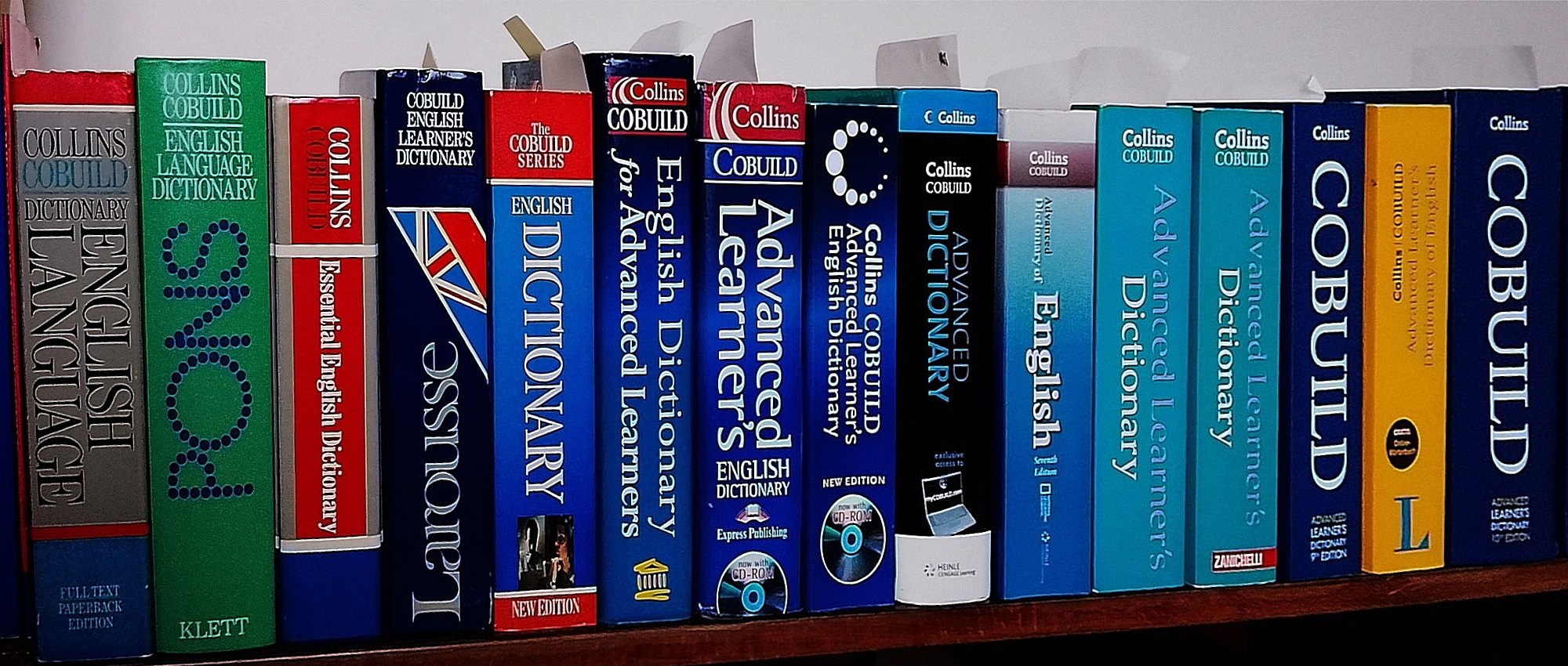
Some Collins COBUILD learners' dictionaries published between 1987 and 2023

The advanced learner's dictionary is the most common type of monolingual learner's dictionary, that is, a dictionary written in one language only, for someone who is learning a foreign language. It differs from a bilingual or translation dictionary, a standard dictionary written for native speakers, or a children's dictionary. Its definitions are usually built on a restricted defining vocabulary. "Advanced" usually refers learners with a proficiency level of B2 or above according to the Common European Framework. Basic learner's dictionaries also exist.

Although these advanced dictionaries have been produced for learners of several languages (including Chinese, Dutch, German, and Spanish), the majority are written for learners of English.

== Printed ==
The best-known advanced learner's dictionaries are:

- Oxford Advanced Learner's Dictionary, first published in 1948
- Longman Dictionary of Contemporary English, first published in 1978
- Collins COBUILD Advanced Learner's Dictionary, first published in 1987
- Cambridge Advanced Learner's Dictionary, first published in 1995 as the Cambridge International Dictionary of English
- Macmillan English Dictionary for Advanced Learners, first published in 2002
- Merriam-Webster's Advanced Learner's English Dictionary, first published in 2008

The Macmillan dictionary is no longer being maintained: it went online-only in the 2010s and shut down entirely in 2023. So there are four popular learner's dictionaries for British English that are still active, while Merriam-Webster's aims for American English in particular.

== See also ==
- Comparison of English dictionaries
