= Word family =

Base form of a word plus its inflected forms and derived forms made from affixes

A word family is the base form of a word plus its inflected forms and derived forms made with suffixes and prefixes plus its cognates, i.e. all words that have a common etymological origin, some of which native speakers do not recognize as being related (e.g. "wrought (iron)" and "work(ed)"). In the English language, inflectional affixes include third person -s, verbal -ed and -ing, plural -s, possessive -s, comparative -er and superlative -est. Derivational affixes include -able, -er, -ish, -less, -ly, -ness, -th, -y, non-, un-, -al, -ation, -ess, -ful, -ism, -ist, -ity, -ize/-ise, -ment, in-. The idea is that a base word and its inflected forms support the same core meaning, and can be considered learned words if a learner knows both the base word and the affix. Bauer and Nation proposed seven levels of affixes based on their frequency in English. It has been shown that word families can assist with deriving related words via affixes, along with decreasing the time needed to derive and recognize such words.

== Effects on learning ==
There are several studies that suggest that knowledge of root words and their derivatives can assist with learning or even deducing the meaning of other members of a word family. A study from Carlisle and Katz (2006) comparing separate English word families varying in size, frequency, and affirmation and negation suggests that “accuracy of reading derived words by 4th and 6th graders is related to measures of familiarity, ... base word frequencies, family size, average family frequency, and word length”. It was found that families that were either larger or more frequent (i.e. word families that had more words or were more common) were more quickly read. Nagy et al. (1989) found that morphologically related families had an increase of reaction time of up to 7 ms compared to those without a morphological relation. Nagy et al. (1993) summarizes how knowledge of the meanings of common English suffixes underwent significant development between fourth grade and high school.

=== Studies on non-native speakers ===
There have also been studies on non-native English speakers and learners on their knowledge and understanding of word families. A study of nonnative-English-speaking college students showed that non-native English speakers knew at least some of the four word forms studied (nouns, verbs, adjectives, and adverbs). Out of these four, word families derived from nouns and verbs were found to be the most well-known. Results showed that in regards to these word forms, ESL students knew the least, MA-ELT (English Language Teaching) students knew more, and native speakers knew the most. In addition, a study of Japanese students learning English showed poor knowledge of the affixes studied, showing a division between their knowledge of a word's meaning and a derivative form of a separate word (e.g. stimulate versus similar, disclose and far). To conclude their study, Schmitt and Zimmerman have provided the following for those teaching word families as a guideline:

- Introduce derivatives along with their roots.
- Teach more affixes.
- Emphasize adverbs, adjectives, and their derivatives.
- Suggest reading that includes these word families.

== See also ==
- Headword (lemma)
- Lexeme
