= Michael Philip West =

English language teacher and researcher (1888–1973)

Michael Philip West (1888–1973) was an English language teacher and researcher who worked extensively in India in the mid 1900s. He produced the reading scheme "The New Method Readers" (Longmans, Green and Co) and A General Service List of English Words (Longman, Harlow, Essex, 1953).
