= Vernacular =

Common speech variety of a specific population

Vernacular is the ordinary, informal, spoken form of a language or dialect. The term particularly carries the perception of a language variety with lower social status or less prestige than standard language, which is more codified, institutionally promoted, literary, or formal. More narrowly, any particular variety of a language that does not hold a widespread high-status perception, and sometimes even carries social stigma, is also called a vernacular, vernacular dialect, nonstandard dialect, etc. and is typically its speakers' native variety. Regardless of any such stigma, all nonstandard dialects are full-fledged varieties of language with their own consistent grammatical structure, sound system, body of vocabulary, etc. Less commonly, vernacular can also refer to written language that intentionally reflects or imitates the aforementioned form of spoken language.

== Overview ==
Like any native language variety, a vernacular has an internally coherent system of grammar. It may be associated with a particular set of vocabulary, and spoken using a variety of accents, styles, and registers. As American linguist John McWhorter describes about a number of dialects spoken in the American South in earlier U.S. history, including older African-American Vernacular English, "the often nonstandard speech of Southern white planters, nonstandard British dialects of indentured servants, and West Indian patois, [...] were nonstandard but not substandard." In other words, the adjective "nonstandard" should not be taken to mean that these various dialects were intrinsically incorrect, less logical, or otherwise inferior, only that they were not the socially perceived norm or mainstream considered prestigious or appropriate for public speech; however, nonstandard dialects are indeed often stigmatized as such, due to socially-induced post-hoc rationalization. Again, however, linguistics regards all varieties of a language as coherent, complex, and complete systems—even nonstandard varieties.

A dialect or language variety that is a vernacular may not have historically benefited from the institutional support or sanction that a standard dialect has. According to another definition, a vernacular is a language that has not developed a standard variety, undergone codification, or established a literary tradition.

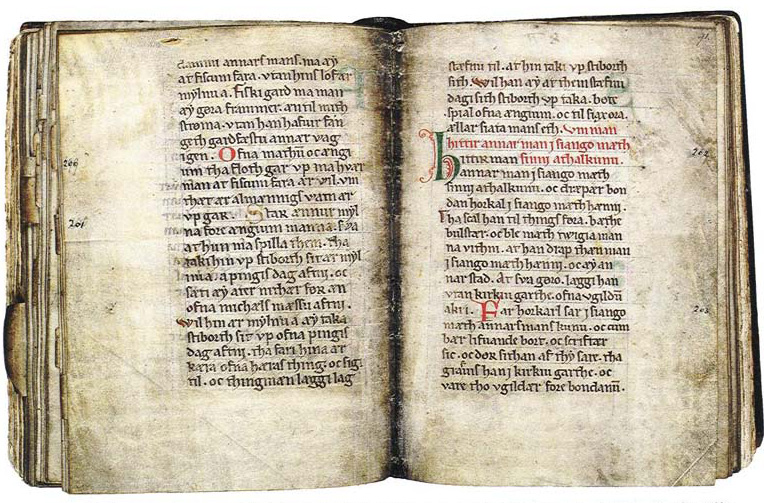
The oldest known vernacular manuscript in Scanian (Danish, c. 1250). It deals with Scanian and Scanian Ecclesiastical Law.

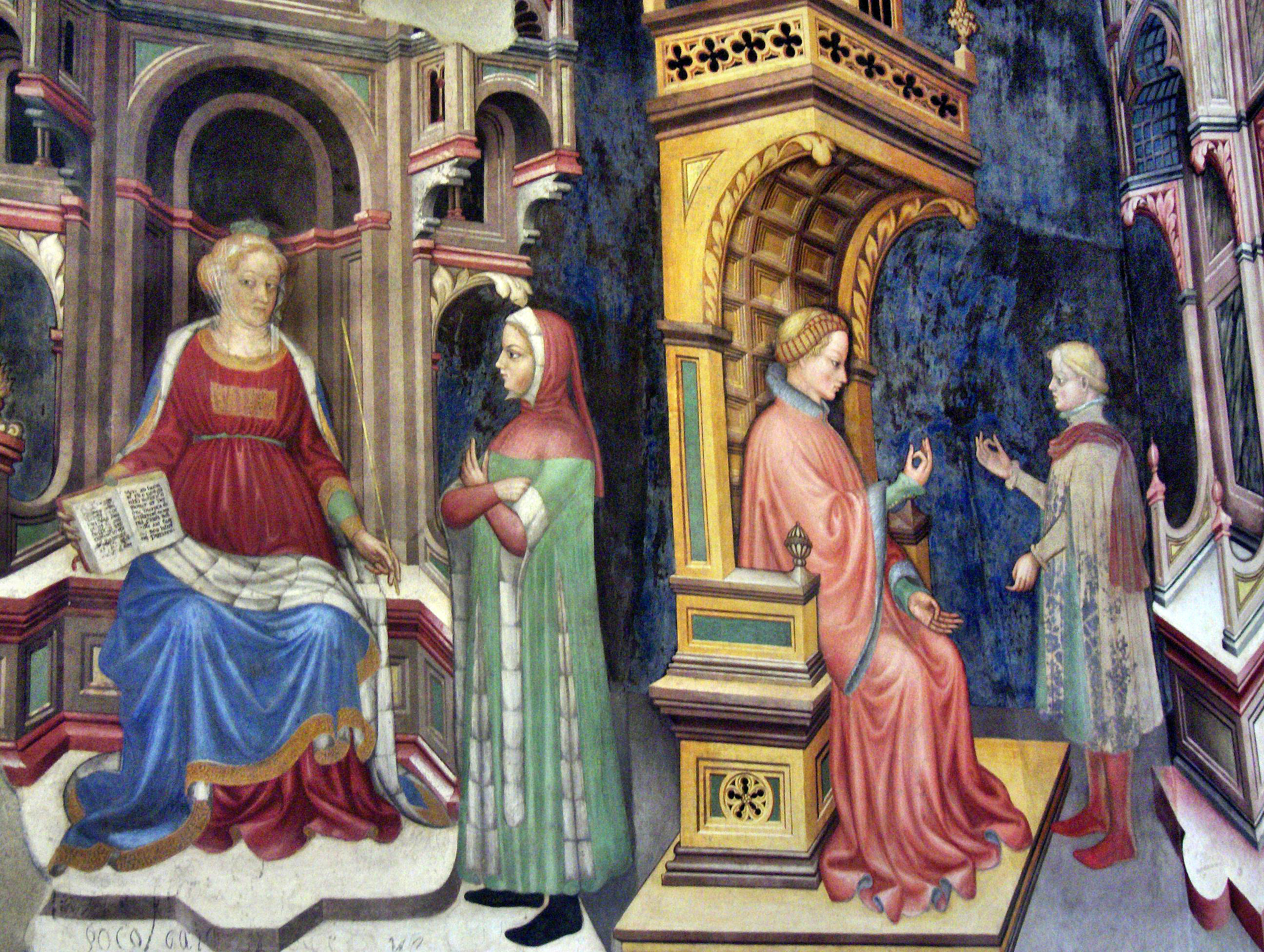
An allegory of rhetoric and arithmetic, Trinci Palace, Foligno, Italy, by Gentile da Fabriano, who lived in the era of Italian language standardization

Vernacular may vary from overtly prestigious speech varieties in different ways, in that the vernacular can be a distinct stylistic register, a regional dialect, a sociolect, or an independent language. Vernacular is a term for a type of speech variety, generally used to refer to a local language or dialect, as distinct from what is seen as a standard language. The vernacular is contrasted with higher-prestige forms of language, such as national, literary, liturgical or scientific idiom, or a lingua franca, used to facilitate communication across a large area. However, vernaculars usually carry covert prestige among their native speakers, in showcasing group identity or sub-culture affiliation.

As a border case, a nonstandard dialect may even have its own written form, though it could then be assumed that the orthography is unstable, inconsistent, or unsanctioned by powerful institutions, like that of government or education. The most salient instance of nonstandard dialects in writing would likely be nonstandard phonemic spelling of reported speech in literature or poetry (e.g., the publications of Jamaican poet Linton Kwesi Johnson) where it is sometimes described as eye dialect.

Nonstandard dialects have been used in classic literature throughout history. One famous example of this is Mark Twain's The Adventures of Huckleberry Finn. This classic piece of literature, commonly taught in schools in the U.S., includes dialogue from various characters in their own native vernaculars (including representations of Older Southern American English and African-American English), which are not written in standard English.

In the case of the English language, while it has become common to assume that nonstandard varieties should not be taught, there has been evidence to prove that teaching nonstandard dialects in the classroom can encourage some children to learn English.

== Etymology ==
The first known usage of the word "vernacular" in English is not recent. In 1688, James Howell wrote:

Concerning Italy, doubtless there were divers before the Latin did spread all over that Country; the Calabrian, and Apulian spoke Greek, whereof some Relics are to be found to this day; but it was an adventitious, no Mother-Language to them: 'tis confess'd that Latium it self, and all the Territories about Rome, had the Latin for its maternal and common first vernacular Tongue; but Tuscany and Liguria had others quite discrepant, viz. the Hetruscane and Mesapian, whereof though there be some Records yet extant; yet there are none alive that can understand them: The Oscan, the Sabin and Tusculan, are thought to be but Dialects to these.

Here, vernacular, mother language and dialect are in use in a modern sense. According to Merriam-Webster, "vernacular" was brought into the English language as early as 1601 from the Latin vernaculus ("native") which had been in figurative use in Classical Latin as "national" and "domestic", having originally been derived from verna, a slave born in the house rather than abroad. The figurative meaning was broadened from the diminutive extended words vernaculus, vernacula. Varro, the classical Latin grammarian, used the term vocabula vernacula, "termes de la langue nationale" or "vocabulary of the national language" as opposed to foreign words.

== Concepts of the vernacular ==
=== General linguistics ===
==== In contrast with lingua franca ====
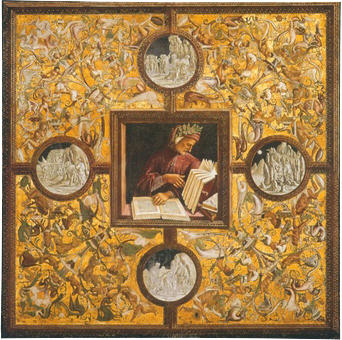
Allegory of Dante Alighieri, champion of the use of vernacular Italian for literature rather than the lingua franca, Latin. Fresco by Luca Signorelli in the cappella di San Brizio dome, Orvieto

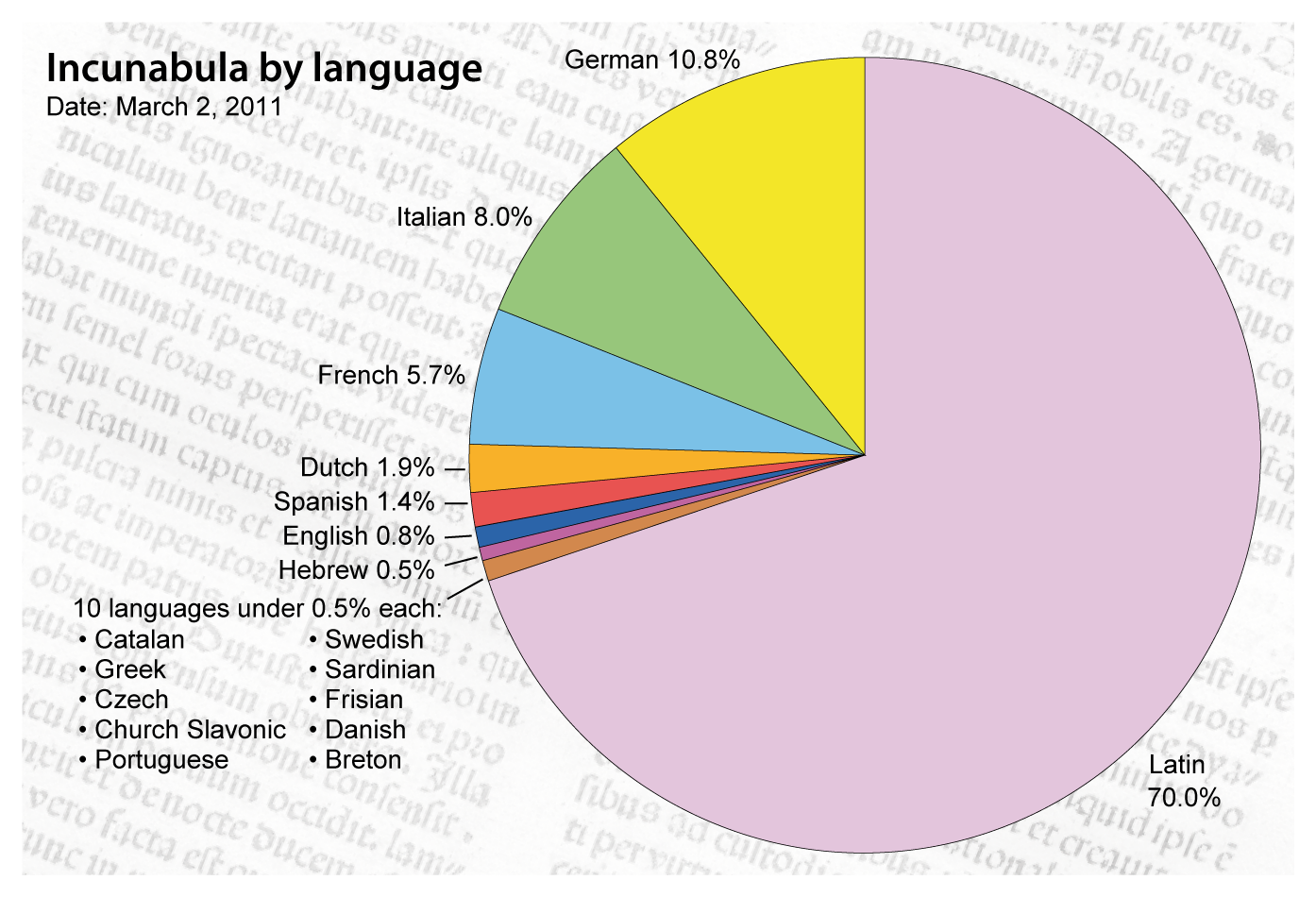
Ratio of books printed in Europe in the vernacular languages to those in Latin in the 15th century

In general linguistics, a vernacular is contrasted with a lingua franca, a third-party language in which persons speaking different vernaculars not understood by each other may communicate. For instance, in Western Europe until the 17th century, most scholarly works had been written in Latin, which was serving as a lingua franca. Works written in Romance languages are said to be in the vernacular. The Divina Commedia, the Cantar de Mio Cid, and The Song of Roland are examples of early vernacular literature in Italian, Spanish, and French, respectively.

In Europe, Latin was used widely instead of vernacular languages in varying forms until c. 1701, in its latter stage as Neo-Latin.

In religion, Protestantism was a driving force in the use of the vernacular in Christian Europe, the Bible having been translated from Latin into vernacular languages with such works as the Bible in Dutch: published in 1526 by Jacob van Liesvelt; Bible in French: published in 1528 by Jacques Lefevre d'Étaples (or Faber Stapulensis); German Luther Bible in 1534 (New Testament 1522); Bible in Spanish: published in Basel in 1569 by Casiodoro de Reina (Biblia del Oso); Bible in Czech: Bible of Kralice, printed between 1579 and 1593; Bible in English: King James Bible, published in 1611; Bible in Slovene, published in 1584 by Jurij Dalmatin. In Catholicism, vernacular bibles were later provided, but Latin was used at Tridentine Mass until the Second Vatican Council of 1965. Certain groups, notably Traditionalist Catholics, continue to practice Latin Mass. In Eastern Orthodox Church, four Gospels translated to vernacular Ukrainian language in 1561 are known as Peresopnytsia Gospel.

In India, the 12th century Bhakti movement led to the translation of Sanskrit texts to the vernacular.

In science, an early user of the vernacular was Galileo, writing in Italian c. 1600, though some of his works remained in Latin. A later example is Isaac Newton, whose 1687 Principia was in Latin, but whose 1704 Opticks was in English. Latin continues to be used in certain fields of science, notably binomial nomenclature in biology, while other fields such as mathematics use vernacular; see scientific nomenclature for details.

In diplomacy, French displaced Latin in Europe in the 1710s, due to the military power of Louis XIV of France.

Certain languages have both a classical form and various vernacular forms, with two widely used examples being Arabic and Chinese: see Varieties of Arabic and Chinese language. In the 1920s, due to the May Fourth Movement, Classical Chinese was replaced by written vernacular Chinese.

==== As a low variant in diglossia ====
The vernacular is also often contrasted with a liturgical language, a specialized use of a former lingua franca. For example, until the 1960s, the Roman Rite of the Catholic Church was generally celebrated in Latin rather than in vernaculars. The Eastern Orthodox Churches use their archaic language forms for their liturgies like Koine Greek for the Greek Orthodox Church and Church Slavonic for the Slavic Churches. The Coptic Church still holds liturgies in Coptic, not Arabic. The Ethiopian Orthodox Church holds liturgies in Ge'ez, but parts of the Mass are read in Amharic.

Similarly, in Hindu culture, traditionally religious or scholarly works were written in Sanskrit (long after its use as a spoken language) or in Tamil in Tamil country. Sanskrit was a lingua franca among the non-Indo-European languages of the Indian subcontinent and became more of one as the spoken languages, or prakrits, began to diverge from it in different regions. With the rise of the bhakti movement from the 12th century onwards, religious works were created in other languages: Hindi, Kannada, Telugu and many others. For example, the Ramayana, one of Hinduism's sacred epics in Sanskrit, had vernacular versions such as Ranganadha Ramayanam composed in Telugu by Gona Buddha Reddy in the 15th century; and Ramacharitamanasa, a Awadhi version of the Ramayana by the 16th-century poet Tulsidas.

These circumstances are a contrast between a vernacular and language variant used by the same speakers. According to one school of linguistic thought, all such variants are examples of a linguistic phenomenon termed diglossia ("split tongue", on the model of the genetic anomaly). In it, the language is bifurcated: the speaker learns two forms of the language and ordinarily uses one but under special circumstances uses the other. The one most frequently used is the low (L) variant, equivalent to the vernacular, while the special variant is the high (H). The concept was introduced to linguistics by Charles A. Ferguson (1959), but Ferguson explicitly excluded variants as divergent as dialects or different languages or as similar as styles or registers. It must not be a conversational form; Ferguson had in mind a literary language. For example, a lecture is delivered in a different variety than ordinary conversation. Ferguson's own example was classical and spoken Arabic, but the analogy between Vulgar Latin and Classical Latin is of the same type. Excluding the upper-class and lower-class register aspects of the two variants, Classical Latin was a literary language; the people spoke Vulgar Latin as a vernacular.

Joshua Fishman redefined the concept in 1964 to include everything Ferguson had excluded. Fishman allowed both different languages and dialects and also different styles and registers as the H variants. The essential contrast between them was that they be "functionally differentiated"; that is, H must be used for special purposes, such as a liturgical or sacred language. Fasold expanded the concept still further by proposing that multiple H exist in society from which the users can select for various purposes. The definition of an H is intermediate between Ferguson's and Fishman's. Realizing the inappropriateness of the term diglossia (only two) to his concept, he proposes the term broad diglossia.

=== Sociolinguistics ===
Within sociolinguistics, the term "vernacular" has been applied to several concepts. Context, therefore, is crucial to determining its intended sense.

==== As an informal register ====
In variation theory, pioneered by William Labov, language is a large set of styles or registers from which the speaker selects according to the social setting of the moment. The vernacular is "the least self-conscious style of people in a relaxed conversation", or "the most basic style"; that is, casual varieties used spontaneously rather than self-consciously, informal talk used in intimate situations. In other contexts the speaker does conscious work to select the appropriate variations. The one they can use without this effort is the first form of speech acquired.

==== As a non-standard dialect ====
In another theory, the vernacular language is opposed to the standard language. The non-standard varieties thus defined are dialects, which are to be identified as complexes of factors: "social class, region, ethnicity, situation, and so forth". Both the standard and non-standard languages have dialects, but in contrast to the standard language, the non-standard language has "socially disfavored" structures. The standard language is primarily written (in traditional print media), whereas the non-standard language is spoken. An example of a vernacular dialect is African American Vernacular English.

==== As an idealisation ====
A vernacular is not a real language but is "an abstract set of norms".

== First vernacular grammars ==
Vernaculars acquired the status of official languages through metalinguistic publications. Between 1437 and 1586, the first reference grammars of Italian, Spanish, French, Dutch, German and English were written, though not always immediately published. It is to be understood that the first precursors of those languages preceded their standardization by up to several hundred years.

=== Dutch ===
In the 16th century, the "rederijkerskamers" (learned, literary societies founded throughout Flanders and Holland from the 1420s onward) attempted to impose a Latin structure on Dutch, on the presumption that Latin grammar had a "universal character". However, in 1559, John III van de Werve, Lord of Hovorst published his grammar Den schat der Duytsscher Talen in Dutch; Dirck Volckertszoon Coornhert (Eenen nieuwen ABC of Materi-boeck) followed five years after, in 1564. The Latinizing tendency changed course, with a joint publication, in 1584 by De Eglantier and the rhetoric society of Amsterdam; this was to be the first comprehensive Dutch grammar, Twe-spraack vande Nederduitsche letterkunst/ ófte Vant spellen ende eyghenscap des Nederduitschen taals. Hendrick Laurenszoon Spieghel was a major contributor, with others contributing as well.

=== English ===
Modern English is considered to have begun at a conventional date of about 1550, most notably at the end of the Great Vowel Shift. It was created by the infusion of Old French into Old English, after the Norman Conquest of 1066 AD, and of Latin at the instigation of the clerical administration. While present-day English speakers may be able to read Middle English authors (such as Geoffrey Chaucer), Old English is much more difficult.

Middle English is known for its alternative spellings and pronunciations. The British Isles, although geographically limited, have always supported populations of widely-varied dialects, as well as a few different languages; some examples of languages and regional accents (and/or dialects) within Great Britain include Scotland (Scottish Gaelic and Broad (Lowland) Scots), Northumbria, Yorkshire, Wales (Welsh), the Isle of Man (Manx), Devon, and Cornwall (Cornish).

Being the language of a maritime power, English was (of necessity) formed from elements of many different languages. Standardisation has been an ongoing issue. Even in the age of modern communications and mass media, according to one study, "… although the Received Pronunciation of Standard English has been heard constantly on radio and then television for over 60 years, only 3 to 5% of the population of Britain actually speaks RP … new brands of English have been springing up even in recent times ...." What the vernacular would be in this case is a moot point: "… the standardisation of English has been in progress for many centuries."

Modern English came into being as the standard Middle English (i.e., as the preferred dialect of the monarch, court and administration). That dialect was of the East Midland, which had spread to London, where the king resided and from which he ruled. It contained Danish forms not often used in the north or south, as the Danes had settled heavily in the midlands. Chaucer wrote in an early East Midland style; John Wycliffe translated the New Testament into it, and William Caxton, the first English printer, wrote in it. Caxton is considered the first modern English author. The first printed book in England was Chaucer's Canterbury Tales, published by Caxton in 1476.

The first English grammars were written in Latin, with some in French, after a general plea for mother-tongue education in England: The first part of the elementary, published in 1582, by Richard Mulcaster. In 1586, William Bullokar wrote the first English grammar to be written in English, the Pamphlet for Grammar. This was followed by Bref Grammar, in that same year. Previously he had written the Booke at Large for the Amendment of Orthography for English Speech (1580), but his orthography was not generally accepted and was soon supplanted, thus his grammar shared a similar fate. Other grammars in English followed rapidly; Paul Greaves' Grammatica Anglicana (1594), Alexander Hume's Orthographie and Congruitie of the Britain Tongue (1617), and many others. Over the succeeding decades, many literary figures turned a hand to grammar in English; Alexander Gill, Ben Jonson, Joshua Poole, John Wallis, Jeremiah Wharton, James Howell, Thomas Lye, Christopher Cooper, William Lily, John Colet and more, all leading to the massive dictionary of Samuel Johnson.

=== French ===
French (as Old French) emerged as a Gallo-Romance language from Colloquial Latin during late antiquity. The written language is known from at least as early as the 9th century. That language contained many forms still identifiable as Latin. Interest in standardizing French began in the 16th century. Because of the Norman conquest of England and the Anglo-Norman domains in both northwestern France and Britain, English scholars retained an interest in the fate of French as well as of English. Some of the numerous 16th-century surviving grammars are:

- John Palsgrave, L'esclarcissement de la langue francoyse (1530; in English).
- Louis Meigret, Tretté de la grammaire françoeze (1550).
- Robert Stephanus: Traicté de la grammaire françoise (1557).

=== German ===
The development of a standard German was impeded by political disunity and strong local traditions until the invention of printing made possible a "High German-based book language". This literary language was not identical to any specific variety of German. The first grammar evolved from pedagogical works that also tried to create a uniform standard from the many regional dialects for various reasons. Religious leaders wished to create a sacred language for Protestantism that would be parallel to the use of Latin for the Roman Catholic Church. Various administrations wished to create a civil service, or chancery, language that would be useful in more than one locality. And finally, nationalists wished to counter the spread of the French national language into German-speaking territories assisted by the efforts of the French Academy.

With so many linguists moving in the same direction, a standard German (hochdeutsche Schriftsprache) did evolve without the assistance of a language academy. Its precise origin, the major constituents of its features, remains uncertainly known and debatable. Latin prevailed as a lingua franca until the 17th century, when grammarians began to debate the creation of an ideal language. Before 1550 as a conventional date, "supraregional compromises" were used in printed works, such as the one published by Valentin Ickelsamer (Ein Teutsche Grammatica) 1534. Books published in one of these artificial variants began to increase in frequency, replacing the Latin then in use. After 1550 the supraregional ideal broadened to a universal intent to create a national language from Early New High German by deliberately ignoring regional forms of speech, which practice was considered to be a form of purification parallel to the ideal of purifying religion in Protestantism.

In 1617, the Fruitbearing Society, a language club, was formed in Weimar in imitation of the Accademia della Crusca in Italy. It was one of many such clubs; however, none became a national academy. In 1618–1619 Johannes Kromayer wrote the first all-German grammar. In 1641 Justin Georg Schottel in teutsche Sprachkunst presented the standard language as an artificial one. By the time of his work of 1663, ausführliche Arbeit von der teutschen Haubt-Sprache, the standard language was well established.

=== Irish ===
Auraicept na n-Éces is a grammar of the Irish language which is thought to date back as far as the 7th century: the earliest surviving manuscripts are 12th-century.

=== Italian ===
Italian appears before standardization as the lingua Italica of Isidore and the lingua vulgaris of subsequent medieval writers. Documents of mixed Latin and vernacular are known from the 12th century, which appears to be the start of writing in the volgare precursor of Italian.

The first known grammar of a Romance language was a book written in manuscript form by Leon Battista Alberti between 1437 and 1441 and entitled Grammatica della lingua toscana, "Grammar of the Tuscan Language". In it Alberti sought to demonstrate that the vernacular – here Tuscan, the basis of modern Italian – was every bit as structured as Latin. He did so by mapping vernacular structures onto Latin.

The book was never printed until 1908. It was not generally known, but it was known, as an inventory of the library of Lorenzo de'Medici lists it under the title Regule lingue florentine ("Rules of the Florentine language"). The only known manuscript copy, however, is included in the codex, Reginense Latino 1370, located at Rome in the Vatican Library. It is therefore called the Grammatichetta vaticana.

More influential perhaps were the 1516 Regole grammaticali della volgar lingua of Giovanni Francesco Fortunio and the 1525 Prose della vulgar lingua of Pietro Bembo. In those works the authors strove to establish a dialect that would qualify for becoming the Italian national language.

=== Occitan ===
The first grammar in a vernacular language in western Europe was published in Toulouse in 1327. Known as the Leys d'amor and written by Guilhèm Molinièr, an advocate of Toulouse, it was published in order to codify the use of the Occitan language in poetry competitions organized by the company of the Gai Saber in both grammar and rhetorical ways.

=== Spanish ===
Chronologically, Spanish (more accurately, lengua castellana) has a development similar to that of Italian. There was some vocabulary in Isidore of Seville, with traces afterward, writing from about the 12th century; standardisation began in the 15th century, concurrent with the rise of Castile as an international power. The first Spanish grammar by Antonio de Nebrija (Tratado de gramática sobre la lengua Castellana, 1492) was divided into parts for native and nonnative speakers, pursuing a different purpose in each. Books 1–4 describe the Spanish language grammatically, in order to facilitate the study of Latin for its Spanish-speaking readers. Book 5 contains a phonetical and morphological overview of Spanish for nonnative speakers.

=== Welsh ===
The Grammar Books of the Master-poets (Welsh: Gramadegau'r Penceirddiaid) are considered to have been composed in the early fourteenth century, and are present in manuscripts from soon after. These tractates draw on the traditions of the Latin grammars of Donatus and Priscianus and also on the teaching of the professional Welsh poets. The tradition of grammars of the Welsh Language developed from these through the Middle Ages and to the Renaissance.

== First vernacular dictionaries ==
A dictionary is to be distinguished from a glossary. Although numerous glossaries publishing vernacular words had long been in existence, such as the Etymologiae of Isidore of Seville, which listed many Spanish words, the first vernacular dictionaries emerged together with vernacular grammars.

=== Dutch ===
Glossaries in Dutch began about 1470 AD leading eventually to two Dutch dictionaries:

- Christophe Plantin: Thesaurus Theutonicae Linguae, 1573
- Cornelis Kiliaan: Dictionarium Teutonico-Latinum, 1574 (becoming Etymologicum with the 1599 3rd edition)

Shortly after (1579) the Southern Netherlands came under the dominion of Spain, then of Austria (1713) and of France (1794). The Congress of Vienna created the United Kingdom of the Netherlands in 1815 from which southern Netherlands (being Catholic) seceded in 1830 to form the Kingdom of Belgium, which was confirmed in 1839 by the Treaty of London. As a result of this political instability no standard Dutch was defined (even though much in demand and recommended as an ideal) until after World War II. Currently the Dutch Language Union, an international treaty organization founded in 1980, supports a standard Dutch in the Netherlands, while Afrikaans is regulated by Die Taalkommissie founded in 1909.

=== English ===
Standard English remains a quasi-fictional ideal, despite the numerous private organizations publishing prescriptive rules for it. No language academy was ever established or espoused by any government past or present in the English-speaking world. In practice the British monarchy and its administrations established an ideal of what good English should be considered to be, and this in turn was based on the teachings of the major universities, such as Cambridge University and Oxford University, which relied on the scholars whom they hired. There is a general but far from uniform consensus among the leading scholars about what should or should not be said in standard English; but for every rule, examples from famous English writers can be found that break it. Uniformity of spoken English never existed and does not exist now, but usages do exist, which must be learnt by the speakers, and do not conform to prescriptive rules.

Usages have been documented not by prescriptive grammars, which on the whole are less comprehensible to the general public, but by comprehensive dictionaries, often termed unabridged, which attempt to list all usages of words and the phrases in which they occur as well as the date of first use and the etymology where possible. These typically require many volumes, and yet not more so than the unabridged dictionaries of many languages.

Bilingual dictionaries and glossaries precede modern English and were in use in the earliest written English. The first monolingual dictionary was Robert Cawdrey's Table Alphabeticall (1604) which was followed by Edward Phillips's A New World of English Words (1658) and Nathaniel Bailey's An Universal Etymological English Dictionary (1721). These dictionaries whetted the interest of the English-speaking public in greater and more prescriptive dictionaries until Samuel Johnson published Plan of a Dictionary of the English Language (1747), which would imitate the dictionary being produced by the French Academy. He had no problem acquiring the funding, but not as a prescriptive dictionary. This was to be a grand comprehensive dictionary of all English words at any period, A Dictionary of the English Language (1755).

By 1858, the need for an update resulted in the first planning for a new comprehensive dictionary to document standard English, a term coined at that time by the planning committee. The dictionary, known as the Oxford English Dictionary, published its first fascicle in 1884. It attracted significant contributions from some singular minds, such as William Chester Minor, a former army surgeon who had become criminally insane and made most of his contributions while incarcerated. Whether the OED is the long-desired standard English Dictionary is debatable, but its authority is taken seriously by the entire English-speaking world. Its staff is currently working on a third edition.

=== French ===
Surviving dictionaries are a century earlier than their grammars. The Académie française founded in 1635 was given the obligation of producing a standard dictionary. Some early dictionaries are:

- Louis Cruse, alias Garbin: Dictionaire latin-françois, 1487
- Robert Estienne, alias Robertus Stephanus: Dictionnaire françois–latin, 1539
- Maurice de la Porte: Epitheta, 1571
- Jean Nicot: Thresor de la langue fracoyse, tant ancienne que moderne, 1606
- Pierre Richelet: Dictionnaire françois contenant les mots et les choses, 1680
- Académie française: Dictionnaire de l'Académie française, 1694 annis.

=== German ===
High German dictionaries began in the 16th century and were at first multi-lingual. They were preceded by glossaries of German words and phrases on various specialized topics. Finally interest in developing a vernacular German grew to the point where Maaler could publish a work called by Jacob Grimm "the first truly German dictionary", Joshua Maaler's Die Teutsche Spraach: Dictionarium Germanico-latinum novum (1561).

It was followed along similar lines by Georg Heinisch: Teütsche Sprache und Weißheit (1616). After numerous dictionaries and glossaries of a less-than-comprehensive nature came a thesaurus that attempted to include all German, Kaspar Stieler's Der Teutschen Sprache Stammbaum und Fortwachs oder Teutschen Sprachschatz (1691), and finally the first codification of written German, Johann Christoph Adelung's Versuch eines vollständigen grammatisch-kritischen Wörterbuches Der Hochdeutschen Mundart (1774–1786). Schiller called Adelung an Orakel and Wieland is said to have nailed a copy to his desk.

=== Italian ===
In the early 15th century a number of glossaries appeared, such as that of Lucillo Minerbi on Boccaccio in 1535, and those of Fabrizio Luna on Ariosto, Petrarca, Boccaccio and Dante in 1536. In the mid-16th the dictionaries began, as listed below. In 1582 the first language academy was formed, called Accademia della Crusca, "bran academy", which sifted language like grain. Once formed, its publications were standard-setting.

Monolingual

- Alberto Accarisio: Vocabolario et grammatica con l'orthographia della lingua volgare, 1543
- Francesco Alunno: Le richezze della lingua volgare, 1543
- Francesco Alunno: La fabbrica del mondo, 1548
- Giacomo Pergamini: Il memoriale della lingua italiana, 1602
- Accademia della Crusca: Vocabolario degli Accademici della Crusca, 1612

Italian / French

- Nathanael Duez : Dittionario italiano e francese/Dictionnaire italien et François, Leiden, 1559–1560
- Gabriel Pannonius: Petit vocabulaire en langue françoise et italienne, Lyon, 1578
- Jean Antoine Fenice : Dictionnaire françois et italien, Paris, 1584

Italian / English

- John Florio: A Worlde of Words, London, 1598
- John Florio: Queen Anna's New World of Words, London, 1611

Italian / Spanish

- Cristóbal de las Casas: Vocabulario de las dos lenguas toscana y castellana, Sevilla, 1570
- Lorenzo Franciosini: Vocabulario italiano e spagnolo/ Vocabulario español e italiano, Roma, 1620.

=== Serbo-Croatian ===
- The first vernacular Serbian dictionary was Srpski rječnik (Serbian dictionary) written by Vuk Karadžić and published in 1818.
- Dictionary of Serbo-Croatian Literary and Vernacular Language was initiated in 1888 by Stojan Novaković, still in the making

=== Spanish ===
The first Spanish dictionaries in the 15th century were Latin-Spanish/Spanish-Latin, followed by monolingual Spanish. In 1713 the Real Academia Española, "Royal Spanish Academy", was founded to set standards. It published an official dictionary, 1726–1739.

- Alonzo de Palencia: El universal vocabulario en latin y romance, 1490
- Antonio de Nebrija: Lexicon latino-hispanicum et hispanico-latinum, 1492
- Sebastián de Covarrubias Orozco: Tesoro de la lengua castellana o española, 1611
- Real Academia Española: Diccionario de la lengua castellana, 1726–1739

== Metaphorical usage ==
The term "vernacular" may also be applied metaphorically to any cultural product of the lower, common orders of society that is relatively uninfluenced by the ideas and ideals of the educated élite. Hence, vernacular has had connotations of a coarseness and crudeness. "Vernacular architecture", for example, is a term applied to buildings designed in any style based on practical considerations and local traditions, in contrast to the "polite architecture" produced by professionally trained architects to nationally or internationally agreed aesthetic standards. The historian Guy Beiner has developed the study of "vernacular historiography" as a more sophisticated conceptualization of folk history.

== See also ==
- Broad and general accents
- Colloquial language
- Dialect
- First language
- Folklore
- Glossary
- Language policy
- Literary language
- National language
- Patois
- Slang
- Sociolect
- Standard language
- African-American Vernacular English, a vernacular of English spoken by African Americans

== Bibliography ==
- Wolfram, Walt; Schilling-Estes, Natalie (1998). American English: dialects and variation. Malden, Mass.: Blackwell.
- McWhorter, John H. (2001). Word on the Street: Debunking the Myth of a "Pure" Standard English. Basic Books.
- Fodde Melis, Luisanna (2002). Race, Ethnicity and Dialects: Language Policy and Ethnic Minorities in the United States. FrancoAngeli. ISBN 9788846439123.
- Mesthrie, Rajend (1994). Standardisation and variation in South African English. pp. 181–201.
- Fasold, Ralph (2006) "The politics of language." In R.W. Fasold and J. Connor-Linton (eds) An Introduction to Language and Linguistics. pp. 383-412. Cambridge: Cambridge University Press.
- Nordquist, R., 2019. What Is Nonstandard English?. [online] ThoughtCo. Available at: https://www.thoughtco.com/what-is-nonstandard-english-1691438 [Accessed 5 May 2022].
