= Early English dictionaries =

Before Samuel Johnson's two-volume A Dictionary of the English Language, published in 1755 and considered the most authoritative and influential work of early English lexicography, there were other early English dictionaries: more than a dozen had been published during the preceding 150 years. This article lists the most significant ones.

== Early dictionaries ==
=== Wordbook by Sir Thomas Elyot (1538) ===
This was a Latin-English dictionary, not a monolingual dictionary, published in 1538 and dedicated to Henry VIII. 1542 saw an enlarged second edition.

=== The Elementarie (1582) ===
Composed by Richard Mulcaster, headmaster of Merchant Taylors' School in London, The Elementarie is now viewed as an important forerunner of the first actual dictionary in English, although it was not an actual dictionary. At a time when English spelling was, in Mulcaster's words, "without any certain direction," The Elementarie listed 8,000 words: some of them common ("burn" and "football," for instance), others more obscure ("carpet knight" and "flinder mouse"). The book was intended as part of an analysis of the education of his time and as an argument for spelling reform, and he also defended the use of the vernacular in official writing instead of using the lingua franca, which was Latin.

Because Mulcaster's focus was on spelling, he left the words in his list undefined. All the same, he clearly recognized the need for a more comprehensive reference work: "It were a thing very praise worthy in my opinion . . . if someone well learned and as laborious a man, would gather all the words which we use in our English tongue . . . out of all professions, as well learned as not, into one dictionary, and besides the right writing, which is incident to the Alphabet, wold open unto us therein, both their natural force, and their proper use."

=== A Table Alphabeticall (1604) ===
Schoolmaster Robert Cawdrey's A table alphabeticall, conteyning and teaching the true writing, and understanding of hard usually English words, borrowed from the Hebrew, Greek, Latine, or French etc with the interpretation thereof by plaine English words, gathered for the benefit & help of ladies, gentlewomen, or any other unskillful persons, whereby they may the more easily and better understand many hard English words, which they shall hear or read in scriptures, sermons, or elsewhere, and also be made able to use the same aptly themselves (1604) is generally regarded as the first genuine dictionary in English. It contained roughly 2,500 words, each matched with a synonym or brief definition. According to the book's title page, A Table Alphabetical was intended for "Ladies, Gentlewomen, or any other unskillful persons" so that "they may the more easily and better understand many hard English words, which they shall hear or read in the Scriptures, Sermons, or elsewhere, and also be made able to use them the same aptly themselves."

The first six entries in Cawdrey's Table show the simplicity and directness of his style:

1. Abandon: cast away, or yeeld up, to leave or forsake.
2. Abash: blush.
3. Abba: father.
4. Abbess, abbatesse: Mistress of a Nunnery, comforters of others.
5. abettors: counselors.
6. aberration: a going a stray, or wandering.

=== Glossographia (1656) ===
Thomas Blount's Glossographia, or, A dictionary interpreting all such hard words, of whatsoever language, now used in our refined English tongue (1656) was the fourth proper English dictionary and far larger than any preceding. It defined approximately 10,000 unusual words and was the first English dictionary to include etymologies (or word histories). One of the more exotic and ultimately enduring words to appear in Blount's dictionary was coffee (then spelled "coffa" or "cauphe"): "a kind of drink among the Turks and Persians, (and of late introduced among us) which is black, thick and bitter, destrained from berries of that nature, and name, thought good and very wholesom."

When published, the Glossographia was the largest dictionary in English.

=== The New World of English Words Or A General Dictionary (1658) ===
Almost twice as large as the Glossographia and containing many common words as well as unusual ones, this dictionary was the work of Edward Phillips, a nephew of the poet John Milton. Phillips shamelessly lifted many of the entries in The New World from Blount's work, and his plagiarism did not pass unnoticed, as in 1673 Blount published A World of Errors Discovered in the ‘New World of Words’. In the following years, Blount and Phillips regularly denounced each other in print, an exercise that helped to maintain the public's interest in both dictionaries.
