= Benjamin Martin (lexicographer) =

English lexicographer

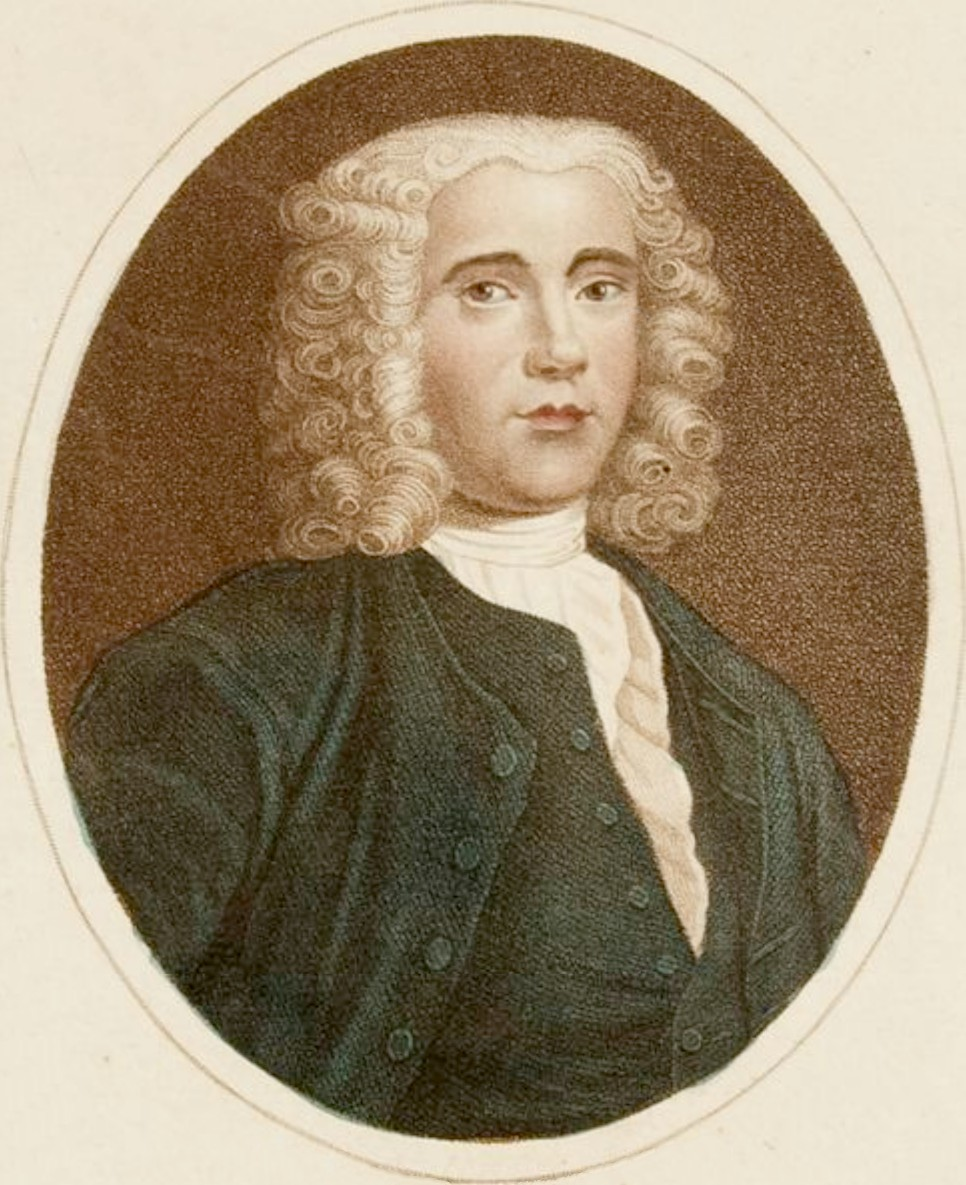
- Born: 1 March 1705 (date of baptism); Worplesdon, Surrey
- Died: 9 February 1782; London
- Occupation: lexicographer

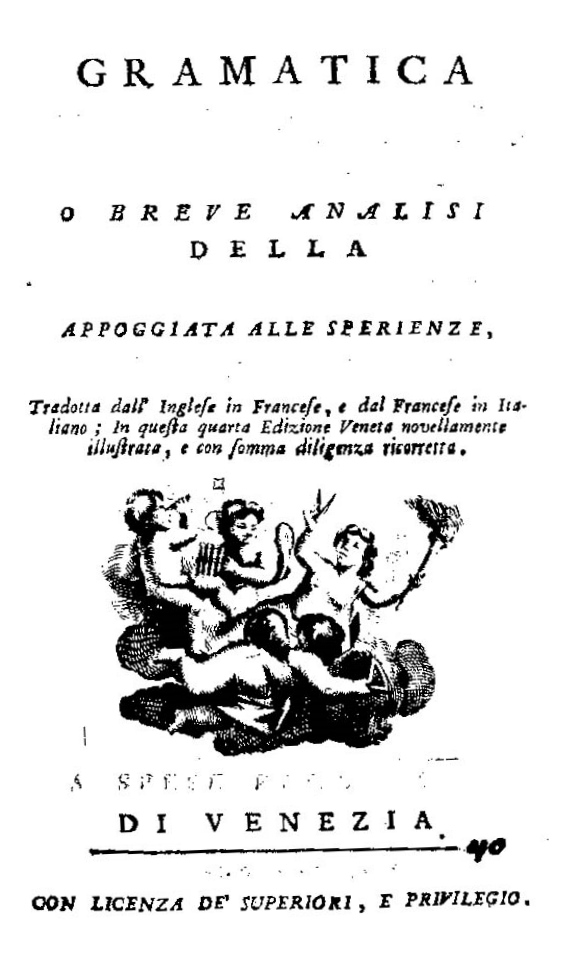
Gramatica delle scienze filosofiche, 1769

Benjamin Martin (baptized 1705; died 1782) was a lexicographer who compiled one of the early English dictionaries, the Lingua Britannica Reformata (1749). He also was a lecturer on science and maker of scientific instruments.

== Life ==
Martin was born in Worplesdon, Surrey and began life as a ploughboy, but graduated to become a teacher. A legacy of £500 enabled him to buy books and instruments, and he became a lecturer and instrument maker. He was an early champion for the Newtonian system. In 1737, he published the Bibliotheca Technologica - a survey of natural philosophy in 25 sub-headings.

In 1740, he moved to Fleet Street, near the Royal Society where his admired Newton would often lecture. He began manufacturing Hadley's quadrant (a predecessor to the sextant) and optical instruments, and also published a book A New and Compendious System of Optics, where he introduced to English the concept of fundamental science (from Neo-Latin scientia fundamentalis). His business prospered, and he also became known as a spectacle maker. He continued to lecture on natural philosophy, and from 1755 to 1764, he also published Martin's Magazine. The periodical, formally known as the General Magazine of Arts and Sciences, set out to provide subscribers with an encyclopedia's worth of knowledge "one Half-sheet upon a Science" at a time. He intended readers eventually to reorganize and rebind the separate parts of individual numbers into one large reference work. He was also the author of The Natural History of England, or, A description of each particular county, in regard to the curious productions of nature and art; 2 vols. London: Printed and sold by W. Owen, Temple-Bar, and by the author, at his house in Fleet-Street, 1759-63.

In 1781, the seventy-seven-year-old Martin went bankrupt; a few years earlier he had handed over his business to several managers who proved inept. He attempted suicide, and while it was not immediately successful, the wound (nature unknown) was grievous enough and he failed to recover, and died on 9 February 1782.

== The Dictionary ==
In 1749, he published the Lingua Britannica Reformata, Or, A New English Dictionary. His dictionary incorporated a largely intact copy of Nathan Bailey's Universal Dictionary of 1721, which Benjamin Martin described as "the best English dictionary hitherto published". Bailey's dictionary in turn had copied heavily from the 1706 Phillips-Kersey English dictionary. A second edition of Martin's dictionary was published in 1754, a year before Samuel Johnson's dictionary.

In compiling his 24,500 word dictionary, he gave up on trying to "fix" the language:

The pretence of fixing a standard to the purity and perfection of any language is utterly vain and impertinent, because no language as depending on arbitrary use and custom, can ever be permanently the same, but will always be in a mutable and fluctuating state; and what is deem’d polite and elegant in one age, may be counted uncouth and barbarous in another.

This dynamic view of language was also adopted by Johnson and has become the accepted view in modern lexicography. His dictionary also pre-saged Johnson in that he laid out a detailed set of objectives (that it should be universal, explain the etymologies, etc.).

While his etymologies are often inconsistent and tended to err in favour of Latin origins, his work was an improvement on earlier dictionaries in that it had a simpler system of spelling and a clearer guide to pronunciation.
