= Charles Blake =

Charles Blake may refer to:

- Charles Blake (divine) (1664–1730), English divine and poet
- Charles Blake (surgeon) (1746–1810), British army surgeon
- Charles Henry Blake (1794–1872), British businessman in India, later a property developer and railway company director
- Charles Blake (chess player) (1880–1961), Anglo-Canadian chess player and lawyer
- Charles Edward Blake Sr. (born 1940), American bishop of the Church of God in Christ
- Charles Blake (politician) (born 1983), African-American Democratic member of the Arkansas House of Representatives
