= A Dictionary of the English Language =

1755 dictionary by Samuel Johnson

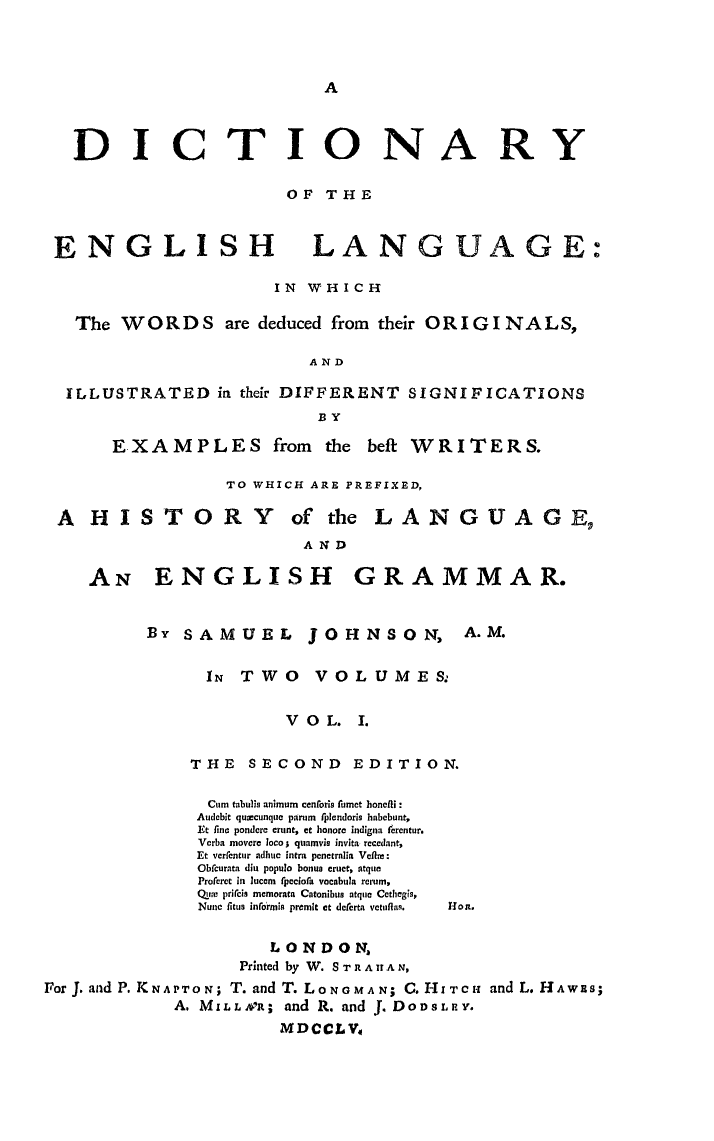
- Title page from the second edition of the Dictionary
- Author: Samuel Johnson
- Language: English
- Subject: Dictionary
- Publisher: consortium
- Publication date: 15 April 1755
- Publication place: Great Britain
- Pages: 2,348
- Text: A Dictionary of the English Language at Wikisource

A Dictionary of the English Language, sometimes published as Johnson's Dictionary, was published on 15 April 1755 and written by Samuel Johnson. It is among the most influential dictionaries in the history of the English language.

There was dissatisfaction with the dictionaries of the period, so in June 1746 a group of London booksellers contracted Johnson to write a dictionary for the sum of 1,500 guineas (£1,575), equivalent to about £300,000 in 2025. Johnson took seven years to complete the work, although he had claimed he could finish it in three. He did so single-handedly, with only clerical assistance to copy the illustrative quotations that he had marked in books. Johnson produced several revised editions during his life.

Until the completion of the Oxford English Dictionary 173 years later, Johnson's was viewed as the pre-eminent English dictionary. According to Walter Jackson Bate, the Dictionary "easily ranks as one of the greatest single achievements of scholarship, and probably the greatest ever performed by one individual who labored under anything like the disadvantages in a comparable length of time".

== Background ==
In earlier times, books had been regarded with something approaching veneration, but by the mid-eighteenth century this was no longer the case. The rise of literacy among the general public, combined with the technical advances in the mechanics of printing and bookbinding, meant that for the first time, books, texts, maps, pamphlets and newspapers were widely available to the general public at a reasonable cost. Such an explosion of the printed word demanded a set pattern of grammar, definition, and spelling for those words. This could be achieved by means of an authoritative dictionary of the English language. In 1746, a consortium of London's most successful printers, including Robert Dodsley and Thomas Longman – none could afford to undertake it alone – set out to satisfy and capitalise on this need by the ever-increasing reading and writing public.

Johnson's dictionary was not the first English dictionary, nor even among the first dozen. Over the previous 150 years more than twenty dictionaries had been published in England, the oldest of these being a Latin-English "wordbook" by Sir Thomas Elyot published in 1538.

The next to appear was by Richard Mulcaster, a headmaster, in 1583. Mulcaster compiled what he termed "a generall table [of eight thousand words] we commonlie use...[yet] It were a thing verie praise worthy...if som well learned...would gather all words which we use in the English tung...into one dictionary..." In 1598, an Italian–English dictionary by John Florio was published. It was the first English dictionary to use quotations ("illustrations") to give meaning to the word; in none of these dictionaries so far were there any actual definitions of words. This was to change, to a small extent, in schoolmaster Robert Cawdrey's Table Alphabeticall, published in 1604. Though it contained only 2,449 words, and no word beginning with the letters W, X, or Y, this was the first monolingual English dictionary. Several more dictionaries followed: in Latin, English, French and Italian. Benjamin Martin's Lingua Britannica Reformata (1749) and Ainsworth's Thesaurus Linguae Latinae (1737) are both significant, in that they define entries in separate senses, or aspects, of the word. In English (among others), John Cowell's Interpreter, a law dictionary, was published in 1607, Edward Phillips' The new world of English words came out in 1658 and a dictionary of 40,000 words had been prepared in 1721 by Nathan Bailey, though none was as comprehensive in breadth or style as Johnson's.

The problem with these dictionaries was that they tended to be little more than poorly organised and poorly researched glossaries of "hard words": words that were technical, foreign, obscure or antiquated. Perhaps the greatest single fault of these early lexicographers was, as historian Henry Hitchings put it, that they "failed to give sufficient sense of [the English] language as it appeared in use." In that sense Dr. Johnson's dictionary was the first to comprehensively document the English lexicon.

Additional for Background Johnson's preparation:

Johnson's dictionary was prepared at 17 Gough Square, London, an eclectic household, between the years of 1746 and 1755. By 1747 Johnson had written his Plan of a Dictionary of the English Language, which spelled out his intentions and proposed methodology for preparing his document. He clearly saw benefit in drawing from previous efforts, and saw the process as a parallel to legal precedent (possibly influenced by Cowell):

I shall therefore, since the rules of stile, like those of law, arise from precedents often repeated, collect the testimonies of both sides, and endeavour to discover and promulgate the decrees of custom, who has so long possessed whether by right or by usurpation, the sovereignty of words.

Johnson's Plan received the patronage of Philip Stanhope, 4th Earl of Chesterfield but not to Johnson's pleasure. Chesterfield did not care about praise, but was instead interested by Johnson's abilities. Seven years after first meeting Johnson to discuss the work, Chesterfield wrote two anonymous essays in The World that recommended the Dictionary. He complained that the English language was lacking structure and argued:

We must have recourse to the old Roman expedient in times of confusion, and choose a dictator. Upon this principle, I give my vote for Mr Johnson to fill that great and arduous post.

However, Johnson did not appreciate the tone of the essay, and he felt that Chesterfield had not made good on his promise to be the work's patron. In a letter, Johnson explained his feelings about the matter:

Seven years, my lord, have now past since I waited in your outward rooms or was repulsed from your door, during which time I have been pushing on my work through difficulties of which it is useless to complain, and have brought it at last to the verge of publication without one act of assistance, one word of encouragement, or one smile of favour. Such treatment I did not expect, for I never had a patron before ... Is not a patron, my lord, one who looks with unconcern on a man struggling for life in the water, and when he has reached ground, encumbers him with help? The notice which you have been pleased to take of my labours, had it been early, had been kind: but it has been delayed till I am indifferent and cannot enjoy it; till I am solitary and cannot impart it; till I am known and do not want it.

== The text ==
A Dictionary of the English Language was somewhat large and very expensive. It was printed as a folio, measuring 16 5/8 × 9 7/8 inches (422 × 251 mm). The paper was of the finest quality available, the cost of which ran to nearly £1,600, (Note: About £313,000 in 2025.) more than Johnson had been paid to write the book. Johnson himself pronounced the book "Vasta mole superbus" ("Proud in its enormous bulk"). No bookseller could possibly hope to print this book without help; outside a few special editions of the Bible no book of this heft and size had ever been set to type.

The title page reads:

A

DICTIONARY
of the
ENGLISH LANGUAGE:
in which
The WORDS are deduced from their ORIGINALS,
and
ILLUSTRATED in their DIFFERENT SIGNIFICATIONS
by
EXAMPLES from the best WRITERS.
To which are prefixed,
A HISTORY of the LANGUAGE,
and AN ENGLISH GRAMMAR.
By SAMUEL JOHNSON, A.M.
In TWO Volumes

VOL. I

The words "Samuel Johnson" and "English Language" were printed in red; the rest was printed in black. The preface and headings were set in 4.6 mm "English" type, the text—double columned—was set in a typeface like Caslon. This first edition of the dictionary contained a 42,773-word list, to which only a few more were added in subsequent editions. One of Johnson's important innovations was to illustrate the meanings of his words by literary quotation, of which there are around 114,000, from around 500 authors. The authors most frequently cited by Johnson include Shakespeare, Milton and Dryden. For example:

OPULENCE

Wealth; riches; affluence

"There in full opulence a banker dwelt,
Who all the joys and pangs of riches felt;
His sideboard glitter'd with imagin'd plate,
And his proud fancy held a vast estate."
-- Jonathan Swift

Furthermore, Johnson, unlike Bailey, added notes on a word's usage, rather than being merely descriptive.

Unlike most modern lexicographers, Johnson introduced humour or prejudice into quite a number of his definitions. Among the best-known are:

- "Excise: a hateful tax levied upon commodities and adjudged not by the common judges of property but wretches hired by those to whom excise is paid"
- "Lexicographer: a writer of dictionaries; a harmless drudge that busies himself in tracing the original and detailing the signification of words"
- "Oats: a grain which in England is generally given to horses, but in Scotland supports the people"

A couple of less well-known examples are:

- "Monsieur: a term of reproach for a Frenchman"
- "Patron: One who countenances, supports, or protects. Commonly a wretch who supports with insolence, and is paid with flattery." which some have understood to be a jab at his patron Philip Stanhope.

He included whimsical little-known words, such as:

- "Writative – A word of Pope's, not to be imitated: "Increase of years makes men more talkative but less writative; to that degree I now write letters but of plain how d'ey's.""

On a more serious level, Johnson's work showed a heretofore unseen meticulousness. Unlike all the proto-dictionaries that had come before, painstaking care went into the completeness when it came not only to "illustrations" but also to definitions as well:

- "Turn" had 16 definitions with 15 illustrations
- "Time" had 20 definitions with 14 illustrations
- "Put" ran more than 5,000 words spread over 3 pages
- "Take" had 134 definitions, running 8,000 words, over 5 pages

The original goal was to publish the dictionary in two folio volumes, A–K and L–Z, but that soon proved unwieldy, unprofitable, and unrealistic. Subsequent printings ran to four volumes; even these formed a stack 10 inches (25 cm) tall, and weighed in at nearly 21 pounds (9.5 kg). In addition to the sheer physical heft of Johnson's dictionary, came the equally hefty price: £4/10/– (equivalent to approximately £880 in 2025). So discouraging was the price that by 1784, thirty years after the first edition was published, when the dictionary had by then run through five editions, only about 6,000 copies were in circulation—an average sale of 200 books a year for thirty years.

Johnson's etymologies would be considered poor by modern standards, and he gave little guide to pronunciation; one example being "Cough: A convulsion of the lungs, vellicated by some sharp serosity. It is pronounced coff". Much of his dictionary was prescriptivist. It was also linguistically conservative, advocating traditional spellings such as publick rather than the simpler spellings that would be favoured 73 years later by Noah Webster.

The dictionary is in alphabetical order according to the eighteenth-century English alphabet. In the eighteenth century, the letters I and J were considered different forms of the same letter; the same with letters U and V. As a result, in Johnson's dictionary the word jargon comes before the word idle, and vagabond comes before ultimate.

In spite of its shortcomings, the dictionary was far and away the best of its day. Its scope and structure were carried forward in dictionaries that followed, including Noah Webster's Webster's Dictionary in 1828 and the Oxford English Dictionary later in the same century.

== Reception history ==
External videos
- Presentation by Jack Lynch on Samuel Johnson's Dictionary: Selections from the 1755 Work that Defined the English Language, 14 January 2004, C-SPAN

=== Initial reception ===
From the beginning there was universal appreciation not only of the content of the Dictionary but also of Johnson's achievement in single-handedly creating it: "When Boswell came to this part of Johnson's life, more than three decades later, he pronounced that 'the world contemplated with wonder so stupendous a work achieved by one man, while other countries had thought such undertakings fit only for whole academies'." "The Dictionary was considered, from the moment of its inception, to be Johnson's, and from the time of its completion it was Johnson's Dictionary—his book and his property, his monument, his memorial."

Immediately after publication "The Dictionary was enthusiastically written up in important periodicals such as the London Magazine and—none too surprisingly—the Gentleman's Magazine. In the latter it received an eight-page notice". Reviews, such as they were, proved generous in tone: "Of the less positive assessments the only properly judicious one came from Adam Smith in the pro-Whig Edinburgh Review ... he wished that Johnson 'had oftener passed his own censure upon those words which are not of approved use, though sometimes to be met with in authors of no mean name'. Furthermore, Johnson's approach was not 'sufficiently grammatical'".

Despite the Dictionary's critical acclaim, Johnson's general financial situation continued in its dismal fashion for some years after 1755: "The image of Johnson racing to write Rasselas to pay for his mother's funeral, romantic hyperbole though it is, conveys the precariousness of his existence, almost four years after his work on the Dictionary was done. His financial uncertainties continued. He gave up the house in Gough Square in March 1759, probably for lack of funds. Yet, just as Johnson was plunging into another trough of despondency, the reputation of the Dictionary at last brought reward. In July 1762 Johnson was granted a state pension of £300 a year by the twenty-four-year-old monarch, George III. The pension did not make him rich, but it ensured he would no longer have to grub around for the odd guinea."

=== Criticism ===
As lexicography developed, faults were found with Johnson's work: "From an early stage there were noisy detractors. Perhaps the loudest of them was John Horne Tooke ... Not content to pronounce it 'imperfect and faulty', he complained that it was 'one of the most idle performances ever offered to the public', that its author 'possessed not one single requisite for the undertaking', that its grammatical and historical parts were 'most truly contemptible performances', and that 'nearly one third ... is as much the language of the Hottentots as of the English'." "Horace Walpole summed up for the unbelievers when he pronounced at the end of the eighteenth century, 'I cannot imagine that Dr Johnson's reputation will be very lasting.' His dictionary was 'a surprising work for one man', but 'the task is too much for one man, and ... a society should alone pretend to publish a standard dictionary.' Notwithstanding Walpole's reservations, the admirers out-numbered the detractors, and the reputation of the Dictionary was repeatedly boosted by other philologists, lexicographers, educationalists and word detectives."

Johnson's dictionary was made when etymology was largely based on guesswork. His Classical leanings led him to prefer spellings that pointed to Latin or Greek sources, "while his lack of sound scholarship prevented him from detecting their frequent errors". For example, he preferred the spelling ache over ake as he wrongly thought it came from the Greek achos. Some of his spelling choices were also inconsistent: "while retaining the Latin p in receipt he left it out of deceit; he spelled deign one way and disdain another; he spelled uphill but downhil, muckhill but dunghil, instill but distil, inthrall but disenthral".

Boswell relates that "A lady once asked him [Johnson] how he came to define pastern as the knee of a horse: instead of making an elaborate reply, as she expected, he at once replied, 'Ignorance, Madam, pure ignorance.'" On the same page, Boswell notes that Johnson's definition of network ("Any thing reticulated or decussated, at equal distances, with interstices between the intersections") "has often been quoted with sportive malignity, as obscuring a thing in itself very plain."

Other than stress indication, the dictionary did not feature many word-specific orthoepical guidelines, with Johnson stating that 'For pronunciation, the best general rule is, to consider those as the most elegant speakers who deviate least from the written sounds' and referring to the irregular pronunciations as 'jargon'; this was subject to coetaneous criticism by John Walker, who wrote in the preface of his Critical Pronouncing Dictionary 'It is certain, where custom is equal, this ought to take place; and if the whole body of respectable English speakers were equally divided in their pronunciation of the word busy, one half pronouncing it bew-ze, and the other half biz-ze, that the former ought to be accounted the most elegant speakers; but till this is the case, the latter pronunciation, though a gross deviation from orthography, will be esteemed the most elegant. Dr. Johnson's general rule, therefore, can only take place where custom has not plainly decided.' Nevertheless, Walker scrupulously followed Johnson's explanations of words, as did many contemporary dictionaries.

=== Influence in Britain ===
Despite the criticisms, "The influence of the Dictionary was sweeping. Johnson established both a methodology for how dictionaries should be put together and a paradigm for how entries should be presented. Anyone who sought to create a dictionary, post-Johnson, did so in his shadow." "In his history of the Oxford English Dictionary, Simon Winchester asserts of its eighteenth-century predecessor that 'by the end of the century every educated household had, or had access to, the great book. So firmly established did it swiftly become that any request for "The Dictionary" would bring forth Johnson and none other.' 'One asked for The Dictionary,' writes Winchester, 'much as one might demand The Bible.'" One of the first editors of the OED, James Murray, acknowledged that many of Johnson's explanations were adopted without change, for 'When his definitions are correct, and his arrangement judicious, it seems to be expedient to follow him.' ... In the end the OED reproduced around 1,700 of Johnson's definitions, marking them simply 'J.'."

In 2005, the Royal Mint issued a commemorative fifty pence coin celebrating the 250th anniversary of the dictionary's publication.

=== Reputation abroad ===
Johnson's influence was not confined to Britain and English: "The president of the Florentine Accademia declared that the Dictionary would be 'a perpetual Monument of Fame to the Author, an Honour to his own Country in particular, and a general Benefit to the Republic of Letters'. This was no empty commendation. Johnson's work served as a model for lexicographers abroad. It is no surprise that his friend Giuseppe Baretti chose to make the Dictionary the model for his Italian—English dictionary of 1760, and for his Spanish dictionary nearly two decades later but there are numerous examples of influence beyond Johnson's own circle. His work was translated into French and German." Further, "In 1777, when Ferdinando Bottarelli published a pocket dictionary of Italian, French and English (the three languages side by side), his authorities for the French and Italian words were the works of the French and Italian academies: for the English he used Johnson."

=== Influence in America ===
The Dictionary was exported to America. "The American adoption of the Dictionary was a momentous event not just in its history, but in the history of lexicography. For Americans in the second half of the eighteenth century, Johnson was the seminal authority on language, and the subsequent development of American lexicography was coloured by his fame." For American lexicographers the Dictionary was impossible to ignore: "America's two great nineteenth-century lexicographers, Noah Webster and Joseph Emerson Worcester, argued fiercely over Johnson's legacy ... In 1789 [Webster] declared that 'Great Britain, whose children we are, and whose language we speak, should no longer be our standard; for the taste of her writers is already corrupted, and her language on the decline.'" "Where Webster found fault with Johnson, Joseph Worcester saluted him ... In 1846 he completed his Universal and Critical Dictionary of the English Language. He defended Johnson's work, arguing that 'from the time of its publication, [it] has been, far more than any other, regarded as the standard for the language'." Notwithstanding the evolution of lexicography in America, "The Dictionary has also played its part in the law, especially in the United States. Legislators are much occupied with ascertaining 'first meanings', with trying to secure the literal sense of their predecessors' legislation ... Often it is a matter of historicizing language: to understand a law, you need to understand what its terminology meant to its original architects ... as long as the American Constitution remains intact, Johnson's Dictionary will have a role to play in American law."

== Folio and abridged editions ==
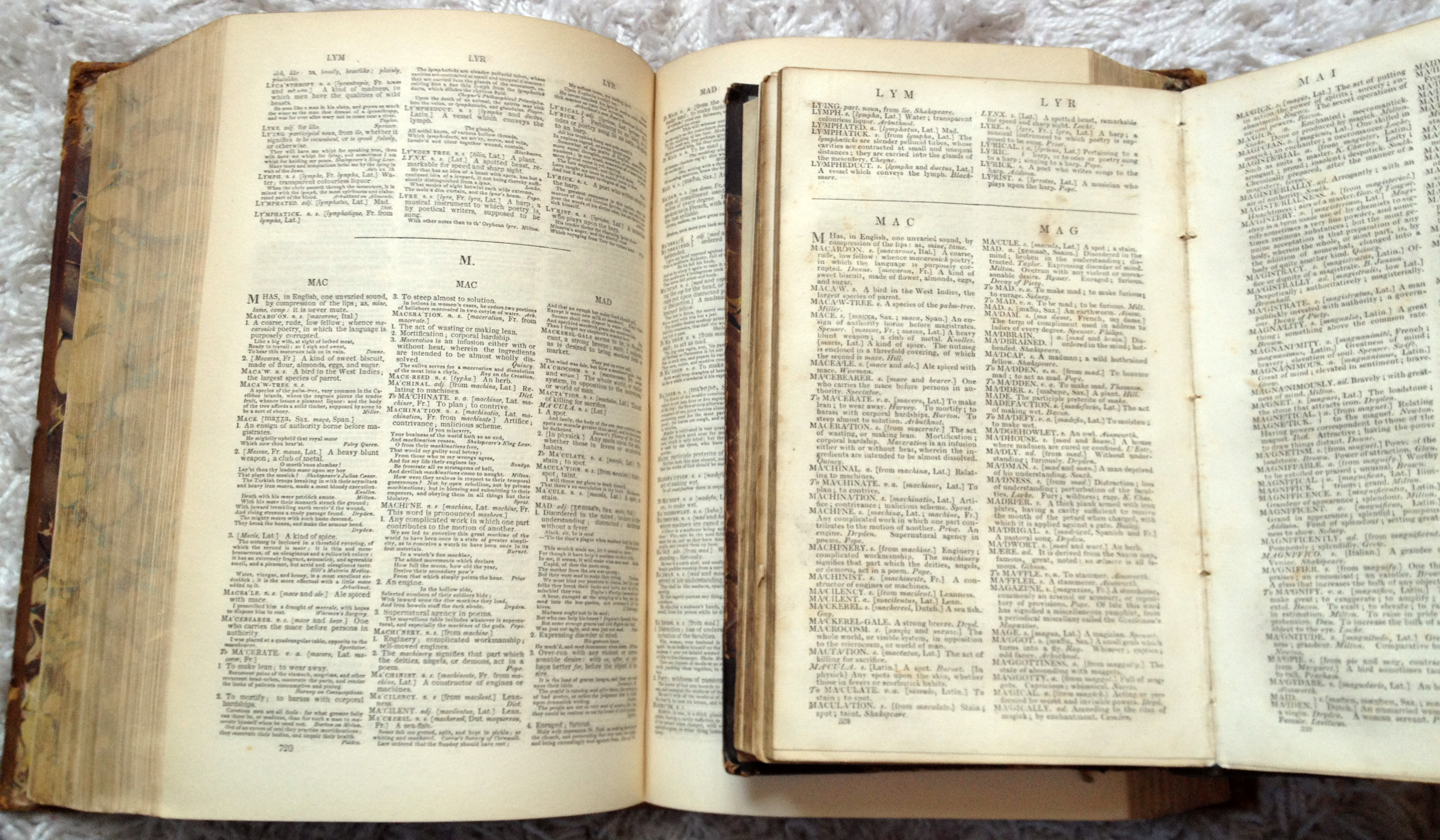
Samuel Johnson's Folio (1755) and Abridged (1756) Dictionaries together

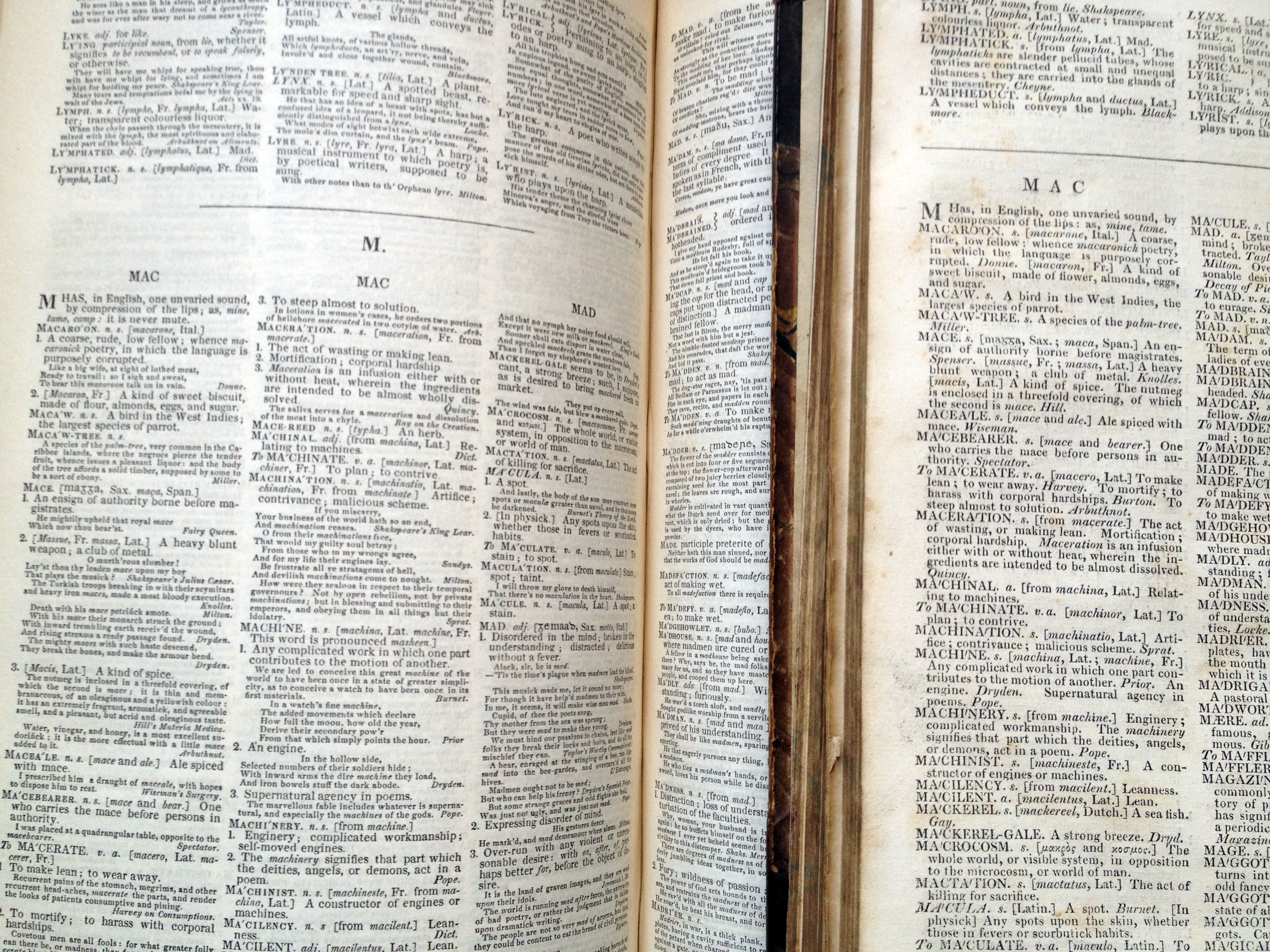
Close up of pages for M entries in the Folio and Abridged Dictionaries of 1755 and 1756 by Samuel Johnson

Johnson's dictionary came out in two forms.

The first was the 1755 Folio edition, which came in two large volumes on 4 April. The folio edition also features full literary quotes by those authors that Johnson quoted, such as Dryden and Shakespeare. It was followed a few weeks later by a second edition published in 165 weekly parts. The third edition was published in 1765, but it was the fourth, which came out in 1773 which included significant revisions by Johnson of the original work.

The Abridged edition came out in 1756 in two octavo volumes with entries, "abstracted from the folio edition by the author", laid out as two columns per page. The abridged version did not feature the literary quotes, just the author quoted. This made it cheaper to produce and buy. It sold over a thousand copies a year for the next 30 years bringing "The Dictionary" to the reach of every literate home.

== Replica editions ==
Johnson's Dictionary has been available in replica editions for some years. The entire first Folio editions of 1755 1st edition and 1773 4th edition are available on Johnson's Dictionary Online, a project funded by the National Endowment for the Humanities and created by a team of scholars at the University of Central Florida. This version is the first fully searchable online edition.

The Preface to the Dictionary is available on Project Gutenberg. In addition, scans of several editions can be found at the Internet Archive:

- 1755 1st edition: Volume 1 (A–K), Volume 2 (L–Z)
- 1768 3rd abridged edition: Single volume (A–Z)
- 1785 6th edition: Volume 1 (A–K), Volume 2 (L–Z)
- 1799 8th edition: Volume 1 (A–K), Volume 2 (L–Z)

== In popular culture ==
In Melville's Moby-Dick, the narrator mentions using Johnson's dictionary to aid him in his leviathanic undertaking: "Fain am I to stagger to this emprise under the weightiest words of the dictionary. And here be it said, that whenever it has been convenient to consult one in the course of these dissertations, I have invariably used a huge quarto edition of Johnson, expressly purchased for that purpose; because that famous lexicographer's uncommon personal bulk more fitted him to compile a lexicon to be used by a whale author like me." (Chapter 104, The Fossil Whale)

At the end of Chapter 1 of Vanity Fair by William Makepeace Thackeray, Becky Sharp disdainfully throws a copy of Johnson's Dictionary out the window.

"Dr. Johnson's Great Dictionary" appears as a plot device in the 1944 Sherlock Holmes film The Pearl of Death, starring Basil Rathbone and Nigel Bruce.

The compilation of Johnson's Dictionary was the main plot-line for an episode of Blackadder the Third where Edmund Blackadder (Rowan Atkinson), after confounding the scholar (played by Robbie Coltrane) with a barrage of fabricated nonexistent words, tries to conceal the destruction of the dictionary's manuscript. Johnson had given his only manuscript to the Prince of Wales and it was presumably destroyed by Blackadder's apprentice dogsbody Baldrick. The manuscript is later found intact, only for Johnson to discover he had forgotten to include the word "sausage". The episode ends with Baldrick throwing the dictionary into a fireplace.

== Sources ==
- Clifford, James Lowry (1979). Dictionary Johnson: Samuel Johnson's Middle Years. New York: McGraw-Hill.
- Collins, H. P. (1974) "The Birth of the Dictionary." History Today (March 1974), Vol. 24 Issue 3, pp 197–203 online.
- Hitchings, Henry (2005). Dr Johnson's Dictionary: The Extraordinary Story of the Book That Defined the World. London: John Murray. ISBN 0-7195-6631-2.
  - US edition: Hitchings, Henry (2005). Defining the World: The Extraordinary Story of Dr. Johnson's Dictionary. New York: Farrar, Straus and Giroux. ISBN 0-374-11302-5.
- Johnson, Samuel (1952). Chapman, R. W. (ed.). The Letters of Samuel Johnson. Oxford: Clarendon Press.
- Johnson, Samuel (2002). Lynch, Jack (ed.). Samuel Johnson's Dictionary: Selections from the 1755 Work that Defined the English Language. Delray Beach, Florida: Levenger Press.
- Lane, Margaret (1975). Samuel Johnson and his World. New York: Harper & Row. ISBN 9780060124960.
- Reddick, Allen (1996). The Making of Johnson's Dictionary 1746–1773. Cambridge: Cambridge University Press.
- Sledd, James H.; Kolb, Gwin J. (1955). Dr. Johnson's Dictionary: Essays in the biography of a book. Chicago: University of Chicago Press.
- Wain, John (1976). Samuel Johnson. New York: McGraw-Hill.
