= Anne Grant =

British writer (1755–1838)

Anne Grant of Laggan
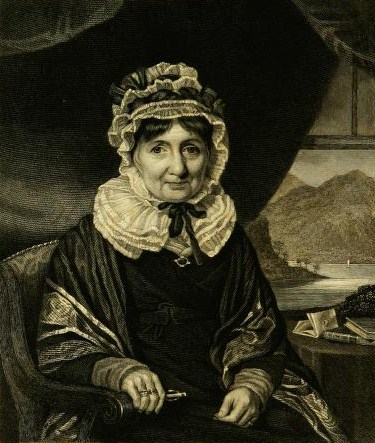
- Born: Anne Macvicar; 21 February 1755; Glasgow, Scotland
- Died: November 7, 1838 (aged 83); Edinburgh, Scotland
- Resting place: New Cemetery of St Cuthbert's churchyard
- Occupation: poet
- Spouse: James Grant (m. 1776)
- Writing career
- Language: English
- Notable works: Memoirs of an American Lady; Letters from the Mountains

Anne Grant often styled Mrs Anne Grant of Laggan (21 February 1755 – 7 November 1838) was a Scottish poet and author best known for her collection of mostly biographical poems Memoirs of an American Lady as well as her earlier work Letters from the Mountains.

She personally exemplified the Scottish Highlands attributes which she admired: "virtuous and dignified poverty, elegance of sentiment that lives in the heart and conduct, and subsists independent of local and transitory modes." (Note: Letters from the Mountains, ed. 1806, vol. i. p. 251.) Her reading seems to have been extensive, but desultory; she had advantages in her personal contacts with the Edinburgh and Quarterly Reviewers.

== Early years and education ==
=== Scotland ===
Anne Macvicar, was born at Glasgow, on 2 February 1755. She was the only child of Duncan Macvicar, a Highland resident, who married in the year 1753 a Stewart of Invernahyle. Grant lived in the mountain home of her maternal ancestors until she was eighteen months old. In the year 1757, Duncan Macvicar, having obtained a commission in the 77th Regiment of Foot, went to North America, leaving his wife and daughter at Glasgow.

=== New York ===
Mrs. Macvicar some time afterwards received his directions to follow him; and accompanied by their daughter, she landed at Charleston, South Carolina, in 1758, and took up her temporary residence at Albany, New York. Mr. Macvicar, having exchanged into the 55th Regiment, was sent down from headquarters at Oswego, New York on Lake Ontario to buy stores, with leave of absence to visit his family. On his return, he took his wife and child with him to the garrison, travelling in a boat up the river. He served in the attack on Ticonderoga, 8 July 1758, when seven of his fellow officers were killed. On the declaration of peace between Great Britain and France in 1762, the 55th Regiment was ordered to New York, previous to embarkation for England.

Returning by the river from Oswego to Albany, the Macvicars became intimate with Madame Margarita Schuyler (1701–1782), who had then left her mansion on The Flats, and purchased a house in that town.. Mr. Macvicar, retiring on half-pay from the army in 1765, received a grant of land from the government, and purchased from two fellow officers their land grants. These lands, lying adjacent, after being cleared, seemed to Mr. Macvicar to be ideal for a fertile and profitable estate. Mr. Macvicar hired men to survey and map his lands, and also at the time reasonably expected that his [sic] Township of Clarendon would in a few years become a very valuable property. Meanwhile, Mr. Macvicar became the tenant of Madame Schuyler’s new house at The Flats, in the township of Claverac, and of a few adjacent acres of land.

At this period of her life, Grant had two homes, usually spending the summer with her parents, presumably at Invernahyle in Scotland, and the winter with Madame Schuyler at Albany. She had lived among Dutch settlers, French Huguenots, English soldiers, African-American slaves, and Mohawk people. She had learned the Dutch language among her young friends at Albany, and had frequented the summer wigwams of the indigenous peoples. She could talk their language sufficiently well to make herself understood by those women and children who were accustomed to European conversations. All this knowledge, Grant had amassed by the time that she was ten years of age.

Her acquaintance with books at that period was proportionately small. Soon after her arrival in America, she had been taught needlework and the elements of reading by her mother, and a soldier had given her lessons in pot-hooks, hangers, and joining-hand. The family Bible, and a Scotch sergeant's copy of Blind Harry's The Wallace were the earliest books to which she had access, and she derived from studying the latter on the banks of Lake Ontario an enthusiastic feeling for Scotland, which lasted through life.

On the voyage back to Albany, from the garrison at Oswego, staying a while at Fort Brewerton, Captain Mungo Campbell, the commander, presented her with an illustrated copy of the Paradise Lost. This, with the aid of a tattered copy of Nathan Bailey's Dictionary, she learned at last to understand. It served her in the first instance as a vocabulary, then as a story book, and subsequently as an incentive to poetical aspirations. At Madame Schuyler’s, Grant became acquainted with Shakespeare, Alexander Pope, Addison, and a few other standard authors. She also took lessons in geography and the use of the globes from the Dutch chaplain. Her principal advantage, however, consisted in oral instructions received from Madame Schuyler, and from listening to the conversations held by her monitress with the military officers

=== Return to Scotland ===
Disgusted with the new settlers, and suffering from rheumatism, Mr. Macvicar suddenly resolved on returning with his wife and daughter to Scotland. His neighbour, Captain John Munro, consented to take charge of the "Township of Clarendon", and with a reasonable expectation of deriving an income from it in a few years, and of securing an ample inheritance for his child, he reappeared in Glasgow in 1768. Shortly after their departure, the American Revolution began, and they never returned, their land being seized by the colonials.

In Glasgow, Grant found several girls of her own age, including two sisters named Pagan, afterwards better known as Mrs. Smith and Mrs. Brown, with whom, during the three following years, she cultivated a friendship. The change of scene and of circumstances provided progress for her education. Her father had again employed himself in commerce, but he resigned that occupation and accepted the appointment of barrack-master at Fort Augustus, in the county of Inverness, in 1773, and immediately removed there with his family.

== Career ==
=== Fort Augustus ===
In Fort Augustus, for six years, Grant lived among the families of the military officers, and the inhabitants of the Strathmore, while practising literary composition in writing letters to her Lowland and other friends, and in occasional sallies of poetry.

The chaplain of Fort Augustus was a young clergyman named James Grant, who, in the year 1776, was presented to the neighbouring living of Laggan. He had no fortune, but was a gentleman by birth, and connected with the families in the county. Anne and James married in May 1779. Her parents, soon after this event, removed to Fort George, Highland, where Mr. Macvicar was appointed barrack-master.

=== Laggan ===
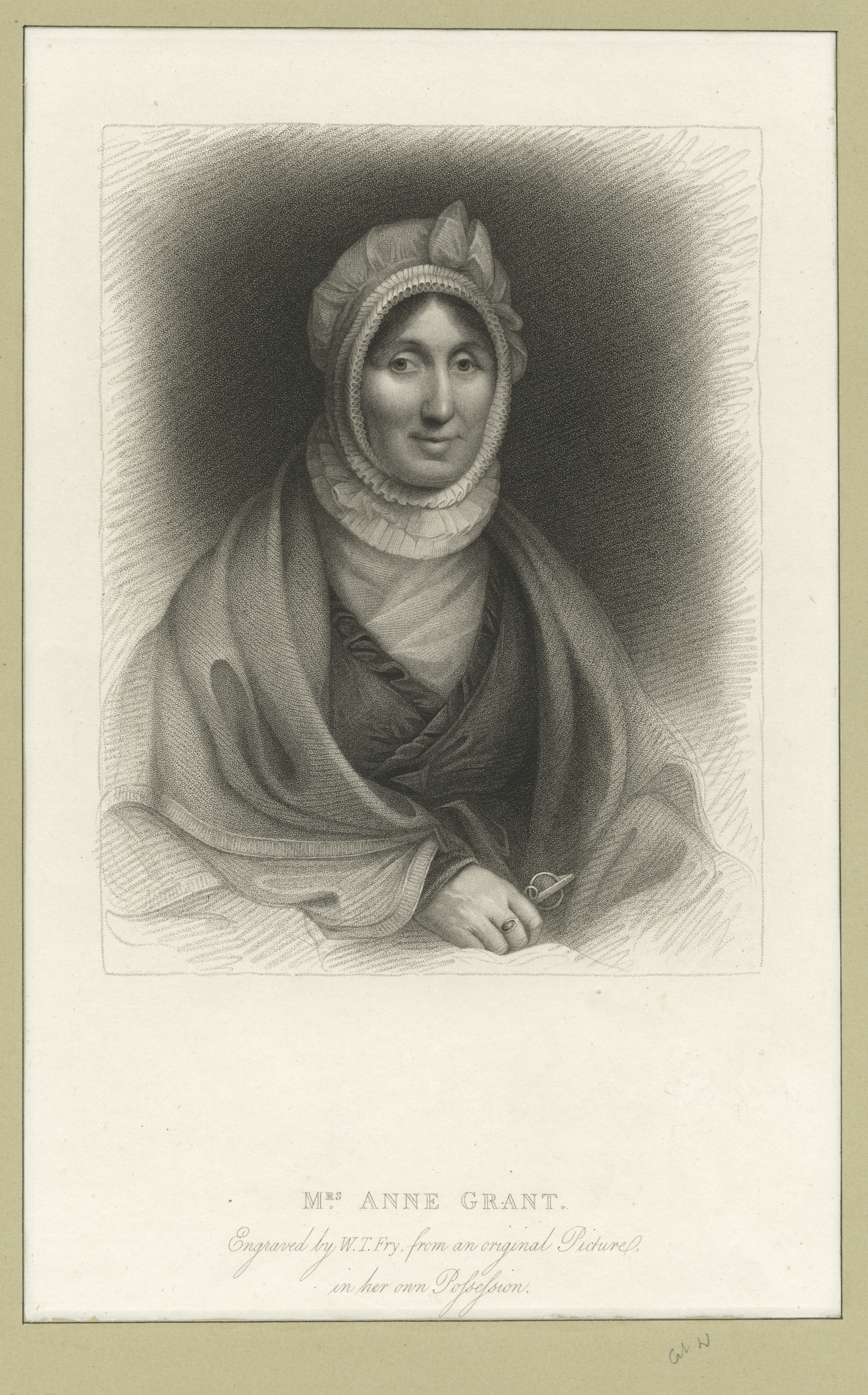
Anne Grant

The Grants lived in Laggan for the next twenty-two years. Their cottage was 55 miles (89 km) from Perth, and the same distance from Inverness, and these were the nearest towns. They rented a small farm from the Duke of Gordon as an additional source of income. Soon after her marriage, Grant received into her family Charlotte Grant, a young girl who was her husband’s relative.

Almost every year, Grant took a few weeks' holiday to visit her family and acquaintances in different parts of the Strathmore, including her parents, and her favourite friends at Glasgow. She acquainted herself with the Gaelic language, and was able not only to speak it with the people, and to understand the religious services which her husband performed in it, but to translate the compositions both of ancient and modern bards. Her travels through the Highlands of Scotland during this time would come to greatly impact her future literary work, which draws heavily on the imagery of the region.

The first great trouble she ever felt was the death of her second son, age four. A year or two afterwards, she also lost twin daughters. Her elder children, usually two or three at a time, generally resided with her parents, who, in 1794, left Fort George, and took a house in the city of Glasgow. There the grandchildren enjoyed many educational advantages. On the death of a favourite companion of her girlhood, Grant took one of the small children into her own home. When Charlotte Grant, who had lived with her since early in her marriage, married early but also died young, Grant took in her child.

When the family estate was absorbed into the new State of Vermont, Grant's financial expectations were severely altered; yet the loss affected her only slightly. The death of her eldest son, John-Lauchlan, at the age of fifteen, was dreadful to her. Its effect was somewhat softened to both parents by the birth of a fourth son a fortnight afterwards, and for eighteen months, although depressed in health and spirits, their domestic happiness was so perfect that Grant subsequently declared that, if she were permitted to select six months out of her whole former life to live over again, she would choose the last six of that period. However, it came to a fearful close: Rev. Grant was attacked by inflammation of the chest, and after three days' illness, he died in 1801. They had been married twenty-two years and of their twelve children, eight survived, six daughters and two sons.

=== Woodend near Stirling ===
In June 1803, she reluctantly left Laggan with her children, and took up residence at Woodend near Stirling, having garden-ground attached to her dwelling and a few acres of pasture-land. Her father died in the same year at Glasgow, and her mother, who had a small pension as an officer’s widow, came to spend the remainder of her life living with her daughter. Grant's only certain income was the small pension due to her as the widow of a military chaplain. The Duke of Gordon considerately permitted her to remain the tenant of his farm for two years after her husband’s death. She was also aided by the kindness of many among her family connections and friends. They collected the original verses and translations which she had previously written and given away, sent them to her for revision, and published them under the patronage of the Duchess of Gordon, three thousand names appearing in the list of subscribers.

Twice within the years 1803, 1804, and 1805, maternal duties summoned Grant to various parts of England, the last of these visits being to London and its vicinity for the purpose of fitting out her third and eldest surviving son, Duncan James, for India, the Right Honourable Charles Grant having obtained a cadetship for his young clansman. To make a comfortable provision for all her children had now become her chief desire, and to further this object she resolved, at the suggestion of her friends, Mrs. Smith, Mrs. Brown, and others, with whom she had kept up a correspondence from her girlhood, to publish the letters which they had preserved. Early in the year 1806, under the title of Letters from the Mountains, those letters were published by Messrs. Longman, and met with extraordinary success. She derived from this work, not only large financial profits, but also many invaluable friendships.

While residing at Woodend she took charge of several little boys as boarders, and among them, at one time was young Morritt of Rokeby. Sir Henry and Lady Steuart were her nearest neighbours. In April 1807, her daughter Charlotte died at the age of seventeen. In July of the same year, her daughter Catherine died, age twenty-five. Grief for these children was mingled with fearful apprehension for the six survivors, as their cases made her fully aware that the insidious illness of their father’s family, consumption, was inherited by their children.

Having kept alive her American remembrances by comparing them with those of her mother, and having enlarged and corrected these conjoint impressions by reading Cadwallader Colden's The History of the Five Indian Nations, and that part of the Travels through the United States of North America by François Alexandre Frédéric, duc de la Rochefoucauld-Liancourt which relates his tour from Upper Canada to New York, she met in London with several near relations of Madame Schuyler, who afforded her the aid of their more accurate knowledge, while she was engaged in finishing the manuscript and correcting the proof-sheets of her Memoirs of an American Lady, which appeared in 1808. It was her largest success and met with a very favourable reception. It provided a description of growing up in pre-revolutionary America and her life with the Schuyler family in Albany who helped raise and educate her. The book also came to inspire other writers and artists interested in the Scottish Highlands, and it often cited as the inspiration for the Scottish folk song Blue Bells of Scotland.

It is not to be doubted, although the observation does not seem to have been uttered or to have got into print, that the Letters from the Mountains were partly indebted for their immediate success to their connection with the birthplace of James Macpherson and the race of Ossian. The Memoirs of an American Lady, also, fell into and harmonised with the recollections of many survivors of the American war, and thus in the first instance, gained favor with the public. Without such introductory circumstances, both works might have failed to excite attention, but, having gained it, their intrinsic merits sufficed to extend and heighten their celebrity. They passed through repeated editions, and were the means of constantly enlarging the circle of her personal friends.

=== Edinburgh ===
In 1809, the Countess of Glasgow having requested her to take charge of her ladyship’s daughter, who was then leaving school, Grant was induced to wish for other pupils of a similar kind, whom her daughters might instruct under her own supervision. With this object in view, she took some steps towards removing to London, but she eventually decided on fixing her residence in Edinburgh, where she took a house in Heriot Row, and removed her family there in March 1810.

In 1811, she published her Essays on the Superstition of the Highlands of Scotland, with Translations from the Gaelic. Towards the close of the same year, her mother, Mrs. Macvicar, died, age 84. The two following years were chiefly spent in training the pupils committed to her care. One of her final large pieces of work was Eighteen Hundred and Thirteen, was published in 1814. It was a lengthy poem about the prospects of a prosperous century for Great Britain. On 14 August of that year, her son, Lieutenant Duncan-James Grant, died at Surat, while engaged in military duty. A few days later, Grant's daughter Anne died.

== Later years ==
Grant did not publish much after 1814, but stayed involved in the literary community and wrote a great deal of correspondence. In the spring of 1815, finding that her house in Heriot Row had become too small for her pupils, Grant removed to a larger one in Prince’s Street. In September 1820, she accidentally slipped down some stone steps, and received an injury which lamed her for life, but did not abate her general health. In 1821, the Highland Society of London awarded her their gold medal for the best "Essay on the Past and Present State of the Highlands of Scotland". On 1 July in the same year, Grant’s youngest daughter, Moore, died at age twenty-five. On 16 June 1823, her daughter Isabella died.

Her standing allowed Grant the rare luxury of being granted a pension from the Civil List in 1825. In 1826, Grant removed her residence to Braehouse, a detached dwelling surrounded by a garden, which better suited her reduced mobility. On 16 November 1827, Mary, her eldest and last surviving daughter, died. Of all her twelve children, only one remained, the youngest son. Her pupils, who loved her so well that they seldom left her home until called upon to establish households of their own, gathered often around her, and habitually showed her the most dutiful attentions. Her books, her school, legacies from deceased friends, and at last a literary pension, placed her late in life in easy circumstances.

== Death and legacy ==
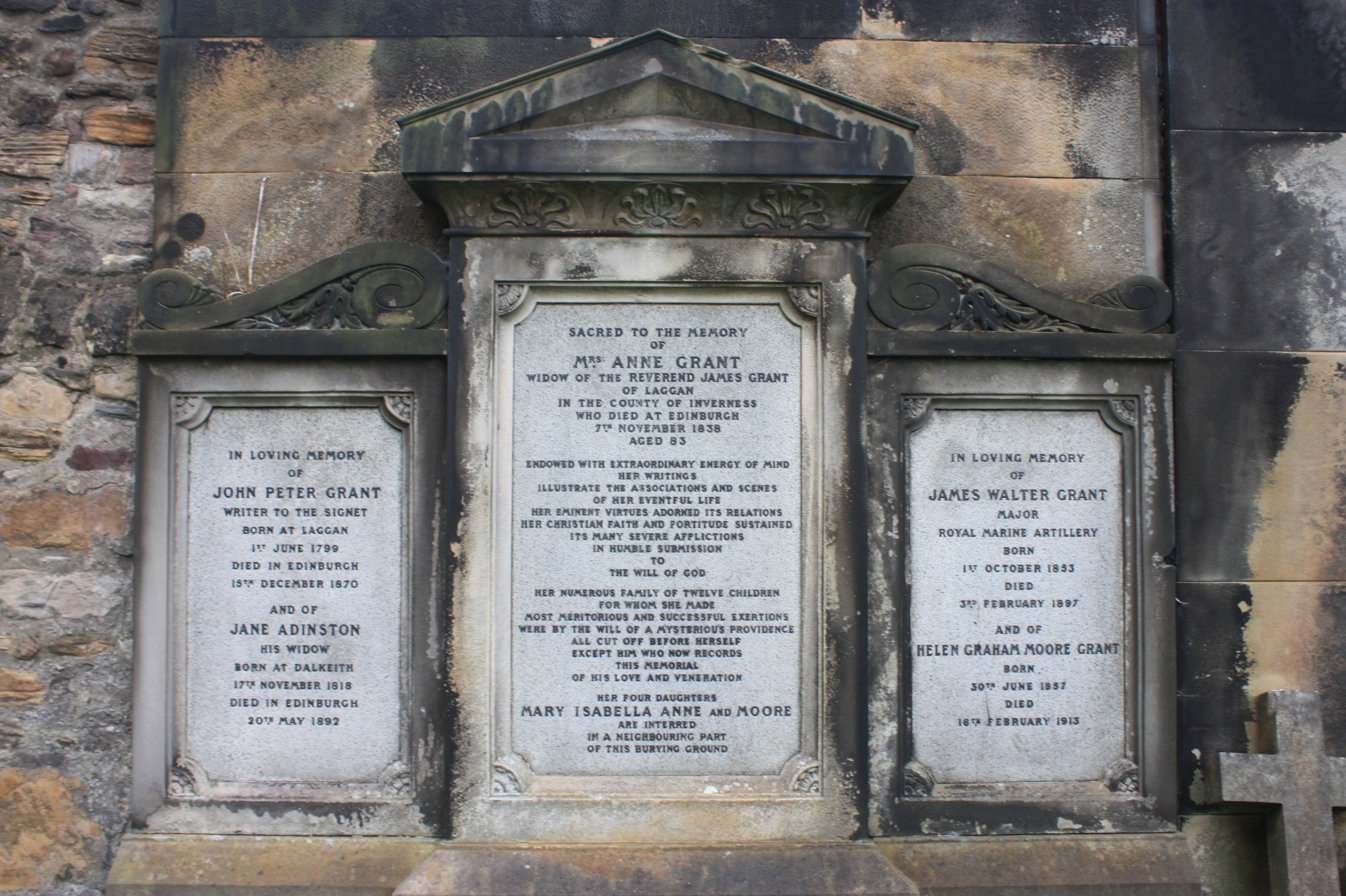
Anne Grant's grave, St Cuthbert's churchyard

In April 1832, on her son’s marriage, she left Braehouse to reside with him. Early in the year 1837, her daughter-in-law died, and she removed to Manor Place. She continued to associate and to correspond with her friends until a few weeks before her death, which occurred on 7 November 1838. She was buried near the graves of four of her daughters in the New Cemetery of St Cuthbert's churchyard in Edinburgh. The grave lies on the outer wall of the southern section, near the south-east corner.

In the year 1844, her Autobiography, and a Series of 'Familiar Letters' from 1803 to 1838, were published, edited by her son John-Peter Grant, writer to the Signet. A number of Grant's manuscripts are preserved in the David Laing collection in the Edinburgh University Library.

== Style ==
There was a want of systematic accuracy in all her compositions. She had little constructive power, and great ability in word-painting from natural objects. Her style failed in precision, though it was seldom deficient in perspicuity. Her syntax was often faulty; her orthography was notoriously incorrect, and wholly at the mercy of the printers. She used many peculiarities of diction, often substituting the preposition "of" for the preposition "for," and making the adverb "whenever" equivalent to "as soon as": for instance, "I am the better of being tenderly cared for, and of three months in the country"-—"Whenever she heard that I was here, she came." Like most Scotch writers of the time, she sometimes misplaced the verbs "will" and "shall."

Every moral and social truth which she knew, and her memory was full of such, had been either directly brought to her by a fact, impressed by a fact, or conjoined with one by way of illustration. All these facts were either incidents of her personal history, or occurrences in the lives of people upon whose traces she had trodden. This realisation of things imparted to her writings an air of freshness and originality, which, atoning for all faults of construction and of style, rendered their perusal in a pleasing manner. It had the same effect in society, where the sagacity of her intellect, the warmth of her heart, her natural ease and fluency of speech, and the refined simplicity of her manners, rendered her an object of interest, and often of admiration.

She was undoubtedly gifted with that faculty of originating ideas which constitutes genius. She versified harmoniously, and rhymed with facility. She had a frank avowal of her sensations and feelings. With admirable impartiality and candour, but with too much severity, Grant asserted that she had "no fountain of inspiration, but a cistern of acquisitions".

== Themes ==
In a letter to Catherine Maria Fanshawe, dated 18 February 1809, Grant said:

"When I first went to the Highlands, I thought it pretty and poetical to admire the general face of the country, and spurred myself up to something like admiration, but it was, without a pun, uphill work. Particular spots charmed me, but the general aspect of the country made me always think myself in a defile guarded by savage and gloomy giants with their heads in the clouds and their feet washed by cataracts; in short, it appeared to me as awful as it would be to live night and day in that mighty Minster that so filled my eyes and my imagination when lately at York. Time, however, went on, and I began to grow a little savage myself: 'not a mountain reared its head unsung;' and, when I grew acquainted with the language and the poetry of the country, I found a thousand interesting localities combined with those scenes where the lovely and the brave of other days had still a local habitation and a name: cherished traditions, and the poetry of nature and the heart shed light over scenes the most gloomy, and peopled solitude with images the most attractive and awakening. When, after a long residence in this land of enthusiasm, I left the abode of ghosts, and warrior-hunters, and heroines, to come down to common life in a flat country, you cannot imagine how bleak and unsheltered, how tame and uninteresting, it appeared".

Again, writing to the same friend, on 17 September 1810, Grant said, in reference to a tour which she had lately made with some English visitors:

"I have seen the Trosachs before, and thought them all that Walter Scott describes; yet till now they produced less of the local interest which pervades all Highland scenery than any other district I know. And why ? Because they were uncelebrated and unsung; and almost every mountain glen and every lnoor that I ever saw or heard of besides is connected with some strain of native poetry, some note of wild music, or some antique legend, that give a local habitation and a name to those forms which float on the memory, or fleet through the imagination. When I first went to the Highlands, and, from not knowing the language or the people, could not taste the charms of their poetry, the sentiments of their music, or the delights of manners more courteous, and conversation more intelligent, than are anywhere else to be met with among rusticsf" when first, I say, I wandered untaught and forlorn amid the desolation of brown heaths and dusky mountains, I was at times charmed with particular scenes, but the general effect was as much lost on me as on these tourists: I was like the ignorant maid who tried her master’s violin all over, and could never find where the tune lay".

Virtue and Company (1875) argued that Grant's appreciation of natural scenery was shaped primarily by literary and historical associations rather than by direct aesthetic response. According to this assessment, Grant became reconciled to mountain heights, glens, and cataracts through their connections with poets and historical figures, and to desert ranges through romantic fiction. The same source noted that Cowper and the Brontës had similarly invested their respective landscapes — the flat pasture lands of Buckinghamshire and the moors of Haworth - with literary significance, though it suggested that such associations were distinct from what it termed a genuine appreciation of natural scenery.

== Discrepancies ==
Having lived among the most eminent literary people of the time, and read all the fashionable books, Grant has thrown into her letters anecdotes, sketches of character, and critical remarks, which add to the interest they possess as records of family biography. Between her fragmentary Autobiography and the statements made in her Letters posthumously published, compared with her Letters from the Mountains, and her Memoirs of an American Lady, many flagrant discrepancies occur. Guided by the rule of always adopting contemporaneous documents in preference to long unwritten reminiscences, while accepting also such subsequent documents as cast a broader light upon preceding ones, this biographical notice has been founded upon the best evidence afforded by her writings.

Her memory was wonderfully good, but she trusted it too implicitly upon other points as well as upon those of her family and personal history. The Letters from the Mountains, and the Memoirs of an American Lady, give totally different accounts of Aunt Schuyler’s birth and parentage. Several passages in the Memoirs are likewise opposed to each other. At page 141 of the Memoirs, Grant states that the old Colonel did not live to witness his eldest son’s marriage with Catalina, which took place in the year 1719. At page 163 of the same volume, she states that this young pair chiefly resided with the old Colonel for two years before his death, which took place in 1721. These inconsistencies, so far as they relate to the Schuylers, may possibly have been rectified in after editions, but strange want of vigilance is manifested by the omission of at least a note to show the reader that the second statement was to be considered as a correction of the first.
