= Nathan Bailey =

British lexicographer and philologist (died 1742)

Nathan Bailey (died 27 June 1742), was an English philologist and lexicographer. He was the author of several dictionaries, including his Universal Etymological Dictionary, which appeared in some 30 editions between 1721 and 1802. Bailey's Dictionarium Britannicum (1730 and 1736) was the primary resource mined by Samuel Johnson for his Dictionary of the English Language (1755).

== Life ==
Bailey was a Seventh Day Baptist, admitted 1691 to a congregation in Whitechapel, London. He was probably excluded from the congregation by 1718. Later he had a school at Stepney. William Thomas Whitley attributes to him a degree of LL.D.

== Works ==
Bailey, with John Kersey the younger, was a pioneer of English lexicography, and changed the scope of dictionaries of the language. Greater comprehensivity became the common ambition. Up to the early eighteenth century, English dictionaries had generally focused on "hard words" and their explanation, for example those of Thomas Blount and Edward Phillips in the generation before. With a change of attention, to include more commonplace words and those not of direct interest to scholars, the number of headwords in English dictionaries increased spectacularly. Innovations were in the areas of common words, dialect, technical terms, and vulgarities. Thomas Chatterton, the literary forger, also obtained many sham-antique words from reading Bailey and Kersey.

Bailey's An Universal Etymological English Dictionary, from its publication in 1721, became the most popular English dictionary of the 18th century, and went through nearly thirty editions. It was a successor to Kersey's A New English Dictionary (1702), and drew on it. A supplementary volume of his dictionary appeared in 1727, and in 1730 a folio edition, the Dictionarium Britannicum containing many technical terms. Bailey had collaborators, for example John Martyn who worked on botanical terms in 1725.

Samuel Johnson made an interleaved copy the foundation of his own Johnson's Dictionary. The 1755 edition of Bailey's dictionary bore the name of Joseph Nicol Scott also; it was published years after Bailey's death, but months only after Johnson's dictionary appeared. Now often known as the "Scott-Bailey" or "Bailey-Scott" dictionary, it contained relatively slight revisions by Scott, but massive plagiarism from Johnson's work. A twentieth-century lexicographer, Philip Babcock Gove, attacked it retrospectively on those grounds. In all, thirty editions of the dictionary appeared, the last at Glasgow in 1802, in reprints and versions by different booksellers.

Bailey's dictionary was also the basis of English-German dictionaries. These included those edited by Theodor Arnold (3rd edition, 1761), Anton Ernst Klausing (8th edition, 1792), and Johann Anton Fahrenkrüger (11th edition, 1810).

Bailey also published a spelling-book in 1726; All the Familiar Colloquies of Erasmus Translated (1733), of which a new edition appeared in 1878; 'The Antiquities of London and Westminster,' 1726; 'Dictionarium Domesticum,' 1736 (which was also a cookbook on recipes, including fried chicken); Selections from Ovid and Phædrus; and 'English and Latin Exercises.' In 1883 appeared 'English Dialect Words of the Eighteenth Century as shown in the . . . Dictionary of N. Bailey', with an introduction by W. E. A. Axon (English Dialect Society), giving biographical and bibliographical details.

== List of selected works ==
- Bailey, Nathan (1704). Dictionarium Rusticum & Urbanicum: Or, A Dictionary of All Sorts of Country Affairs, Handicraft, Trading, and Merchandizing. London: Printed for J. Nicholson, at the Kings-Arms in Little-Britain. OCLC 1063071154.
- Bailey, Nathan (1736). Dictionarium Britannicum Or a More Compleat Universal Etymological English Dictionary Than Any Extant. London: T. Cox.

== Bibliography ==
- Jonathon Green, Chasing the Sun: Dictionary Makers and the Dictionaries They Made (1996)

Attribution:

- This article incorporates text from a publication now in the public domain: "Bailey, Nathan". Dictionary of National Biography. London: Smith, Elder & Co. 1885–1900.
- Works by Nathan Bailey at Project Gutenberg
- Works by or about Nathan Bailey at the Internet Archive
- Selected headwords from Bailey's Dictionary, 1736 edition
