= Alexander Gil the younger =

English headmaster and poet

- Born: 1597
- Died: 1642 (aged 44–45)
- Occupations: Headmaster and poet

Alexander Gil the younger, also spelled Gill, (1597–1642) was an English headmaster and poet. He was the high-master of St. Paul's School.

== Biography ==
Gil was the son of Alexander Gill the elder. He was born, probably at Norwich, in 1597. He obtained a scholarship at St. Paul's School, London, of which his father became highmaster in 1608. He matriculated from Trinity College, Oxford, 26 June 1612; became an exhibitioner of Wadham College in 1612, and bible-clerk there 20 April 1613; proceeded B.A. 1616, and M.A. 1619. He afterwards returned to Trinity, where he took the degrees of B.D. (27 June 1627) and D.D. (9 March 1636–7) (Oxf. Univ. Reg., Oxford Hist. Soc. II. ii. 326, iii. 344). Gill was of very unruly disposition, and was, according to the pamphleteers of the day, on bad terms with the university authorities; but he displayed much skill as a writer of Latin and Greek verse. As early as 1612 he published a Latin threnody on the death of Prince Henry. At Michaelmas 1621 he was appointed under-usher of St. Paul's School. John Milton was among his pupils; a close intimacy sprang up between them, and many of Milton's Latin letters to Gill are preserved. On 20 May 1628 the poet writes in extravagant terms of Gill's Latin verses. On 2 July following he sent Gill some of his own Latin verses for him to criticise and correct. On 4 December 1634 Milton again thanks Gill for a gift of Latin verses. Meanwhile, Gill had fallen into serious trouble, and lost his post at St. Paul's School. He was visiting his friends at Trinity College, Oxford, about Michaelmas 1628, when he drank a health to John Felton, Buckingham's assassin, and made some disrespectful remarks about the king. William Chillingworth, with whom, according to Aubrey, Gill was in the habit of corresponding, was of this party, and deemed it fitting to inform William Laud of what had passed. Gill was committed to the Gatehouse at Westminster (4 September) by Laud's orders, and was examined in the Star-chamber by Laud and Attorney-general Heath on 6 September. Laud's report of the proceedings sent to the king appears in his correspondence (Anglo-Cath. Libr. vii. 16–18). A search at Oxford in the rooms of William Pickering of Trinity College, an intimate friend of Gill, disclosed letters and verses by him (some dated in 1626), abusing Buckingham and Charles I. Gill admitted his guilt, and was sentenced (1 November) to degradation from the ministry, to a fine of 2,000l., and to the loss of both ears (one to be removed at Oxford, and the other in London). Gill's father immediately petitioned for a remission of the sentence, and Edward, earl of Dorset, supported the appeal (Aubrey). Laud, a friend of the elder Gill, consented to mitigate the fine, and to forego the corporal punishment. On 30 November 1630 a free pardon was signed by Charles I. Gill, now dismissed from his ushership, received small gratuities from the governors of St. Paul's School in 1631, 1633, and 1634. He tried to retrieve his reputation by publishing in 1632 a little volume of collected Latin verse, entitled ‘Parerga sive Poetici Conatus,’ containing a fulsome dedication to the king and a profoundly respectful poem to Laud, dated 1 January 1631–2, besides much verse to other royal or noble personages, and odes on the successes of Gustavus Adolphus in Germany.

According to Anthony Wood, Gill obtained temporary employment at the school of Thomas Farnaby in Cripplegate. On 18 November 1635, the day following his father's death, he was elected his father's successor in the high-mastership of St. Paul's School. In 1639 complaints were made of his excessive severity towards a boy named Bennett, and at the end of the year he was dismissed. In the school accounts there is an entry of 13l. 7s. 11d. as ‘charges for displacing Dr. Gill,’ which implies some resistance on his part. On 28 January 1639 Gill appealed to the king to reverse the decision on the ground that it was based on ‘the unjust complaint of a lying, thieving boy’ (Cal. State Papers, Dom. 1639–40, p. 389). The king referred the petition to Archbishop Laud and ‘some other lords.’ The Mercers' Company, the governing body of the school, insisted on their right to deal with Gill as they pleased. Laud argued that Gill could not be removed, according to canon law, without his ordinary's knowledge (Laud, Works, iv. 80–1). But the company gained the day, and Laud's remarks about the canon law formed the subject of the tenth charge brought against him at his trial. Two coarse doggerel poems, headed respectively ‘On Doctor Gill, master of St. Paul's School,’ and ‘Gill upon Gill … uncas'd, unstript, and unbound,’ dwelt on Gill's whipping propensities and savage temper. They were first issued with the ‘Loves of Hero and Leander,’ London, 1651, and reappear in ‘The Rump,’ 1660. Aubrey writes that Dr. Gill had ‘his moods and humours as particularly his whipping fits.’ During his last year at the school Gill was refused the usual extra payments and gratuities allowed by the Mercers' Company to the high-master of St. Paul's. On 22 February 1639 – 1640 a pension of 25l. was granted him, and 50l. was given him later in discharge of his claims. He died at the close of 1642, having ‘taught certain youths privately in Aldergate Street, London, to the time of his death’ (Wood). He was buried in the church of St. Botolph without Aldersgate.

Besides the works noted above, Gill printed

- ‘Arithmeticorum Hanamnēsis’ at the end of N. Simpson's ‘Arithmeticæ Compendium,’ 1623;
- ‘Panthea. In honorem illustriss. spectatiss. omnibus Animi Corporisque Dotibus instructiss. Heroinæ, qua mihi in Terris,’ &c., 4to (Wood);
- ‘A Song of Victory upon the Proceedings and Success of the Wars undertaken by the most puissant King of Sweden,’ in English verse, London, 1632, 4to (Wood).
- Gill's ‘Ἐπίνικιον,’ a poem on Gustavus Adolphus's victories, dated 1631, of which a manuscript copy is among the Tanner MSS. (306) at the Bodleian Library, was reprinted separately from the ‘Parerga,’ according to Wood, and also at the close of ‘A New Starr of the North,’ London, 1632.
- A Latin congratulatory poem on Charles I's return from Scotland, by Gill, was printed by John Waterson in 1641 (four leaves). A copy is at Lambeth (44, E. 1).
- Wood further credits Gill with an elegy on Strafford in 1641, and describes a manuscript book, which ‘I have also seen,’ containing other Latin verses (fifteen poems in all), some addressed to friends, and some descriptive of Gustavus Adolphus's victories. This book does not now seem extant, but its contents are partly represented in manuscript pieces in Corpus Christi College, Oxford, in the Bodleian Library (Tanner MS. 306), and in the British Museum (Burney MS. 368, f. 16). Nine of the pieces mentioned by Wood are also extant with twelve others by Gill (‘Epithalamia,’ an interchange of complimentary verse with Isaac Oliver, verses to Bacon, &c., besides five letters to Laud) in a manuscript volume belonging to Thomas Frewen, esq., of Brickwall Hall, Northiam, Sussex. The volume belonged to Charles Blake, D.D., and was intended for the press (cf. Gent. Mag. 1851, i. 345–7).

Gill and Ben Jonson had a long-standing feud, which began as early as 1623, in consequence of the elder Gill's patronage of George Wither's satires. In the Ashmolean MSS. at the Bodleian Library are some abusive but interesting English verses by Gill on Ben Jonson's ‘Magnetick Lady,’ which Dr. Bliss printed in his edition of Wood's ‘Athenæ’ (ii. 598–599) under the error (afterwards corrected) that they were by the elder Gill. Zouch Townley defended Jonson from Gill's illiberal attack in a short poem (ib.)
