= An Universal Etymological English Dictionary =

1721 dictionary by Nathan Bailey

An Universal Etymological English Dictionary was a dictionary compiled by Nathan Bailey (or Nathaniel Bailey) and first published in London in 1721. It was the most popular English dictionary of the eighteenth century until the publication of Samuel Johnson's massive dictionary in 1755. As an indicator of its popularity, the dictionary reached its 20th edition in 1763 and its 27th edition in 1794. Its last edition (30th) was in 1802. It was a little over 900 pages long. In compiling his dictionary, Bailey borrowed greatly from John Kersey's Dictionarium Anglo-Britannicum (1706), which in turn drew from the later editions of Edward Phillips's The New World of English Words. Like Kersey's dictionary, Bailey's dictionary was one of the first monolingual English dictionaries to focus on defining words in common usage, rather than just difficult words.

== Incomplete etymological research ==
Although Bailey put the word "etymological" in his title, he gives definitions for many words without also trying to give the word's etymology because he does not know what the etymology is. A very high percentage of the etymologies he does give are consistent with what is in today's English dictionaries.

== Supplementary volume ==
In 1727, Bailey published a supplementary volume entitled The Universal Etymological English Dictionary, Volume II. Volume II, almost 900 pages, has some duplication or overlap with the primary volume, but mostly consists of extra words of lesser circulation. It was not as popular as the primary volume. The title page of the supplementary volume says it contains "An additional collection of words (not in the first volume) ALSO an explication of hard and technical words in all arts and sciences... ALSO words and phrases contained in our ancient charters, statutes, and processes at Law ALSO the theology and mythology of the Egyptians, Greeks and Romans...."

== References and external links ==
- Bailey's English Dictionary, 3rd edition, year 1726 (downloadable at Archive.org)
- Bailey's English Dictionary: supplementary volume called Volume II, 3rd edition, year 1737 (downloadable Archive.org)
