= John Phillips (author) =

English author

John Phillips (1631–1706) was an English writer, the brother of Edward Phillips, and a nephew of John Milton.

== Life ==
Anne Phillips, mother of John and Edward, was the sister of John Milton, the poet. In 1652, John Phillips published a Latin reply to the anonymous attack on Milton entitled Pro Rege et populo anglicano. He appears to have acted as unofficial secretary to Milton, but, unable to obtain regular political employment, and (like his brother) chafing against the discipline he was under, he published in 1655, a bitter attack on Puritanism titled a Satyr against Hypocrites (1655). In 1656, he was summoned before the privy council for his share in a book of licentious poems, Sportive Wit, which was suppressed by the authorities, but almost immediately replaced by a similar collection, Wit and Drollery.

In Montelion (1660) he ridiculed the astrological almanacs of William Lilly. Two other skits of this name, in 1661 and 1662, also full of coarse royalist wit, were probably by another hand. In 1678, he supported the agitation of Titus Oates, writing on his behalf, says Anthony Wood, many lies and villanies. Dr Oates's Narrative of the Popish Plot indicated it was the first of these tracts. In the same year he published the first English translation of Jean-Baptiste Tavernier's 'Six Voyages' recounting a lifetime of travel in the Middle East and South Asia.

He began a monthly historical review in 1688, entitled Modern History or a Monthly Account of all considerable Occurrences, Civil, Ecclesiastical and Military, followed in 1690, by The Present State of Europe, or a Historical and Political Mercury, which was supplemented by a preliminary volume giving a history of events from 1688. He executed many translations from the French language, and a version (1687) of Don Quixote, which has been called by Quixote translator Samuel Putnam the worst English translation ever made of the novel. Putnam goes so far as to say in his Translator's Preface that Phillips's version "cannot be called a translation". This is largely because Phillips actually changes the novel by substituting references to famous English locales in place of the original Spanish ones, and including references to things British not found in the original novel.

An extended account of the brothers is given by Wood in Athenæ Oxononienses (ed. Bliss, iv. 764 seq.), where a long list of their works is dealt with. This formed the basis of William Godwin's Lives of Edward and John Phillips (1815), with which was reprinted Edward Phillips's Life of John Milton.
