= Alexander Gill the Elder =

English spelling reformer (1565–1635)

Alexander Gill
- Born: 7 February 1565; Lincolnshire
- Died: 17 November 1635 (aged 70); London
- Resting place: Mercers' Chapel, London
- Other name: Alexander Gil
- Education: Corpus Christi College, Oxford
- Occupations: Scholar, School Master
- Known for: Writing on spelling reform, Teaching John Milton
- Spouse: Elizabeth Gill
- Children: Three

Alexander Gill the Elder (7 February 1565 – 17 November 1635), also spelled Gil, was an English scholar, spelling reformer, and high-master of St Paul's School, where his pupils included John Milton. He was the author of an English grammar, which was written, however, in Latin.

== Life ==
He was born in Lincolnshire 7 February 1565, admitted as a scholar of Corpus Christi College, Oxford, in September 1583, and earned a B.A. in 1586 and an M.A. in 1589. Antony Wood believed that he was a schoolmaster in Norwich, where he was living in 1597. On 10 March 1607-8 he was appointed high-master of St. Paul's School, succeeding Richard Mulcaster. Milton was among his pupils from 1620 to 1625.

He had two sons, George and Alexander (b. 1597), and a daughter, Annah. George Gill would eventually become ordained.

In 1628, his son Alexander was overheard drinking to the health of John Felton, who had stabbed George Villiers, 1st Duke of Buckingham. Buckingham was a favorite of King Charles I, but hated by the public. Felton was widely acclaimed as a hero for assassinating him. Gill the Younger was sentenced to have both ears removed and was fined £2000. However, his father intervened directly with William Laud. This effort managed a remission of the punishment inflicted by the Star Chamber. Alexander Gill the Younger would later become a noted scholar in his own right.

== Death ==
Gill the Elder died at his house in St. Paul's Churchyard 17 November 1635, and was buried 20 November in Mercers' Chapel. He was survived by his wife, Elizabeth.

== Works ==
=== Grammar ===
Logonomia Anglica, qua gentis sermo facilius addiscitur, London, by John Beale, 1619, 2nd edit. 1621, was his English grammar dedicated to James I. Gill's book, written in Latin, opens with suggestions for a phonetic system of English spelling (see below). In his section on grammatical and rhetorical figures Gill quotes freely from Edmund Spenser, George Wither, Samuel Daniel, and other English poets. It was more comprehensive than earlier works, and devoted attention to syntax and prosody. An edition was produced in 1903 by Otto Luitpold Jiriczek; a facsimile of the 1619 edition was published in 1972.

==== Phonetic spelling ====
The following table lays out Gill's proposed system of phonetic spelling:

Letter/grapheme	Name	Example usage	Early Modern Spelling	Modern spelling
Vowels
A a	narrow a	Mal	Mal	Mal
ae	N/A	aerj	aerie	aery
ai	N/A	wai	way	way
au	N/A	paun	paun	pawn
Ä ä	narrow ä	mäl	male	male
A â	broad a	bâl	ball	ball
âu	N/A	âuger	auger	auger
E e	e	beſt	beſt	best
ei	N/A	ei	eye	eye
ϵ ë	ë	ëgl	eagle	eagle
ëi	N/A	hëi	hey	hey
ëu	N/A	fëu	fewe	few
I i	i	kin	kinne	kin
I ï	ï	kïn	keene	keen
ïe	N/A	dïer	dear	dear
J j	j	kjn	kyne	kine
je	N/A	fjer	fire	fire
O o	o	kol	coll	coll
oi	N/A	toiz	toyes	toys
ou	N/A	bou boul	bough bowle	bough bowl
Ꞷ (flipped) ö	ö	köl	coale	coal
öi	N/A	töil	toil	toil
öu	N/A	thröun	throwne	thrown
V v	v	ſvr	ſure	sure
U u	u	ſpun	ſpunne	spun
ui	N/A	akquit	acquit	acquit
uj	N/A	akqujt	acquite	acquite
uoi	N/A	buoi (boi in the north)	boy	boy
ü	ü	ſpün	ſpoone	spoon
üi	N/A	ʒüint büi tüil (or töil)	ioint boy toil	joint buoy toil
Consonants
B b				
D d	dï	dëth	death	death
Ð ð	ðï	ðoħ ðis	though this	though this
F f	ef	fjn	fine	fine
V v	ve	vjn	vine	vine
G g	ga	gud	good	good
Ʒ ʒ	ʒi	baʒ ʒau	badge iawe	badge jaw
H h	he	höli	holy	holy
ħ	eih	boħt	bought	bought
K k	ka	kap	cappe	cap
Q q	qu	quins	quince	quince
L l	el	läzi	laſie	lazy
M m	em	mün	moone	moon
N n	en	tun	tunne	tun
G ng	feeble eng	tung	tongue	tongue
P p	pï	prëch	preach	preach
R r	ar	run	runne	run
S ſ s	eſ	ſun	ſonne or ſunne	son or sun
Sh ſh sh	sha	shau	shawe	shaw
T t	tï	tü	two	two
Th th	thï	thiſtl	thiſtle	thistle
W w	we	wet wich	wette witch	wet witch
wh	whe	which	which	which
X x	ex	ax	ax	axe
Y y	ya	yvth	youth	youth
Z z	ez	zël ðez	zeale theſe	zeal these

Word-final 'ü' is sometimes spelt 'u', as in 'tu chanʒ'.

=== Theological works ===
Gil published two theological works:

- A Treatise concerning the Trinitie of Persons in Unitie of the Deitie (written at Norwich in 1597), London, 1601; reprinted 1635. This was an addressed to Thomas Mannering, described as an Anabaptist.
- Sacred Philosophie of the Holy Scripture, London, 1635, a commentary on the Apostles' Creed.

A further work, referred to in Gil's Sacred Philosophie as "[t]he second part of Logonomia which I call Logicke", is lost. According to Gil, it "was especially meant to be an helpe to them that needed helpe for the understanding of [Sacred Philosophie]". The work which, despite its name, was distinct from Logonomia Anglica, probably dates from the period between the second edition of Logonomia Anglica (1621) and the Sacred Philosophie.
