= A New English Dictionary =

1702 English dictionary

A New English Dictionary: or, a complete collection of the most proper and significant words, commonly used in the language was an English dictionary compiled by philologist John Kersey and first published in London in 1702.

== Differences from previous dictionaries ==
Unlike previous dictionaries, which had focused on documenting difficult words, A New English Dictionary was one of the first to focus on words in common usage. It was also the first to be written by a professional lexicographer.

== Kersey's subsequent works ==
Kersey later continued his lexicographic career by enlarging Edward Phillips' The New World of English Words in 1706 and editing the Dictionarium Anglo-Britannicum in 1708.

== Similarly-titled work ==
The original title of the Oxford English Dictionary was A New English Dictionary on Historical Principles, and it was sometimes given the abbreviation NED, for New English Dictionary.
