= Dictionarium Anglo-Britannicum =

The Dictionarium Anglo-Britannicum is a dictionary compiled by philologist John Kersey, which was first published in London in 1708.

It was the third dictionary he had edited, after his 1702 A New English Dictionary and his 1706 revision of Edward Phillips' 1658 dictionary The New World of English Words. The Dictionarium Anglo-Britannicum is essentially an abridged version of this latter dictionary.
