= Charles Blake (surgeon) =

British army surgeon (1746–1810)

Charles Blake (13 August 1746 – 22 April 1810) was a British army surgeon with the 34th Foot Regiment as part of the force sent to fight the Americans.

Blake arrived in the province of Quebec in the spring of 1776 and was involved in a number of professional roles until after the end of the American Revolutionary War. He remained in Canada when the regiment returned home.
