= Charles Blake (divine) =

English divine and poet

- Born: 1664; Reading, Berkshire
- Died: 22 November 1730 (aged 65–66)
- Occupations: Divine and poet

Charles Blake (1664 – 22 November 1730) was an English divine and poet.

== Biography ==
Blake was born at Reading, Berkshire, being the son of John Blake, ‘gent.,’ of that town. He was educated at the Merchant Taylors’ School and St. John’s College, Oxford, of which he was scholar and afterwards fellow (B.A. 1683, M.A. 1687–8, D.D. 1696). He was domestic chaplain to Sir William Dawes, afterwards bishop of Chester and archbishop of York, who was his close friend. Among his preferments were the rectory of St. Sepulchre’s, London, of Wheldrake in Yorkshire, and of St. Mary's, Hull, and he was successively a prebendary of Chester, a prebendary of York (1716), and archdeacon of York (1720). He died 22 November 1730. He published a small collection of Latin verses, consisting of a translation into Latin of the poem of Musæus on Hero and Leander, and of part of the fifth book of John Milton’s ‘Paradise Lost;’ and two original poems, one called ‘Hibernia Plorans,’ written in 1689, the year of the siege of Londonderry, deploring Ireland's woes, in the style of Virgil's Eclogues, and the other an elegy on the death, in 1688, of Frederick, the Great Elector of Brandenburg. These were all published together in a little sixpenny pamphlet, under the title of ‘Lusus Amatorius, sive Musæi de Herone et Leandro carmen; cui accedunt Tres Nugæ Poeticæ,’ at London in 1693.
