= John Kersey the younger =

John Kersey the younger (fl. 1720) was an English philologist and lexicographer of the late seventeenth and early eighteenth centuries. He is notable for editing three dictionaries in his lifetime: A New English Dictionary (1702), a revised version of Edward Phillips' The New World of English Words (1706) and the Dictionarium Anglo-Britannicum (1708).

As well as being amongst the earliest monolingual English dictionaries, they were also amongst the first to focus on words in common use, rather than on difficult words.

== Life ==
He was son of John Kersey the elder, with whom he has often been confused, and revised the work of his father in the fourteenth edition of the Arithmetic of Edmund Wingate (1720). He, more probably than his father, contributed the Discourse to an unlearned Prince' to the Translation of Plutarch's Morals, which appeared 1684-5 (republished 1870).

He was mainly occupied with lexicography. The sixth edition of Phillips' New World of Words, which was published in 1706, was edited by him (Pref to Dict. Anglo-Britannicum, 1708). He greatly added to the number of words, and published a seventh edition in 1720. Another dictionary, the New English Dictionary, of which the first edition is said to have appeared in 1702 (2nd 1713, 3rd 1731, &c.), was also assigned on the title-page to J. K., but Kersey's responsibility for the work has been questioned. In 1708 was printed his Dictionarium Anglo-Britannicum, comprehending a brief explication of all sorts of difficult words; a new edition in 1715 contained 'words and phrases made use of in our ancient statutes, old records, charters;' the third edition appeared in 1721. About this work, Starnes & Noyes said "Kersey's vocabulary, estimated at 35,000 words, far surpasses that of any preceding dictionary, with the single exception of the folio Kersey-Phillips, which, amazingly enough considering its difference in physical size, it almost equals."

The scholars go on to state that, "Kersey was, obviously, the first outstanding lexicographer. The first decade of the eighteenth century had produced five new dictionaries, and its lexicography had been dominated by the activities of John Kersey. Kersey was...a notable pioneer, rejected outmoded material and methods, working toward modern concepts, and in general playing his role of lexicographer with responsibility and intelligence. He must be credited with the first universal dictionary; with the first abridged dictionary; with the largest, most useful, and most competently executed dictionaries produced up to his time."

From Kersey's Dictionarium Thomas Chatterton borrowed part of his archaic vocabulary.

The date of his death is uncertain.
