= The New World of English Words =

Dictionary by Edward Phillips

The New World of English Words, or, a General Dictionary is an English dictionary compiled by Edward Phillips and first published in London in 1658. It was the first folio English dictionary.

== Contents ==
As well as containing common words, the dictionary featured many unusual words, foreign terms, proper nouns and other specialist terms. In total, the original edition featured 11,000 entries, increasing to 17,000 by the fifth edition in 1696.

It was later revised and enlarged by John Kersey in 1706, eventually containing 38,000 entries. Kersey had already compiled his own dictionary, A New English Dictionary, in 1702, and used this revised edition of The New World of English Words as the basis for his more concise Dictionarium Anglo-Britannicum in 1708.

== Plagiarism ==
At least half of the entries were copied directly, without permission, from Thomas Blount's Glossographia, which had been published a couple of years before. Blount responded by publishing A world of errors discovered in the Interpreter of Hard Words, written against Sir Edward Phillips book entitled A New World in 1673.

== Full title ==
"The New World of English words: Or, A General Dictionary:

Containing the Interpretations of such hard words as are derived from other Languages; whether Hebrew, Arabick, Syriack, Greek, Latin, Italian, French, Spanish, British, Dutch, Saxon, &c. their Etymologies, and perfect Definitions:

Together with all those Terms that relate to the Arts and Sciences; whether Theologie, [...], Fishing, &c.

To which are added the significations of Proper Names, Mythology, and Poetical Fictions, Historical Relations, Geographical Descriptions of most Countries and Cities of the World; especially of these three Nations wherein their chiefest Antiquities, Battles, and other Most Memorable Passages are mentioned; as also all other Subjects that are useful, and appertain to our English Language.

A Work very necessary for Strangers, as well as our own Countrymen, for all Persons that would rightly understand what they discourse, write, or read."

== Bibliography ==
- Barber, Charles Laurence, Early Modern English (Edinburgh: Edinburgh University Press, 1997). ISBN 978-0-7486-0835-5.
- Drake, Miriam A., Encyclopedia of Library and Information Science (2003). ISBN 978-0-8493-3894-6.
- Hüllen, Werner, A History of Roget's Thesaurus: Origins, Development and Design (Oxford: Oxford University Press, 2005). ISBN 978-0-19-928199-2.
- Jackson, Howard, Lexicography: An Introduction (2002). ISBN 978-0-415-23173-2.
