= Richard Mulcaster =

16th-century English educator and politician

Richard Mulcaster (ca. 1531, Carlisle, Cumberland – 15 April 1611, Essex) is known best for his headmasterships of Merchant Taylors' School and St Paul's School, both then in London, and for his pedagogic writings. He is often regarded as the founder of English language lexicography. He was also an Anglican priest.

== Early life ==
Mulcaster was possibly born in 1530 or 1531 in Brackenhill Castle. He was the son of William Mulcaster.

== Education ==
In 1561 he became the first headmaster of Merchant Taylors' School in London, where he wrote his two treatises on education, Positions wherin Those Primitive Circumstances be Examined, which are Necessarie for the Training Up of Children, either for Skill in Their Booke, or Health in Their Bodie (1581) and Elementarie (1582). Merchant Taylors' School was at that time the largest school in the country, and Mulcaster worked to establish a rigorous curriculum which was to set the standard for education in Latin, Greek and Hebrew. He was the mentor of Lancelot Andrewes, later Dean of Westminster, who kept the subject's portrait above his study door.

== Church employments ==
He was vicar of Cranbrook in Kent in 1590, rector of the ancient church of St Margaret's in Stanford Rivers in Essex, and was presented by the Queen as prebendary of Yatesbury in Wiltshire in January 1592.

== Writings ==
Mulcaster’s most enduring work, Elementarie, was published in 1582. For the most part, it is a guide to good practice in teaching, particularly in the teaching of English. At a time when Latin still held all of the prestige in education, Mulcaster made a convincing case for the huge potential of English to serve all of the functions that were at that time reserved for Latin, calling for it to be more widely used and, crucially, respected. Elementarie is, in this respect, a call to national pride: "forenners and strangers do wonder at vs, both for the vncertaintie in our writing, and the inconstancie in our letters." Provoking a movement that was to lead, ultimately, to English being the language of learning in the English-speaking world, the Elementarie argues "I do not think that anie language, … is better able to utter all arguments, either with more pith, or greater planesse, than our English tung is." However, Mulcaster goes on to remind people of the need for the language to be codified and learnt, as Latin had thus far been: only "if the English utterer be as skillfull in the matter, which he is to utter" can English rival Latin.

== Lexicography ==
To the end of establishing an English that could serve the complex needs of education, the Elementarie ends with a list of 8000 "hard words". Mulcaster does not define any of them, but attempts to lay down a standard spelling for them at a time when English lacked universal standardized spellings. Besides making movements toward spelling rules for English (such as the role of the silent e in vowel length in such pairs as mad and made), the list represents a call for English to have its first dictionary, to gather "all the words which we use in our English tung … out of all professions, as well learned as not, into one dictionarie, and besides the right writing, which is incident to the Alphabete, [the lexicographer] wold open vnto us therein, both their naturall force, and their proper use." The first English dictionary A Table Alphabeticall would be published over two decades later, in 1604.

== Football ==
Mulcaster's work Positions (1581) contained an early reference to "footeball", which he differentiated from games involving other parts of the body, namely, "hand ball" and "armeball". He referred to the many benefits of football, stating it had positive educational value and that it promoted health and strength. He described a game for small teams that is organised under the auspices of a referee, and therefore provides early evidence that at the time the game had evolved from disordered and violent "mob" football: "Some smaller number with such overlooking, sorted into sides and standings, not meeting with their bodies so boisterously to trie their strength: nor shouldring or shuffing one another so barbarously ... may use footeball for as much good to the body, by the chiefe use of the legges".

Mulcaster's discussion on football referred to teams ("sides" and "parties"), positions ("standings"), and a coach ("trayning maister"). He was one of the first advocates of the introduction of referees: "For if one stand by, which can judge of the play, and is judge over the parties, & hath authoritie to commande in the place, all those inconveniences have bene, I know, & wilbe I am sure very lightly redressed, nay they will never entermedle in the matter, neither shall there be complaint, where there is no cause."

== Politics ==
Mulcaster was a Member of Parliament for Carlisle in 1559.
