= Edward Phillips =

English author (1630- c.1696)

Edward Phillips (August 1630 – c. 1696) was an English author.

== Life ==
He was the son of Edward Phillips, of the Crown Office in Chancery, and his wife Anne, only sister of John Milton, the poet. Edward Phillips the younger was born in Strand, London. His father died in 1631, and Anne eventually married her husband's successor in the crown office, Thomas Agar. Edward Phillips and his younger brother, John, were educated by Milton. Edward entered Magdalen Hall, Oxford, in November 1650, but left the university in 1651 to work as a bookseller's clerk in London.

Although he did not share Milton's religious and political views, and seems, to judge from the free character of his Mysteries of Love and Eloquence (1658), to have undergone a certain revulsion from his Puritan upbringing, he remained on affectionate terms with his uncle to the end. He was tutor to the son of John Evelyn, the diarist, from 1663 to 1672 at Sayes Court, Deptford, and in 1677–1679 in the family of Henry Bennet, 1st Earl of Arlington, a prominent Roman Catholic. The date of Phillips's death is unknown but his last book is dated 1696.

== Works ==
His most important work is Theatrum poetarum (1675), a list of the chief poets of all ages and countries, but principally of the English poets, with short critical notes and a prefatory Discourse of the Poets and Poetry, which has usually been traced to Milton's hand. He also wrote The New World of English Words (1658), which went through many editions; a new edition of Baker's Chronicle, of which the section on the period from 1650 to 1658 was written by himself from the royalist standpoint; a supplement (1676) to John Speed's Theatre of Great Britain; and in 1684 Enchiridion linguae latinae, said to have been taken chiefly from notes prepared by Milton. John Aubrey states that all Milton's papers came into Phillips's hands, and in 1694 he published a translation of his Letters of State with a valuable memoir.
