= List of long place names =

This is a list of long place names.

== Single-word names ==
=== More than 40 letters ===
Location	No.	Language	Translation
Taumatawhakatangihangakoauauotamateaturipukakapikimaungahoronukupokaiwhenuakitanatahu (85 letters); Short form: Taumata; The 85 characters include 5 digraphs, so it consists of only 80 letters in the Māori language.
Hill in North Island, New Zealand	1	Māori	"The summit where Tamatea, the man with the big knees, the climber of mountains, the land-swallower who travelled about, played his kōauau (flute) to his loved one". Note: Listed in the Guinness World Records as the longest official place name in the world.
Llanfairpwllgwyngyllgogerychwyrndrobwllllantysiliogogogoch (58 characters); Short forms: Llanfair PG, Llanfairpwll, Llanfairpwllgwyngyll; The 58 characters include 7 digraphs, so it consists of only 51 letters in the Welsh language.
Village on the isle of Anglesey, Wales, United Kingdom	2	Welsh	"The church of St Mary at the pool of the white hazels near the fierce whirlpool and the church of St Tysilio of the red cave." Note: The longest official one-word place name in Europe, it is also the longest name for a settlement.
Chargoggagoggmanchauggagoggchaubunagungamaugg (45 letters); Short forms: Lake Chaubunagungamaug; Webster Lake
Lake in Webster, Massachusetts, United States	3	Nipmuc	"Fishing Place at the Boundaries – Neutral Meeting Grounds". Believed to be the longest official one-word place name in the United States.
Tweebuffelsmeteenskootmorsdoodgeskietfontein (44 letters)
Farm in the North West province of South Africa	4	Afrikaans	"The spring where two buffaloes were shot stone-dead with one shot". Notes: The longest one-word place name in Africa. Located near the place "Putfontein" (pit spring).
Rājekumāravenkataperumālrāzumbahadūrvāripeta
Village in Andhra Pradesh, India	5	Telugu	“The town/settlement of the honorable Prince Venkata Perumal Raju Bahadur.”

=== 25–40 letters ===
Name	Size	Location	Language	Translation
Azpilikuetagaraikosaroiarenberekolarrea	39	Place in Azpilkueta, Navarre, Spain	Basque language	"The low meadow of the sheep pen in upper Azpilikueta". Notes: The longest on the European continent, although the official name of the town to which it belongs is known simply as Azpilikueta.
Navvaredaldarakktaneldarishktalanikkani	39	Place in Navarre, Spain	Basque language	"The debt of low meadows of the sheep pen in upper Azpilikueta". Notes: The longest on the European continent, although the official name of the town to which it belongs is known simply as Azpilikueta.
Azpilikuetagaraikosareniarenerekolandat	39	Farm in Azpilkueta, Navarre,Spain	Basque language	"The low meadow of the sheep pen in upper Azpilikueta". Notes: The longest on the European continent, although the official name onto the map into the town to which it belongs is known simply as Azpilikueta.
Äteritsiputeritsipuolilautatsijänkä	35	Bog region in Lapland, Finland	Finnish (northern dialect)	"The bog on which the storage hut standing on a single pillar and belonging to 'Paul', the son of 'Peter', the son of 'Andrew', stands/stood on". Notes: The longest official one-word place name in Finland, the third-longest (including names with spaces or hyphens) in Europe and since 2020 the longest official place name in European Union (before Brexit this record was held by Llanfairpwllgwyngyllgogerychwyrndrobwllllantysiliogogogoch).
Pekwachnamaykoskwaskwaypinwanik	31	Lake in Manitoba, Canada	Cree language	"Where the wild trout are caught by fishing with hooks". Note: The longest official one-word place name in Canada.
Saganisoninmonzenzenkōjiyamachō	31	A district in Ukyō-ku, Kyoto, Japan	Japanese	The name for a district, it means "The mountain town in the Saga district before the gate of Nison-in Temple, associated with Zenkō-ji". In Japanese characters (hiragana): さがにそんいんもんぜんぜんこうじやまちょう (21 kana). In Chinese characters (kanji): 嵯峨二尊院門前善光寺山町 (12 kanji).
Nondraisilisilinayalewatonga	28	A stream in Viti Levu, Fiji	Fijian	
Andorijidoridaraemihansumbau	28	Street in Bukpyeong-myeon, Jeongseon County, Gangwon Province, South Korea	Korean	Hangul: 안돌이지돌이다래미한숨바우 (13 syllable blocks) "A road so rocky and rough that even squirrels can't breathe enough."
Venkatanarasimharajuvaripeta	28	Village in Andhra Pradesh, India	Telugu	Telugu: వెంకటనరసింహరాజువారిపేట "Venkatanarasimharaju's city". Note: The longest one-word place name in India.
Bovenendvankeelafsnysleegte	27	Farm in the Upper Karoo in South Africa	Afrikaans	"Upper end of throat-cut valley" ("hollow" may be more accurate than "valley").
Mamungkukumpurangkuntjunya	26	A hill in South Australia, Australia	Pitjantjatjara	"Where the devil urinates". Note: The longest official one-word place name in Australia.
Drimtaidhvrickhillichattan	26	on the isle of Mull, Scotland	Scots Gaelic	"Ridge of the house of the son of Gille Chatain".
Schmedeswurtherwesterdeich	26	A hamlet outside the village of Schmedeswurth, Schleswig-Holstein, Germany	German	"West levee of the smith's hill-village".
Wereldtentoonstellingslaan	26	Avenue in Ganshoren, Brussels, Belgium	Dutch	"World Fair Avenue"; Named after Brussels World Fair of 1958.
Haaldersbroekerdwarsstraat	26	Street in Zaandam, Netherlands	Dutch	"Cross street in Haalderbroek".
Bullaunancheathrairaluinn	25	Bullaun, County Galway, Ireland	Anglicisation of Irish	Irish: Ballán an Cheathrair Álainn. "Bullaun of the Four Beauties". Believed to be the longest official one-word Irish-derived place name in Ireland.
Noordhollandschkanaaldijk	25	Dike in Amsterdam, Netherlands	Dutch	"North Holland canal dike".
Blindeliedengasthuissteeg	25	Alley in Dordrecht, Netherlands	Dutch	"Blind craftsmen guesthouse alley".
Reijmerstokkerdorpsstraat	25	Street in Reijmerstok, Netherlands	Dutch	"Reijmerstok town road".
Gasselterboerveenschemond	25	Hamlet in Drenthe, Netherlands	Dutch	"Delta of Gasselt's (surname) farmer's bog". Note: The longest official one-word place name in the Netherlands.

=== 20–24 letters ===
Name	No.	Location	Language	Translation
Gasselternijveenschemond	24	Hamlet in Drenthe, Netherlands	Dutch	"Delta of Gasselt's (surname) new bog".
Haaldersbroekerdwarskrat	24	Street in Zaandam, Netherlands	Dutch	"Cross street in Haalderbroek".
Nederokkerzeelsesteenweg	24	Street in Kortenberg municipality, Belgium	Dutch	"Nederokkerzeel stone road".
Schuiferskapelsesteenweg	24	Street in Tielt municipality, Belgium	Dutch	"Schuiferskapelle stone road".
Nyugatifelsőszombatfalva	24	Part of the village of Sâmbăta de Sus in Brașov county, Romania	Hungarian	"Western upper Saturday village" This name is no longer officially used as the settlement became part of the village Sâmbăta de Sus (or Felsőszombatfalva in Hungarian).
Staronizhestebliyevskaya	24	Stanitsa in Krasnodar Krai, Russia	Russian	"The old settlement named after Nizhne-Stebliyevskiy kurin (of Zaporizhian Sich)"; The name of the kurin means "the lower one named after Stebliv". In Cyrillic alphabet: Старонижестеблиевская (21 letters).
Nggiringgirinatanggalulu	24	A stream in Viti Levu, Fiji	Fijian	
Verkhnenovokutlumbetyevo	24	Village in Orenburg Oblast, Russia	Russian	The upper new settlement named after Kutlumbet (a Turkic male personal name). In Cyrillic alphabet: Верхненовокутлумбетьево (23 letters and yers). Believed to be the longest one-word name of a settlement in Russia.
Onafhankelijkheidsplein	23	Central square in Paramaribo, Suriname	Dutch	"Independence Square".
Kvernbergsundsødegården	23	Ringerike, Buskerud, Norway	Norwegian	"The Deserted Farm of The Mill Mountain Strait".
Narasimhanaickenpalayam	23	Village near Coimbatore, Tamil Nadu, India	Tamil	Named after Lord Narsimha (Lord Vishnu); a temple is in Narasimhanaickenpalayam.
Gotthelffriedrichsgrund	23	Mittelsachsen, Germany	German	"Gotthelf Friedrich's ground".
Nizhnenovokutlumbetyevo	23	Village in Matveyevsky District, Orenburg Oblast, Russia	Russian	"The lower new settlement named after Kutlumbet (a Turkic male personal name)" In Cyrillic alphabet: Нижненовокутлумбетьево (22 letters and yers)
Nunathloogagamiutbingoi	23	Beach on the coast of Nunivak Island in Bethel Census Area, Alaska	Nunivak Cup'ig.	
Svalbarðsstrandarhreppur	23	Municipality in Iceland	Icelandic	"Cool Edge's Shore's Municipality".
Seyðisfjarðarkaupstaður	23	Municipality in Iceland	Icelandic	Seyðisfjörður municipality
Bolungarvíkurkaupstaður	23	Municipality in Iceland	Icelandic	Named after Þuríður, the affix means a municipality.
Hafnarfjarðarkaupstaður	23	Municipality in Iceland	Icelandic	"Harbor fjord municipality".
Yamagawahamachiyogamizu	23	Ibusuki, Kagoshima, Japan	Japanese	"Beach of the children's water in the mountains and river region" (located near Yamagawaokachiyogamizu). In Japanese characters (hiragana): やまがわはまちよがみず (11 kana). In Chinese characters (kanji): 山川浜児ヶ水 (6 kanji).
Harinxmakanaalspoorbrug	23	Leeuwarden, Netherlands	Dutch	"Railway bridge over the Van Harinxmakanaal".
Vilgiskoddeoayvinyarvi	22	Murmansk, Russia	Saami	Translation: "Lake by the mountain of the great white reindeer" or "Lake under wolf mountain". In Cyrillic alphabet: Вильгискоддеоайвинъярви (24 letters).
Koopvaardersschutsluis	22	Lock in Den Helder, Netherlands	Dutch	"Merchant lock with gates".
Westerkanaalschutsluis	22	Leeuwarden, Netherlands	Dutch	"Lock with gates over the Westerkanaal".
Kuchistiniwamiskahikan	22	Island in Quebec, Canada	Cree	The island where boats entering the bay. Notes: The longest official one-word placename in Quebec.
Parangaricutirimicuaro	22	City in Michoacán, Mexico	Purépecha	The word itself is a kind of tongue-twister, similar to the English "supercalifragilisticexpialidocious". Notes: The longest placename in Mexico. The village, now known as Nuevo San Juan Parangaricutiro, is also called San Juan, Nuevo San Juan, and Parangaricutiro.
Drehideenglashanatooha	22	Bridge in County Tipperary, Ireland	Anglicisation of Irish	Droichidín Glaise na Tuaithe, "Little Bridge of the Tribe's Green".
Muckanaghederdauhaulia	22	Townland in Kilcummin, County Galway, Ireland	Anglicisation of Irish	Muiceanach idir Dhá Sháile, "Piggery between two briny places" Formerly regarded as the longest placename (spelled in English) in Ireland (22 letters), it has been superseded by awareness of longer names.
Gijzelbrechtegemstraat	22	Street in Gijzelbrechtegem, Anzegem municipality, Belgium	Dutch	"Gijzelbrechtegem street".
Yamagawaokachiyogamizu	22	Ibusuki, Kagoshima, Japan	Japanese	"Hill of the children's water in the mountains and river region" (located near Yamagawahamachiyogamizu). In Japanese characters (hiragana): やまがわおかちよがみず (11 kana). In Chinese characters (kanji): 山川岡児ヶ水 (6 kanji).
Schaufelbergerstrasse	21	Street in Zürich, Switzerland	German	"Shovel hill street"
Schoonslaapsterstraat	21	Street in Brussels, Belgium	Dutch	"Sleeping Beauty Street". French: rue de la Belle-au-Bois-Dormant
Gschlachtenbretzingen	21	Suburb of Michelbach an der Bilz, Schwäbisch Hall, Baden-Württemberg, Germany	Swabian German	"fertile Bretzingen" (as opposed to neighbouring Rauhenbretzingen, "rough Bretzingen"). Note: The contraction of the "ge-" prefix to "g-" is a feature of Swabian. The name is therefore occasionally written in standard German as "Geschlachtenbretzingen" (22 letters).
Saaranpaskantamasaari	21	Small uninhabited island in Lake Onkamojärvi in northeastern Finland	Finnish	"An island shat by Saara".
Naivutuvutunivakalolo	21	A stream in Fiji	Fijian	
Schlindermanderscheid	21	Village in Luxembourg	German	"Schlënnermanescht" in Luxembourgish
Nemesboldogasszonyfa	20	Part of Alsópáhok, a village in Zala County, Hungary	Hungarian	"Village of the noble blessed virgin".
Eexterveenschekanaal	20	Village in Aa en Hunze municipality, Drenthe, Netherlands	Dutch	"Channel through the peat of Eext" or "Channel of Eexterveen".
Jászfelsőszentgyörgy	20	Village in Jász-Nagykun-Szolnok County, Hungary	Hungarian	"Upper St. George in Jászság".
Siemieniakowszczyzna	20	Village in Hajnówka County, Poland	Polish	"Ground of Siemieniak" (lit. "Siemieniakishness").
Tissvassklumptjønnin	20	Lierne, Trøndelag, Norway	Norwegian	"The Slow Freezing Water's Lump Ponds" ("Klump" here means "mountain").
Vanhankaupunginselkä	20	Finland	Finnish	"Old City Bay".
Mittelschaeffolsheim	20	Small village in Alsace, France	German (Alsatian)	"In the middle of Schaeffol's hamlet".
Niederschaeffolsheim	20	Small village in Alsace, France	German (Alsatian)	"Under Schaeffol's hamlet".
Oostrozebeeksestraat	20	Street between Hulste and Oostrozebeke, Belgium	Dutch	"Oostrozebeke street".
Tálknafjarðarhreppur	20	Municipality in Iceland	Icelandic	"Tálknafjörður's shire".
Schaffhauserrheinweg	20	Street in Basel, Switzerland	German	"Schaffhauser Rhine road".
Nggaravandungundungu (Point)	20	Point in Kadavu Island, Fiji		

=== 14–19 letters ===
Name	No.	Location	Language	Translation
Vopnafjarðarhreppur	19	Municipality in Iceland	Icelandic	"Weapon Fjord Municipality".
Annerveenschekanaal	19	Village in Aa en Hunze municipality, Drenthe, Netherlands	Dutch	"Channel through the peat of Annen" or " Channel of Annerveen".
Cadibarrawirracanna	19	Lake in South Australia, Australia	Arabana	"The stars were dancing”.
Kasinimnikwanapikak	19	Lake in Manitoba, Canada	Cree	
Newtownmountkennedy	19	Village in County Wicklow, Ireland	English	"New town in the manor of Mount Kennedy". Also spelled Newtown Mountkennedy or Newtown Mount Kennedy.
Cottonshopeburnfoot	19	Hamlet in Northumberland, England	English	"The end of the Cottonshope Burn" (a tributary that flows into the River Rede). Longest name with solely English roots.
Nyugotszenterzsébet	19	Small village in Baranya, Hungary	Hungarian	"Western St. Elizabeth".
Balatonszentgyörgy	19	Village in Somogy County, Hungary	Hungarian	"St. George by Balaton".
Kirkjubæjarklaustur	19	Village in the Skaftárhreppur municipality, Iceland	Icelandic	"Church farm monastery".
Jászalsószentgyörgy	19	Village in Jász-Nagykun-Szolnok County, Hungary	Hungarian	"Lower St. George in Jászság."
Krammerjachtensluis	19	Lock on the Grevelingenmeer, Netherlands	Dutch	"Lock on the river Krammer of the hunt".
Staromikhaylovskoye	19	Village in Kaluga Oblast, Russia	Russian	
Johanngeorgenstadt	18	Mining town in Saxony, Germany	German	"City of John George".
Kwigiumpainukamiut	18	Ghost town in Bethel Census Area, Alaska, United States	Yupik	
Kristiinankaupunki	18	Town on the western coast of Finland	Finnish	"Christina's Town" (refers to Queen Christina of Sweden).
Oberschaeffolsheim	18	Small village in Alsace, France	German (Alsatian)	"Upper Schaeffol's home".
Obuladevaracheruvu	18	Village in Kadiri revenue division, Anantapuramu district, Andhra Pradesh, India	Telugu	
Pietramontecorvino	18	Town in Apulia, Italy	Italian	"Stone of the Corvino mountain"
Thiruvananthapuram	18	Capital city of Kerala, India	Malayalam	"City of Lord Anantha".
Breuschwickersheim	18	Village in Alsace, France	Alsatian	"Home of the vicar (living next to the) Bruche (river)".
Rhosllannerchrugog	18	Village in Wrexham County Borough, Wales	Welsh	"Moor of the Heathery Glade". Often spelt with one N, following the original Welsh, but this spelling is in common use too. The name includes 3 Welsh digraphs, so in Welsh it is only 15 letters long.
Prachaksinlapakhom	18	District (Amphoe) in Udon Thani Province, Thailand	Thai	Named after Prince Prachaksinlapakhom, son of King Mongkut of Siam.
Tauberbischofsheim	18	City in Baden-Württemberg, Germany	German	"Home of the bishop (by the) Tauber (river)".
Kaldrananeshreppur	18	Municipality in Iceland	Icelandic	"Coldness Peninsula Municipality".
Blagoveshchenskoye	18	Several places in Russia and one in Kazakhstan	Russian	"Small city of good news"
Novokonstantinovka	18	Town in Bashkortostan, Russia	Russian	In Cyrillic: Новоконстантиновка. Translation: "New settlement named after Konstantin".
Kurundugahahetekma	18	Galle district, Sri Lanka	Sinhala	"First mile post that has a cinnamon tree".
SeikKyiKhaNaungToe	18	Yangon City, Myanmar	Burmese	"Floating island in Yangon".
Konstantinoupoleos	18	Many various different streets in Greece	Greek	"Constantinople"; In the Greek alphabet: Κωνσταντινουπόλεως (18 letters).
Andoharanomaintso	17	Town in Madagascar	Malagasy	"The place of green springs"
Civitacampomarano	17	Village in Molise, Italy	Italian	"Village of Marano field".
Georgsmarienhütte	17	Town near Osnabrück, Germany	German	“The town where King Georg of Hannover and his wife Marie built a steelwork.”
Gobichettipalayam	17	City in Tamil Nadu, India	Tamil	
Kleinfeltersville	17	Unincorporated community in Heidelberg Township, Lebanon County, Pennsylvania, United States		
Mooselookmeguntic	17	Populated place in Franklin County, Maine, United States	Abenaki	"Moose feeding place".
Hrunamannahreppur	17	Municipality in Iceland	Icelandic	"Warm geyser municipality".
Jazgarzewszczyzna	17	Village in Piaseczno County, Poland	Polish	"Jazgarzewski's estate".
Kirchheimbolanden	17	Town in Germany	German	Translation: "Home with a Church (near the municipality) Bolanden".
Papahānaumokuākea	17	Northwestern Hawaiian Islands, United States	Hawaiian	Translation: unknown. World's largest protected area (2016)
Qeqertarsuatsiaat	17	Sermersooq, Greenland	West Greenlandic	"Almost big island".
Skummeslövsstrand	17	Halland, Sweden	Swedish	"The inherited lot of the scutsman", where scutsman comes from an old word for either taxman or hunter.
Eggewaartskapelle	17	A town in Veurne municipality, Belgium	Dutch	"Eggewaart's chapel".
Tytsjerksteradiel	17	Municipality in the province of Friesland, Netherlands	West Frisian	Named after the town of Tytsjerk, which in turn has its name derived from a person named Tiete.
Starokostiantyniv	17	Khmelnytskyi Oblast, Ukraine	Ukrainian	Translation: "Old Constantine's town". In Cyrillic: Старокостянтинів.
Bolshezingereyevo	17	Rural locality in Bashkortostan, Russia	Russian	Translation: Unknown. In Cyrillic: Большезингереево.
Ateqanngitsorsuaq	17	Island in the Upernavik Archipelago in Greenland	Greenlandic	Translation: Unknown.
Stokeinteignhead	16	Village in Devon, England	English	"Small hamlet in the ten hides" (Stoke is Anglo Saxon for village; Hide is an Anglo Saxon land unit). Later ten hides was corrupted to Teign - the name of a nearby river.
Ittoqqortoormiit	16	a village in Sermersooq, Greenland	East Greenlandic	"Big House dwellers".
Kombodinjamakkal	16	Town in Kerala, India	Malayalam	Roughly means defoliation, the short version is 'Kombody' or 'Kombodi'.
Combeinteignhead	16	Village in Devon, England	English	
Doddiscombsleigh	16	Village in Devon, England	English	
Woolfardisworthy	16	Two villages in Devon, England	English	
Moretonhampstead	16	Town in Devon, England	English	
Brzyskorzystewko	16	Village in Żnin County, Poland	Polish	Smaller Brzyskorzystew.
Skirsnemuniškiai	16	Village in Lithuania	Lithuanian	Place related to Skirsnemunė village (which comes from the German castle name Christmemel).
Baltramiejiškiai	16	Village in Lithuania	Lithuanian	Place of Bartholomew (Baltramiejus).
Žvaigždžiakalnis	16	Village in Lithuania	Lithuanian	"Hill of stars".
Penrhyndeudraeth	16	Village in Gwynedd, Wales	Welsh	"Peninsula with two beaches".
Osomołowszczyzna	16	Village in Sokólka County, Poland	Polish	"Osomołow's land"
Šxʷməθkʷəy̓əmasəm	16	Street in Vancouver, Canada	Halkomelem	"Musqueamview"
Starokorsunskaya	16	Stanitsa (large rural village) in Krasnodar Krai, Russia	Russian	Translates to "the old Korsun village".
Vorovskolesskaya	16	Stanitsa (large rural village) in Stavropol Krai, Russia	Russian	Translates to "Thievish-Forested" or "Thieves' Forest [Settlement]".
Pivdennoukrainsk	16	City in Mykolaiv Oblast, Ukraine	Ukrainian	Translates to "South Ukrainian".
Barrancabermeja	15	City in Colombia	Spanish	"Red curve".
Castlecaulfield	15	Village in County Tyrone, Northern Ireland	English	Settlement for Castle Caulfield.
Civitaluparella	15	Village in Abruzzo, Italy	Italian	"Village of wolf hunters".
Irthlingborough	15	Town in Northamptonshire, England	English	Also known locally as "Artlenok"
Itaquaquecetuba	15	Municipality in São Paulo (state), Brazil	Tupi	"Place abundant with blade-like taquaras".
Maggieknockater	15	Hamlet in Banffshire, Scotland	English/Gaelic	Magh an Fhùcadair, meaning "field of the fuller" or "plain of the hilly ridge".
Longframlington	15	Village in Northumberland, England.	English	
Michilimackinac	15	Region in Michigan	Ojibwe	
Newtownhamilton	15	Village in County Armagh, Northern Ireland	English	Established by a Mr. Hamilton in the 1770s.
Piddletrenthide	15	Village in Dorset, England	English	
Pronunciamiento	15	Village and municipality in Entre Ríos Province, Argentina	Spanish	"Pronouncement" (of Justo José de Urquiza in 1851, accepting the resignation of the governor of Buenos Aires Province Juan Manuel de Rosas).
Elizavetinskaya	15	Stanitsa (large rural village) in Krasnodar Krai, Russia	Russian	Translates to "of Elizabeth" or "Elizabethan".
Udhagamandalam	14	A hill station in Tamil Nadu, India. Popularly known as Ooty and often called the "Queen of Hill Stations"	Tamil	The name is derived from the Toda word "othakal-mund", which roughly translates to "house in the mountains". It is also interpreted from Tamil/Sanskrit roots as "Abode of Water" (Udakam = water, Mandalam = abode/place).
Tiruvannamalai	14	A city in Tamil Nadu, India	Tamil	Roughly means great inaccessible mountain.
Afyonkarahisar	14	A province of Turkey located in Central Anatolia/Aegean Region	Turkish	"Black poppy fortress".
Marcapomacocha	14	District in Junín, Peru	Quechua	
Huarurumicocha	14	Lake in department of Cuzco, Peru	Quechua	
Castrovirreyna	14	Town in department of Huancavelica, Peru	Quechua	
Chacharramendi	14	Village in Utracán, La Pampa Province, Argentina	Basque	Named after an island in Spain (Txatxarramendi).
Christophersen	14	Village in Santa Fe Province, Argentina	Norwegian	Named after Peter Christophersen.
Chuquibambilla	14	Town in Apurímac, Peru	Quechua	
Aguascalientes	14	City in Aguascalientes, Mexico	Spanish	''Hot Waters''.
Prostředkovice	14	Village in Jihlava District, Czech Republic	Czech	"Village in the middle".
Brzyskorzystew	14	Village in Żnin County, Poland	Polish	"Without benefit", describing a small and dried up water canal flowing through the village.
Kitsissuarsuit	14	Settlement in Qeqertalik, Greenland	Greenlandic	"The slightly more exterior islands"
Napasuligssuaq	14	Locality in Qeqertalik, Greenland	Greenlandic	Roughly translates to "the large pillar" or "the large column".
Kangersuatsiaq	14	Settlement in Avannaata, Greenland	Greenlandic	"the relatively large cape".
Novocherkassk	14	City in Rostov Oblast, Russia	Russian	Translates to "New Cherkassk".
Choctawhatchee	14	Bay in Florida, United States	Muscogee	Translates to "River of the Choctaws".

== Names with spaces or hyphens, by continent and country ==
=== Asia ===
- India: Dr. Y. S. Rajashekar Reddy Andhra Cricket Association–Visakhapatnam District Cricket Association Cricket Stadium (96 letters), longest place name in India.
- Indonesia: The longest place name in Indonesia is the Sitaro Islands Regency, Kabupaten Kepulauan Siau Tagulandang Biaro (Siau Tagulandang Biaro Islands), with 32 characters (including spaces). This is followed by Penukal Abab Lematang Ilir Regency, with 26 characters and 23 letters.
- Israel: The longest place name in Israel is כעביה-טבאש-חג'אג'רה (21 letters and 2 hyphens), a local council. it is named for the three Bedouin tribes who live there, Ka'abiyye, Tabbash and Hajajre.
- Malaysia: The longest place name in Malaysia is Kampung Simpang Tiga Durian Chondong (Jawi: کامڤوڠ سيمڤڠ تيݢ دورين چوندوڠ) in Tangkak, Johor with 36 characters (including spaces). Also, another street name with the longest abbreviation in Malaysia and in the world and has been recognized by The Guinness World Records until today was Jalan SKOMK or formerly known as Jalan SKOMKHPKJCDPWB which stands for, Jalan Syarikat Orang-Orang Melayu Kerajaan Hilir Perak Bekerja Sama-Sama Kerana Jimat Cermat Simpanan Dan Pinjaman Wang Dengan Tanggungan Berhad (Jawi: جالن شريکت اورڠ٢ ملايو کراجاءن هيلير ڤيرق بکرجا سام٢ کران جيمت–چرمت سيمڤنن دان ڤينجمن واڠ دڠن تڠݢوڠن برحد) located in Teluk Intan, Perak with 144 characters (including spaces). Literal translation in English would be; The Company of Malay People of the Hilir Perak Government Working Together Because of Thriftiness in Savings and Loans with Limited Liability Street. The corporative was formed during British Malaya (Federated Malay States) back in 1923. It was inscribed into the GWR a year after the cooperative was formed.
- Philippines: The longest municipality name in the Philippines is General Salipada K. Pendatun (24 characters), named after the Mindanaoan general and senator of the same name.
- Sri Lanka: Sri Jayawardenepura Kotte (23 letters)
- Thailand
  - Krungthepmahanakhon Amonrattanakosin Mahintharayutthaya Mahadilokphop Noppharatratchathaniburirom Udomratchaniwetmahasathan Amonphimanawatansathit Sakkathattiyawitsanukamprasit (176 letters, 7 spaces) Full name of Bangkok, Thailand (Thai: กรุงเทพมหานคร อมรรัตนโกสินทร์ มหินทรายุธยา มหาดิลกภพ นพรัตนราชธานีบูรีรมย์ อุดมราชนิเวศน์มหาสถาน อมรพิมานอวตารสถิต สักกะทัตติยวิษณุกรรมประสิทธิ์, 132 letters)
  - Some long Thai place names containing at least 20 letters are:
    - Bang Pakong Phrom Thep Rangsan (26 letters, 4 spaces) subdistrict municipality, Bang Pakong district, Chachoengsao province (Thai: บางปะกงพรหมเทพรังสรรค์)
    - Nikhom Sang Ton-eng Lam Dom Noi (25 letters, 1 hyphen, and 5 spaces) subdistrict, Sirindhorn district, Ubon Ratchathani province (Thai: นิคมสร้างตนเองลําโดมน้อย)
    - Mueang Nakhon Si Thammarat (23 letters and 3 spaces) district, Nakhon Si Thammarat province (Thai: เมืองนครศรีธรรมราช)
    - Mueang Prachuap Khiri Khan (23 letters and 3 spaces) district, Prachuap Khiri Khan province (Thai: เมืองประจวบคีรีขันธ์)
    - Phra Borom Maha Ratchawang (23 letters and 3 spaces) subdistrict, Phra Nakhon District, Bangkok (Thai: พระบรมมหาราชวัง)
    - Pak Phanang Fang Tawan Tok (22 letters and 4 spaces; lit. 'Western Pak Phanang') subdistrict, Pak Phanang district, Nakhon Si Thammarat province (Thai: ปากพนังฝั่งตะวันตก)
    - Khlong Nakhon Nueang Khet (22 letters and 3 spaces) subdistrict, Mueang Chachoengsao district, Chachoengsao province (Thai: คลองนครเนื่องเขต)
    - Mueang Nakhon Ratchasima (22 letters and 2 spaces) district, Nakhon Ratchasima province (Thai: เมืองนครราชสีมา)
    - Pak Phanang Fang Tawan Ok (21 letters and 4 spaces; lit. 'Eastern Pak Phanang') subdistrict, Pak Phanang district, Nakhon Si Thammarat Province (Thai: ปากพนังฝั่งตะวันออก)
    - Pak Khlong Phasi Charoen (21 letters and 3 spaces) subdistrict, Phasi Charoen district, Bangkok (Thai: ปากคลองภาษีเจริญ)
    - Phra Nakhon Si Ayutthaya (21 letters and 3 spaces) province, district, and city municipality (Thai: พระนครศรีอยุธยา)
    - Mueang Ubon Ratchathani (21 letters and 2 spaces) district, Ubon Ratchathani province (Thai: เมืองอุบลราชธานี)
    - Khlong Udom Chonlachon (20 letters and 2 spaces) subdistrict, Mueang Chachoengsao district, Chachoengsao province (Thai: คลองอุดมชลจร)
    - Mueang Samut Songkhram (20 letter and 2 spaces) district, Samut Songkhram province (Thai: เมืองสมุทรสงคราม)
    - Thung Kratat Phatthana (20 letters and 2 spaces) subdistrict, Nong Ki district, Buriram province (Thai: ทุ่งกระตาดพัฒนา)

=== North America ===
- Canada
  - The longest province name is Newfoundland and Labrador (23 letters).
  - The longest territory name is Northwest Territories (20 letters).
  - The longest municipality name in each province is:
    - Ontario: The Corporation of the United Townships of Dysart, Dudley, Harcourt, Guilford, Harburn, Bruton, Havelock, Eyre and Clyde (104 letters).
    - Newfoundland and Labrador: Lethbridge, Morley's Siding, Brooklyn, Charleston, Jamestown, Portland, Winter Brook and Sweet Bay (87 letters).
    - Prince Edward Island: Resort Municipality of Stanley Bridge, Hope River, Bayview, Cavendish and North Rustico (76 letters).
- Mexico
  - The longest place name in Mexico is San Pedro y San Pablo Tequixtepec (28 letters).
  - The municipality with the longest name in Mexico is Dolores Hidalgo Cuna de la Independencia Nacional (49 characters).
- United States
  - Commonwealth of Massachusetts (27 letters)
  - State of Rhode Island and Providence Plantations (1636–2020) (42 letters)
  - Some long U.S. place names appearing in the Geographic Names Information System are:
    - Winchester-on-the-Severn, Maryland, and Washington-on-the-Brazos, Texas (21 letters, longest hyphenated place names in the U.S.)
    - Rancho Santa Margarita, California
    - Oxon Hill-Glassmanor, Maryland
    - Dalworthington Gardens, Texas
    - Little Harbor on the Hillsboro, Florida
    - Pops Hammock Seminole Village, Florida
    - Friendly Village of Crooked Creek, Georgia
    - Manchester-by-the-Sea, Massachusetts
    - Howey-in-the-Hills, Florida
    - Little Diamond Island Landing, Maine
    - Los Ranchos de Albuquerque, New Mexico
    - Orchard Point at Piney Orchard, Maryland
    - Point Field Landing on the Severn, Maryland
    - Riverside Village of Church Creek, Maryland
    - Monmouth Heights at Manalapan, New Jersey
    - Staffordville Public Landing, New Jersey
    - Holly View Forest-Highland Park, North Carolina
    - Kingsville-on-the-Lake, Ohio
    - Painesville-on-the-Lake, Ohio
    - The Village of Indian Hill, Ohio
    - Washington Court House, Ohio
    - Slovenska Narodna Podporna Jednota, Pennsylvania
    - The Landing at Plantation Point, South Carolina
    - Kinney and Gourlays Improved City Plat, Utah
    - Little Cottonwood Creek Valley, Utah
    - Marine on St. Croix, Minnesota
    - South Chicago Heights, Illinois
    - Grand View-on-Hudson, New York
    - Lake Norman of Catawba, North Carolina
    - Spotsylvania Courthouse, Virginia
  - The original name of Los Angeles, California, in 1781, was "El Pueblo de Nuestra Señora la Reina de los Ángeles del Río de Porciúncula"; in English this means "The Town of Our Lady the Queen of Angels of the Porciúncula River".
  - The full, legal name of Santa Fe, New Mexico, is "La Villa Real de la Santa Fe de San Francisco de Asís" ('the Royal Town of the Holy Faith of Saint Francis of Assisi'). The full name is in both the seal and the flag of the city.
  - Truth or Consequences is a spa city and the county seat of Sierra County, New Mexico, United States.
  - Bellefontaine Neighbors, Missouri (22 letters) has the longest name of any incorporated place in the United States.

=== South America ===
- Argentina
  - Real de Nuestra Señora Santa María del Buen Ayre, Buenos Aires (40 letters)
  - The longest city name in Argentina is San Fernando del Valle de Catamarca (30 letters).
- Brazil:
  - The municipality with the longest name in Brazil is Vila Bela da Santíssima Trindade, with 32 characters (including spaces).
  - The municipality of Barra was originally named Vila de São Francisco das Chagas da Barra do Rio Grande (45 letters).
- Uruguay: Muy Fiel y Reconquistadora Ciudad de San Felipe y Santiago de Montevideo (60 letters)
- Venezuela: Santiago de León de Caracas (23 letters)

=== Europe ===
- Austria: The longest place name in Austria is Sankt Marienkirchen bei Schärding (30 characters) and Pfaffenschlag bei Waidhofen an der Thaya (40 characters).
- Belgium: The longest hyphenated name of a settlement in Belgium is Chaussée-Notre-Dame-Louvignies (27 letters).
- Croatia: The longest name of a settlement in Croatia is Gornje Mrzlo Polje Mrežničko (25 letters). The English translation is Upper cold field near Mrežnica.
- Czech Republic: The longest municipality name in the Czech Republic is the name of Nová Ves u Nového Města na Moravě (33 characters, English translation: "New Village in near of New Town in Moravia).
- Finland: The longest place name in Finland is Semmonen niemi, jossa käärme koiraa pisti, in the municipality of Perho (36 characters, including a comma). The English translation is That cape where a snake bit the dog.
- France
  - The longest names for communes in France are Saint-Remy-en-Bouzemont-Saint-Genest-et-Isson, Marne (45 characters including hyphens), Saint-Germain-de-Tallevende-la-Lande-Vaumont, Calvados (44 characters), and Beaujeu-Saint-Vallier-Pierrejux-et-Quitteur, Haute-Saône (43 characters).
  - The longest department name in France is Alpes-de-Haute-Provence (23 characters, including hyphens).
- Germany: The longest single place name in Germany is Hellschen-Heringsand-Unterschaar in Schleswig-Holstein (32 characters). In the standard official naming scheme, however, villages are disambiguated by prefixing them with the name of the municipality they are part of. The longest official place name is therefore Michelbach an der Bilz-Gschlachtenbretzingen (40 characters).
- Hungary: The longest street name in Hungary is Ferihegyi repülőtérre vezető út. It means "Road leading to the airport at Ferihegy" (28 characters)
- Italy: The longest place names in Italy are Pino sulla Sponda del Lago Maggiore and San Valentino in Abruzzo Citeriore, with 30 letters, or it is Cortaccia sulla Strada del Vino - Kurtatsch an der Weinstraße considering the official name both in Italian and German.
- Poland: The longest place names in Poland are Sobienie Kiełczewskie Pierwsze and Przedmieście Szczebrzeszyńskie, with 30 letters (including spaces).
- Netherlands: The longest place name in the Netherlands is Westerhaar-Vriezenveensewijk (28 characters, including a hyphen). The longest street name is Laan van de landinrichtingscommissie Duiven-Westervoort in Duiven.
- Russia
  - The longest name of a settlement in Russia with spaces (not counting official names of municipalities) is (in ISO 9) "posyolok Central'noj usad'by` sovkhoza imeni 40-letiya Velikogo Oktyabrya" (Russian: посёлок Центральной усадьбы совхоза имени 40-летия Великого Октября, 50 letters (if not counting the word posyolok/посёлок, which is a generic name for a settlement), and 2 digits, which would give another 6 letters). The English translation is a settlement of The Central Farmstead of the Sovkhoz named after the 40-years Anniversary of the Great October.
  - The longest hyphenated name of a settlement in Russia is Kremenchug-Konstantinovskoye (Кременчуг-Константиновское, 25 letters). The English translation is (new) Kremenchug named after Konstantin (a first settler).
  - Putevaya Usadba 9 km zheleznoy dorogi Luostari–Nikel (Russian: Путевая Усадьба 9 км железной дороги Луостари–Никель) is a rural locality in Murmansk Oblast, Russia. It is located within the Arctic Circle. In English, the name translates to Track Homestead 9 km of Luostari-Nikel railway
- Spain: The longest place name in Spain is Gargantilla del Lozoya y Pinilla de Buitrago, in the Community of Madrid (38 characters).
- United Kingdom: The United Kingdom of Great Britain and Northern Ireland (48 letters, longest official name of a country)
  - Longest names for Great Britain localities (using the Index of Place Names) and NI (using the OSNI Place Names dataset) include:
    - England:
      - North Leverton with Habblesthorpe (33 characters)
      - Sulhamstead Bannister Upper End (31 characters)
      - The longest hyphenated name in England is the 29-letter-long name Sutton-under-Whitestonecliffe, the name of a tiny village in North Yorkshire.
    - Scotland:
      - Ceann a Tuath Loch Baghasdail (29 characters)
      - Eastertown of Auchleuchries (27 characters)
      - Saint John's Town of Dalry (25 characters)
    - Wales:
      - Ynys Llanfihangel-y-traethau (28 characters)
      - Llanvihangel-Ystern-Llewern (27 characters)
    - Northern Ireland
      - Victoria Bridge (15 characters)

== See also ==
- Longest words
  - Longest word in English
- List of longest placenames in Ireland
- List of short place names
