= Longest words =

Longest words in various languages

The longest word in any given language depends on the word formation rules of each specific language, and on the types of words allowed for consideration.

Agglutinative languages allow for the creation of long words via compounding. Words consisting of hundreds, or even thousands of characters have been coined. Even non-agglutinative languages may allow word formation of theoretically limitless length in certain contexts. An example common to many languages is the term for a very remote ancestor, "great-great-.....-grandfather", where the prefix "great-" may be repeated any number of times. The examples of "longest words" within the "Agglutinative languages" section may be nowhere near close to the longest possible word in said language, instead a popular example of a text-heavy word.

Systematic names of chemical compounds can run to hundreds of thousands of characters in length. The rules of creation of such names are commonly defined by international bodies, therefore they formally belong to many languages. The longest recognized systematic name is for the protein titin, at 189,819 letters. While lexicographers regard generic names of chemical compounds as verbal formulae rather than words, for its sheer length the systematic name for titin is often included in longest-word lists.

Longest word candidates may be judged by their acceptance in major dictionaries such as the Oxford English Dictionary or in record-keeping publications like Guinness World Records, and by the frequency of their use in ordinary language.

== Agglutinative and polysynthetic languages ==
=== Azerbaijani ===
In Azerbaijani, which is an agglutinative language, there is theoretically no limit on word compounding.
An example is the 42-letter word Elektrikləşdirdiklərimizdənsinizmişcəsinə; pronounced [elektɾiklæʃdiɾdiklæɾimizˈdænsinizmiʃdʒæsinæ], which translates to "As if you were from those ones we have electrified".
There is a shorter more well-known 32-long word, which is a tongue twister, too — Elektrikləşdirilmişlərdənsinizmi?; pronounced [elektɾiklæʃdiɾilmiʃlæɾˈdænsinizmi] meaning "Are you from the ones who are electrified?".

==== Word formation ====
Azerbaijani	English
Elektrik	Electric
Elektrikləş	(To) get electrified
Elektrikləşdir	(To) electrify
Elektrikləşdirdik	We have electrified
Elektrikləşdirdiklərimiz	The ones we have electrified
Elektrikləşdirdiklərimizdən	From the ones we have electrified
Elektrikləşdirdiklərimizdənsiniz	You are from the ones we have electrified
Elektrikləşdirdiklərimizdənsinizmiş	You were from the ones we have electrified
Elektrikləşdirdiklərimizdənsinizmişcəsinə	As if you were from the ones we have electrified
Elektrikləşdirdiklərimizdənsinizmişcəsinəbanpo	As have you were from the ones we have electrified

=== Basque ===
The longest Basque toponym is Azpilicuetagaraicosaroyarenberecolarrea (40) which means "The lower field of the sheepfold (located in) the height of Azpilicueta".

=== Esperanto ===
Since Esperanto allows word compounding, there are no limits on how long a word can theoretically become. An example is the 39-letter word oranĝ-kanton-pafil-limig-aktivul-malamanto, meaning "Orange County gun control activist hater". Such clusters are not considered good style (the 8-word alternative oranĝkantona malamanto de aktivuloj por limigo de pafiloj is more standard), but they are permissible under the rules of Esperanto grammar. Hyphens are optional in Esperanto compounds, so oranĝkantonpafillimigaktivulmalamanto is also technically a valid spelling.

Disregarding compounding, conjugation, and affixes, the longest Esperanto word formally recognized by the Akademio de Esperanto is the 15-letter proper noun Konstantinopolo (Constantinople). The next longest recognized words are the following 13-letter words:

- administracio (administration),
- aŭtobiografio (autobiography),
- diskriminacio (discrimination),
- konservatorio (conservatory),
- paleontologio (palaeontology),
- paralelogramo (parallelogram), and
- trigonometrio (trigonometry).

The longest word found in the dictionary Plena Ilustrita Vortaro as of its 2020 edition is the 24-letter proper noun Meklenburgio-Antaŭpomerio (the German state Mecklenburg-Vorpommern), followed by the 21-letter word proviantadministracio (rations administration).

As of April 2024, the longest word found in the Tekstaro de Esperanto text corpus is the 66-letter word unue-volapukista-poste-esperantista-poste-idista-poste-denove-esperantista, meaning "first-volapukist-then-esperantist-then-idist-then-again-esperantist", which was used in a review published in Monato in 1997 to describe František Lorenz. However, this word does not follow normal Esperanto word formation rules. Other long words found in Tekstaro de Esperanto that follow regular word formation include:

- sescent-kvindek-mil-kvadratkilometra (consisting of 650 000 square kilometers), 33 letters, used in an Esperanto version of a 2011 article by Marc Lavergne in Le Monde diplomatique,
- tragedio-komedio-historio-pastoraloj (tragical-comical-historical-pastorals), 33 letters, used in L. L. Zamenhof's 1893 translation of Hamlet,
- Nord-Atlantik-Traktad-Organizo (North Atlantic Treaty Organization), 27 letters, more commonly translated with two words: Nord-Atlantika Traktat-Organiz(aĵ)o.

=== Estonian ===
- Sünnipäevanädalalõpupeopärastlõunaväsimatus meaning "afternoon untiredness of a weekend birthday party" which is 43 letters.
- 31 lettered word of uusaastaöövastuvõtuhommikuidüll [uːsɑːstaøːvastuvɤtuhomikuidyl] meaning "morning idyll after the new year".
- There is also the 25 letter long word of põllumajandusministeerium which is "Ministry of Agriculture".
- The word kuulilennuteetunneliluuk meaning "the hatch a bullet flies out of when exiting a tunnel" is 24 letters long and a palindrome. It could be one of the longest palindromes.

=== Finnish ===
Examples of long words that have been in everyday use in the Finnish language are kolmivaihekilowattituntimittari which means "three-phase kilowatt hour meter" (31 letters), liikekannallepanotarkastuskierros ("mobilization inspection round", 33 letters), peruspalveluliikelaitoskuntayhtymä ("a public utility of a municipal federation for provision of basic services", 34 letters), and lentokonesuihkuturbiinimoottoriapumekaanikkoaliupseerioppilas "airplane jet turbine engine auxiliary mechanic non-commissioned officer student" (61 letters), an actual military term, although one which has been deprecated. The longest military term in current use is vastatykistömaalinosoitustutkakalustojärjestelmäinsinöörierikoisupseeri "counter-artillery targeting radar systems engineer specialist officer" with 71 characters, with 2 more if grammatically incorrect extra hyphens added for readability are counted. If conjugated forms are allowed, even longer real words can be made. Allowing derivatives and clitics allows the already lengthy word to grow even longer, although the usability of the word starts to degrade. Because Finnish uses free forming of composite words, new words can even be formed during a conversation. One can add nouns after each other without breaking grammar rules.

If one allows artificial constructs as well as using clitics and conjugated forms, one can create even longer words: such as kumarreksituteskenteleentuvaisehkollaismaisekkuudellisennesk- enteluttelemattomammuuksissansakaankopahan (102 letters), which was created by Artturi Kannisto.

The longest non-compound (a single stem with prefixes and suffixes) Finnish word recognised by the Guinness Book of Records is epäjärjestelmällistyttämättömyydellänsäkäänköhänkään (see also Agglutination#Extremes), based on the stem järki (reason, sanity), and it means: "I wonder if – even with his/her quality of not having been made unsystematized".

Äteritsiputeritsipuolilautatsijänkä and a defunct bar named after it, Äteritsiputeritsipuolilautatsi-baari, are the longest place names in use.

=== Greenlandic ===
The longest word in Greenlandic is Nalunaarasuartaateeraaranngualioqatigiiffissualioriataallaqqissupilorujussuanngortartuinnakasinngortinniamisaalinnguatsiaraluallaqqooqigaminngamiaasiinngooq, which has 156 letters. The rough translation of this word is: "There were reports that they apparently – God knows for how many times – once again had considered whatever I, my poor condition despite, still could be considered to be quite adept and resourceful as initiator to put a consortium together for the establishment of a range of tiny radio stations." The word is a tongue twister that forms an entire sentence, rather than being a word or phrase commonly heard in Greenland.

Inuussutissarsiorsinnaajunnaarnersiutilik, consisting of 41 letters, is the longest singular word in the Greenlandic dictionary.

=== Hungarian ===
Megszentségteleníthetetlenségeskedéseitekért, with 44 letters, is the longest word in the Hungarian language, and approximately means "for your [plural] continued behaviour as if you could not be desecrated". It is already morphed, since Hungarian is an agglutinative language. For instance összetöredezettségmentesíthetetlenségeskedéseitekért, with 52 letters shares most of the postfixes of the original word, but changed the base word to tör (break in english).

The Hungarian language has many causes for writing words together, but there are a few rules for avoiding undisciplined length, resulting in unreadability.

Words with less than six syllables can be written in one. Agglutinated words have to be separated by one dash, if they are more than six syllables altogether. If there are more than two words that are already written with a dash and more are needed, a new dash must be used to add it (like C-vitamin-adagolás, meaning "Vitamin C rationing"). In cases where two long words would be written, it may be advised that they be used separately (possible: békeszerződéstervezet-kidolgozás meaning "peace agreement plan–elaboration", but advised rather a békeszerződés tervezetének kidolgozása meaning "the elaboration of the plan of the peace agreement").

The longest dictionary form word is the word megszentségtelenített, with 21 characters (although it ultimately derives from the word szent meaning: "saint" or "sacred"), and it means "desecrated" or "profaned".

=== Indonesian ===
The longest word in the language is ketidakbertanggungjawabannyalah at 31 letters long, which translates to "his lack of taking responsibility that does something" or "his irresponsibility that causes something".

Word	Translation
tanggung jawab	responsibility
bertanggung jawab	to take responsibility, to be responsible
tidak bertanggung jawab	to be irresponsible
ketidakbertanggungjawaban	irresponsibility
ketidakbertanggungjawabannya	his irresponsibility
ketidakbertanggungjawabannyalah	his irresponsibility is the cause of [...]

The longest dictionary word, according to Kamus Besar Bahasa Indonesia, is heksakosioiheksekontaheksafobia, a 31-letter-long word meaning "hexakosioihexekontahexaphobia" or "the phobia of the number 666" in English. while the longest non-scientific word in the dictionary is mentransmigrasilokalkan, which is 23 letters long, meaning "conducting transmigration within the boundaries of a single region or area" in English.

=== Korean ===
There is some disagreement about what is the longest word in the Korean language, which arises from a misunderstanding of the Korean language. All of these examples below contain spaces in Hangul and do not qualify as a single word.

The longest word appearing in the Standard Korean Dictionary published by the National Institute of the Korean Language is 청자 양인각 연당초상감 모란 문은구 대접 (靑瓷陽印刻蓮唐草象嵌牡丹文銀釦대접); Revised Romanization: cheongjayang-in-gakyeondangchosang-gammoranmuneun-gudaejeop, which is a kind of ceramic bowl from the Goryeo dynasty; that word is 17 syllable blocks long, and contains a total of 46 hangul letters. However, to call this a word would be incorrect. It simply consists of many words that act as adjectives for the one word 대접.

The word 니코틴아마이드 아데닌 다이뉴클레오타이드 (nikotin-amaideu adenin dainyukeulle-otaideu), a phonetic transcription of "nicotinamide adenine dinucleotide", has a larger number of syllable blocks (19) but a smaller number of letters (41). It does not qualify as a single word.

In proper nouns, many Korean monarchs have overly long posthumous names built from many different Sino-Korean nouns describing their positive characteristics, for example Sunjo of Joseon, whose full posthumous name is the 77-syllable-block 순조 선각 연덕현도 경인순희 체성응명흠광석경계천배극융원돈휴의행소윤희화준렬대중지정 홍훈철 모건시태형창 운홍기고명박후강건수정계통수력 공유범문안무정영경 성효대왕 (sunjoseongag-yeondeoghyeondogyeong-insunhuicheseong-eungmyeongheumgwangseoggyeong-gyecheonbaegeug-yung-wondonhyuuihaengsoyunhuihwa-junlyeoldaejungjijeonghonghuncheolmogeonsitaehy-eongchang-unhong-gigomyeongbaghugang-geonsujeong-gyetongsulyeoggong-yubeommun-anmujeong-yeong-gyeongseonghyodaewang). This is simply writing the phrase in Hanja (Hanzi) 純祖先覺淵德顯道景仁純禧體聖凝命欽光錫慶繼天配極隆元敦休懿行昭倫熙化峻烈大中至正洪勳哲謨乾始泰亨昌運弘基高明博厚剛健粹精啓統垂曆建功裕範文安武靖英敬成孝肅皇帝, being transliterate in Hangul. It is not a single word and does not qualify as a lexical entry.

=== Malay ===
Malay, just like Indonesian, is an agglutinative language (at least in the formal language) and it belongs to the Austronesian language family. The longest word in Malay is mempertanggungjawabkan, which is 22 letters long, meaning "to give responsibility to" in English.

=== Mongolian ===
A popular example of the longest suffixed word in Mongolian is "Цахилгаанжуулалтыхантайгаа" (tsakhilgaanjuulaltykhantaigaa) which is 26 letters long. Here is a table showing, with translations, which suffixes are added.

Word	Translation
Цахилгаан (tsakhilgaan)	electricity (power)
Цахилгаанжуул (juul)	electrify
Цахилгаанжуулалт (alt)	electrification
Цахилгаанжуулалтын (yn)	electrifications
Цахилгаанжуулалтыхан (ykhan)	electricians
Цахилгаанжуулалтыхантай (tai)	with electricians
Цахилгаанжуулалтыхантайгаа (gaa)	do (action) with electricians

=== Norwegian ===
According to Guinness Book of Records (2001), the longest meaningful word used in Norwegian is minoritetsladningsbærerdiffusjonskoeffisientmålingsapparatur (63 letters), meaning devices for measuring coefficients of diffusion of carriers of minority charges. Nouns, and also verbs and adjectives, can be prefixed as qualifiers to other words quite freely, e.g. to make an unlikely, but understandable and grammatically correct, compound word like damplokomotivfyrbøteraspirantluemerkeprodusentdatterkinoavtaletidspunkt, an agreed meeting time for a cinema date with a daughter of a producer of hat badges for trainees aiming to become firemen on steam locomotives.

=== Ojibwe ===
The longest word in the Ojibwe language is miinibaashkiminasiganibiitoosijiganibadagwiingweshiganibakwezhigan (66 letters), meaning "blueberry pie". This literally translates to "blueberry cooked to jellied preserve that lies in layers in which the face is covered in bread".

=== Tagalog ===
Tagalog can make long words by adding on affixes, suffixes, and other root words with a connector.

The longest published word in the language is pinakanakakapagngitngitngitngitang-pagsisinungasinungalingan, with 59 letters. This compound word means "to keep making up a lie that causes the most extreme anger while pretending you are not."

=== Turkish ===
Turkish, an agglutinative language, carries the potential for words of arbitrary length.

Muvaffakiyetsizleştiricileştiriveremeyebileceklerimizdenmişsinizcesine, at 70 letters, has been cited as the longest Turkish word. It was used in a contrived story designed to use this word. The word means "As if you would be from those we can not easily/quickly make a maker of unsuccessful ones" and its usage was illustrated as follows:

Kötü amaçların güdüldüğü bir öğretmen okulundayız. Yetiştirilen öğretmenlere öğrencileri nasıl muvaffakiyetsizleştirecekleri öğretiliyor. Yani öğretmenler birer muvaffakiyetsizleştirici olarak yetiştiriliyorlar. Fakat öğretmenlerden biri muvaffakiyetsizleştirici olmayı, yani muvaffakiyetsizleştiricileştirilmeyi reddediyor, bu konuda ileri geri konuşuyor. Bütün öğretmenleri kolayca muvaffakiyetsizleştiricileştiriverebileceğini sanan okul müdürü bu duruma sinirleniyor, ve söz konusu öğretmeni makamına çağırıp ona diyor ki: Muvaffakiyetsizleştiricileştiriveremeyebileceklerimizdenmişsinizcesine laflar ediyormuşsunuz ha? We are in a teachers' training school that has evil purposes. The teachers who are being educated in that school are being taught how to make unsuccessful ones from students. So, one by one, teachers are being educated as makers of unsuccessful ones. However, one of those teachers refuses to be maker of unsuccessful ones, in other words, to be made a maker of unsuccessful ones; he talks about and criticizes the school's stand on the issue. The headmaster who thinks every teacher can be made easily/quickly into a maker of unsuccessful ones gets angry. He invites the teacher to his room and says "You are talking as if you were one of those we can not easily/quickly turn into a maker of unsuccessful ones, huh?"

Other well-known very long Turkish words are:

- Çekoslovakyalılaştıramadıklarımızdanmışsınızcasına means "As if you are one of those people whom we could not turn into a Czechoslovak".
- Afyonkarahisarlılaştırabildiklerimizdenmişsinizcesine means "As if you are one of the people that we made resemble from Afyonkarahisar". (Afyonkarahisar is a city in Turkey.)

==== Word formation ====
Turkish	English
Muvaffak	Successful
Muvaffakiyet	Success
Muvaffakiyetsiz	Unsuccessful ('without success')
Muvaffakiyetsizleş(-mek)	(To) become unsuccessful
Muvaffakiyetsizleştir(-mek)	(To) make one unsuccessful
Muvaffakiyetsizleştirici	Maker of unsuccessful ones
Muvaffakiyetsizleştiricileş(-mek)	(To) become a maker of unsuccessful ones
Muvaffakiyetsizleştiricileştir(-mek)	(To) make one a maker of unsuccessful ones
Muvaffakiyetsizleştiricileştiriver(-)	(To) easily/quickly make one a maker of unsuccessful ones
Muvaffakiyetsizleştiricileştiriverebil(-mek)	(To) be able to make one easily/quickly a maker of unsuccessful ones
Muvaffakiyetsizleştiricileştiriveremeyebil(-mek)	To be able to not make one easily/quickly a maker of unsuccessful ones
Muvaffakiyetsizleştiricileştiriveremeyebilecek	One who is not able to make one easily/quickly a maker of unsuccessful ones
Muvaffakiyetsizleştiricileştiriveremeyebilecekler	Those who are not able to make one easily/quickly a maker of unsuccessful ones
Muvaffakiyetsizleştiricileştiriveremeyebileceklerimiz	Those whom we cannot make easily/quickly a maker of unsuccessful ones
Muvaffakiyetsizleştiricileştiriveremeyebileceklerimizden	From those we can not easily/quickly make a maker of unsuccessful ones
Muvaffakiyetsizleştiricileştiriveremeyebileceklerimizdenmiş	(Would be) from those we can not easily/quickly make a maker of unsuccessful ones
Muvaffakiyetsizleştiricileştiriveremeyebileceklerimizdenmişsiniz	You would be from those we can not easily/quickly make a maker of unsuccessful ones
Muvaffakiyetsizleştiricileştiriveremeyebileceklerimizdenmişsinizcesine	As if you would be from those we can not easily/quickly make a maker of unsuccessful ones

== Fusional, analytic, and isolating languages ==
=== Afrikaans ===
Afrikaans, as it is a daughter language of the Dutch language, is capable of forming compounds of potentially limitless length in the same way as in the Dutch language. According to the Total Book of South African Records, the longest word in the language is Tweedehandsemotorverkoopsmannevakbondstakingsvergaderingsameroeperstoespraakskrywerspersverklaringuitreikingsmediakonferensieaankondiging (136 letters), which means "issuable media conference's announcement at a press release regarding the convener's speech at a secondhand car dealership union's strike meeting". This word, however, is contrived to be long and does not occur in everyday speech or writing.

=== Arabic ===
Currently, the longest word in Arabic is the 16-letter-long word أَفَإِستَسقَينَاكُمُوهما. Which means "Did we ask you to let us drink them both?" However, according to some online sources the 20-letter-long word أَفَيَسْتَكْتِبونَكُمانيهِما is the longest word in Arabic meaning "Are they forcing you to write both of them?". Regardless, official sources supporting such a stance cannot be found.

=== Bengali ===
Currently, the longest word in Bengali is the 33-letter-long আত্মশক্তিকরণেরসময়সীমাবদ্ধতার্থীয়তারপ্রতিবন্ধিতাক্ষরিতাবিশেষজ্ঞান, which translates to "The Boundary of Time for Self-Empowerment and Specialized Knowledge for its Corresponding Characters". Another long word often cited is the 11-letter-long অঘটনঘটনপটীয়সী, which means "one who is very skilled in doing unexpected things" or "skilled at unexpected incidents".

=== Bulgarian ===
The Bulgarian online etymological dictionary claims that longest word in Bulgarian to be the 39-letter-long непротивоконституционствувателствувайте (neprotivokonstitutsionstvuvatelstvuvayte), introduced in the Constitution of Bulgaria of 1947 (Dimitrov Constitution). The word means "do not perform actions against the constitution" (addressed to more than one person).

=== Catalan ===
The longest word in Catalan is considered to be Anticonstitucionalment, an adverb meaning "[done in a way that is] against the constitution", however, the scientific word Psiconeuroimmunoendocrinologia, related to endocrinology, has been proposed by the University of Barcelona to be the true longest word.

=== Croatian ===
The longest known word in Croatian is prijestolonasljednikovičičinima, meaning "to those who belong to the throne successor's little wife." The 30-letter word ("lj" is considered as one letter in Croatian) is the dative case of prijestolonasljednikovičica "the throne successor's little wife" which is the diminutive of prijestolonasljednikovica "the throne successor's wife."

=== Czech ===
Traditionally, the word nejneobhospodařovávatelnějšími ("of the least cultivable", 28 letters) is considered as the longest Czech word, but there are some longer artificial words. Most of them are compound adjectives in dative, instrumental or other grammatical case and derived from the iterative or frequentative verbal form or the ability adjective form (like "-able").

- Nejnezdevětadevadesáteroroznásobovávatelnějšími (47; Instrumental case of the ones least multipliable by a group of ninety-nine on a regular basis)
- Nejnezdevětadevadesáteroroznásobovávatelnější (Those who are the least multiplable by a group ninety-nine on a regular basis)
- Nejzdevětadevadesáteroroznásobovávatelnější (Those who are the most multiplable by a group ninety-nine on a regular basis)
- Zdevětadevadesáteroroznásobovávatelnější (Those who are more multiplable by a group ninety-nine on a regular basis)
- Zdevětadevadesáteroroznásobovávatelní (Those who are multiplable by a group of ninety-nine on a regular basis)
- Zdevětadevadesáteroroznásobovávat (Alternative of "multiply out by a group of ninety-nine on a regular basis")
- Zdevětadevadesáteroroznásobovat (Multiply out by a group of ninety-nine on a regular basis — continuous grammatical aspect)
- Zdevětadevadesáteroznásobovat (Multiply by ninety-nine on a regular basis – continuous grammatical aspect)
- Zdevětadevadesáteroznásobit (Multiply by a group of ninety-nine once)
- Zdevětadevadesáteronásobit (Multiply by a group of ninety-nine)
- Devětadevadesátero (A group of ninety-nine)
- Devětadevadesát (Inverse of devadesát devět = ninety-nine)

=== Danish ===
Danish, like many Germanic languages, is capable of compounding words to create ad hoc compounds of potentially limitless length. Nevertheless, the constructed word speciallægepraksisplanlægningsstabiliseringsperiode – which means "a period of stabilising the planning of a specialist doctor's practice" – was cited in 1993 by the Danish version of the Guinness Book of World Records as the longest word in the Danish language at 51 letters long. It is however not possible (using Google) to find a text, which actually uses this word, except for in the context of discussing the longest Danish word.

=== Dutch ===
Dutch, like many Germanic languages, is capable of forming compounds of potentially limitless length. The 49-letter word Kindercarnavalsoptochtvoorbereidingswerkzaamheden, meaning "preparation activities plan for a children's carnival procession", was cited by the 1996 Guinness Book of World Records as the longest Dutch word.

The longest word in the authoritative Van Dale Dutch dictionary (2009 edition) in plural form is meervoudigepersoonlijkheidsstoornissen; 38 letters long, meaning "multiple personality disorders". The entry in the dictionary however is in the singular, counting 35 letters.

The free OpenTaal dictionary, which has been certified by the Dutch Language Union (the official Dutch language institute) and is included in many open-source applications, contains the following longest words, which are 40 letters long:

- vervoerdersaansprakelijkheidsverzekering, "carriers' liability insurance";
- bestuurdersaansprakelijkheidsverzekering, "drivers' liability insurance";
- overeenstemmingsbeoordelingsprocedures, "conformity assessment procedures" (38 letters)

The word often said to be the longest in Dutch – probably because of its funny meaning and alliteration – which has also appeared in print, is Hottentottensoldatententententoonstellingsbouwterrein ("construction ground for the Hottentot soldiers' tents exhibition"); counting 53 letters.

=== English ===
The 45-letter word pneumonoultramicroscopicsilicovolcanoconiosis is the longest English word that appears in a major dictionary. Originally coined to become a candidate for the longest word in English, the term eventually developed some independent use in medicine. It is referred to as "P45" by researchers.

The 30-letter word pseudopseudohypoparathyroidism refers to an inherited disorder, named for its similarity to pseudohypoparathyroidism in presentation, which is in turn named for its similarity to hypoparathyroidism. This is the longest word that was not contrived with the sole intention of becoming the longest word.

Floccinaucinihilipilification, at 29 letters and meaning the act of estimating something as being worth so little as to be practically valueless, or the habit of doing so, is the longest non-technical, coined word in Oxford Dictionaries of the English language.

Antidisestablishmentarianism, at 28 letters, is the longest non-coined, non-systematic English word in Oxford Dictionaries. It refers to a 19th-century political movement that opposed the disestablishment of the Church of England as the state church of England.

=== Fijian ===
A man by the name of Levani Mavoa from the village of Vadravadra on Gau Island is reported to have the longest name in Fiji and possibly the world. His full surname is Mavoaiuluivitimaitaveunienanodralakicakacakatakanavalenilotunagonenivadravadraenaesitetimaiuraqaicuruvularuaenavaleniveivakabulaimaiwaiyevoenayasanakocakaudrove, which is 160 letters long. His surname translates to "injured while on Taveuni when the people of Vadravadra went to work at Ura Estate where he got injured and was later admitted for two months at the Waiyevo Hospital in the province of Cakaudrove".

=== French ===
The longest word, hippopotomonstrosesquippedaliophobie (36 letters) is the fear (or phobia) of long words. The word is formed from the Latin word sesquipedalia (singular sesquipedalis), which the Ancient Roman poet Horace used in Ars Poetica to describe excessively long words; literally, it means "a foot-and-a-half long".

Like the other phobias in the list, hippopotomonstrosesquippedaliophobie can be pluralised by adding the letter s to the end. The adjective interdépartemental (18 letters), which also appears in the list, can be made longer by appending the letters es, which gives its plural, grammatically gendered form.

=== German ===
In German, whole numbers (smaller than 1 million) can be expressed as single words, which makes siebenhundertsiebenundsiebzigtausendsiebenhundertsiebenundsiebzig (777,777) a 65 letter word. In combination with -malig or, as an inflected noun, (des …) -maligen, all numbers can be written as one word. A 79 letter word, Donaudampfschiffahrtselektrizitätenhauptbetriebswerkbauunterbeamtengesellschaft, was named the longest published word in the German language by the 1972 Guinness Book of World Records, but longer words are possible. The word was the name of a prewar Viennese club for subordinate officials of the headquarters of the electrical division of the company named the Donaudampfschiffahrtsgesellschaft, "Danube steam boat operation company".

The longest word that is not created artificially as a longest-word record seems to be Rindfleischetikettierungsüberwachungsaufgabenübertragungsgesetz at 63 letters. The word means "law delegating beef label monitoring" but as of 2013, it was removed from the books because European Union regulations have changed and that particular law became obsolete, leading to news reports that Germany "had lost its longest word".

In December 2016 the 51-letter word Bundespräsidentenstichwahlwiederholungsverschiebung ("deferral of the second iteration of the federal presidential run-off election") was elected the Austrian Word of the Year 2016. The jury called it a "descriptive word" which "in terms of its content as well as its length, is a symbol and an ironic form of commentary for the political events of this year, characterized by the very long campaign for the presidential election, the challenges of the voting process, and its reiteration."

The tongue twister Rhabarberbarbarabarbarbarenbartbarbierbier gave rise to the novelty song Barbara's Rhubarb Bar (Barbaras Rhabarberbar), which became a viral phenomenon in 2024. Another long word, coming in at 67 letters, is Grundstücksverkehrsgenehmigungszuständigkeitsübertragungsverordnung, meaning “the rule on the transfer of jurisdiction in authorizing a land plot transaction.”

The longest word in the Duden is "Aufmerksamkeitsdefizit-Hyperaktivitätsstörung" (ADHD) with 42 letters.

=== Greek ===
In his comedy Assemblywomen (c. 392 BC), Aristophanes coined the 182-letter word λοπαδοτεμαχοσελαχογαλεοκρανιολειψανοδριμυποτριμματοσιλφιοκαραβομελιτοκατακεχυμενοκιχλεπικοσσυφοφαττοπεριστεραλεκτρυονοπτοκεφαλλιοκιγκλοπελειολαγῳοσιραιοβαφητραγανοπτερύγων (Lopadotemachoselachogaleokranioleipsanodrimhypotrimmatosilphiokarabomelitokatakechymenokichlepikossyphophattoperisteralektryonoptekephalliokigklopeleiolagoiosiraiobaphetraganopterygon), a fictional food dish consisting of a combination of fish and other meat. The word is cited as the longest ancient Greek word ever written. A modern Greek word of 22 letters is ηλεκτροεγκεφαλογράφημα (ilektroenkefalográfima) (gen. ηλεκτροεγκεφαλογραφήματος (ilektroenkefalografímatos), 25 letters) meaning "electroencephalogram".

=== Hebrew ===
The longest Hebrew word is the 19-letter-long (including vowels) וכשלאנציקלופדיותינו (u'chshelentsiklopediotenu), which means "And when to our encyclopedias..." The Hebrew word אנציקלופדיה (encyclopedia) is of a European origin.

The longest word in Hebrew that doesn't originate from another language is וכשלהתמרמרויותינו, (u'chshelehitmarmeruyotenu) which crudely means "And when, to our resentments/ grievances"

The 11-letter-long (including vowels) וְהָאֲחַשְׁדַּרְפְּנִים (veha'aḥashdarpením) (Esther 9:3) is the longest word to appear in the Hebrew Bible. – Its meaning is "And the satraps". It also does not originate from Hebrew.

Other very long Hebrew words include:

- וכשבהשתעשעויותיהם (u'chshebehishta'ashuateyhem) meaning: "And when they were having fun" or "And while in their playfulness".וכשאימפריותיכן

=== Hindi ===
Hindi has a finite list of compound words which are based on established grammatical rules of the language. The word commonly cited as the longest in Hindi is लौहपथगामिनीसूचकदर्शकहरितताम्रलौहपट्टिका (lauhapathagāminīsūcakadarśakaharitatāmralauhapaṭṭikā), which consists of 24 consonants and 10 vowel diacritics, making up a total of 34 characters. The word literally means "a green railway warning signboard made of copper-iron". Its plural would be लौहपथगामिनीसूचकदर्शकहरितताम्रलौहपट्टिकाएँ (lauhapathagāminīsūcakadarśakaharitatāmralauhapaṭṭikāẽ), which has an additional vowel and a diacritic. It is a neologism and not in common use. However this word is a direct loan word or borrowing from Sanskrit rather than a Hindi word.

A much smaller word borrowed from Sanskrit which is in common use and is also often cited as the longest word is किंकर्तव्यविमूढ़ (kiṁkartavyavimūṛha). It consists of 8 consonants and 5 vowel diacritics, making up a total of 13 characters. The word literally means "confused about what to do", meaning to be bewildered or flabbergasted.

=== Icelandic ===
Icelandic has the ability to form compounds of arbitrary length by stringing together genitives (eignarfallssamsetning), so no single words of maximal length exist in the language. However, vaðlaheiðarvegavinnuverkfærageymsluskúr and vaðlaheiðarvegavinnuverkfærageymsluskúraútidyralyklakippuhringur are sometimes cited as particularly long words; the latter has 64 letters and means "a keychain ring for the outdoor key of road workers shed in a moor called Vaðlaheiði".

Analysis of a corpus of contemporary Icelandic texts by Uwe Quasthoff, Sabine Fiedler and Erla Hallsteinsdóttir identified Alþjóðaflutningaverkamannasambandsins ("of the International Transport Workers' Federation"; 37 letters) and Norðvestur-Atlantshafsfiskveiðistofnunarinnar ("of the Northwest Atlantic Fisheries' Organization"; 45 letters) as the longest unhyphenated and hyphenated words.

The longest word occurring at least twice in the University of Leipzig isl-is_web_2015 corpus is Auðmannastjórnvaldaembættisstjórnmálaverkalýðsverðlausraverðbréfaábyrgðarlausrakvóta-ræningjaaftaníossaspilling (110 letters).

=== Irish ===
The longest non-compound word in Irish is deindreacroineolaíocht, a 22-letter-long word meaning "dendrochronology".

=== Italian ===
The longest word in Italian is traditionally precipitevolissimevolmente, which is a 26-letter-long adverb. It is formed by subsequent addition of postfixes to the original root:

1. precipitevole: "hasty";
2. precipitevolissimo: "very hasty";
3. precipitevolissimevole: "[of someone/something] that acts very hastily", (not grammatically correct);
4. precipitevolissimevolmente: "in a way like someone/something that acts very hastily" (not grammatically correct, but nowadays part of the language).

The word is never used in every-day language, but in jokes. Nevertheless, it is an official part of Italian language; it was coined in 1677 by poet Francesco Moneti:

perché alla terra alfin torna repente / precipitevolissimevolmente

— Francesco Moneti, Cortona Convertita, canto III, LXV

The word technically violates Italian grammar rules, the correct form being precipitevolissimamente, which is three letters and one syllable shorter. The poet coined the new word to have 11 syllables in the second verse.

Other words can be created with a similar (and grammatically correct) mechanism starting from a longer root, winding up with a longer word. Some examples are:

- sovramagnificentissimamente (cited by Dante Alighieri in De vulgari eloquentia), 27 letters, "in a way that is more than magnificent by far" (archaic);
- incontrovertibilissimamente, 27 letters, "in a way that is very difficult to falsify";
- particolareggiatissimamente, 27 letters, "in an extremely detailed way";
- anticostituzionalissimamente, 28 letters, "in a way that strongly violates the constitution".

The longest accepted neologism is psiconeuroendocrinoimmunologia (30 letters)..

Other long words are:

- nonilfenossipolietilenossietanolo (33 letters – chemical)
- pentagonododecaedrotetraedrico (30 letters – 3D geometric figure)
- esofagodermatodigiunoplastica (29 letters – surgery)
- elettroencefalograficamente (27 letters – medical adverb: electroencephalographically)
- diclorodifeniltricloroetano (27 letters – chemical: DDT)

=== Láadan ===
Láadan is not agglutinating as there is no mechanism to combine arbitrary words into one without intermediating grammatical mechanisms (such as the relativizer § In other languages); however, there are a number of affixes that further elucidate the contextual meaning of a word. These are ignored when determining the longest words in the language. The primary reference for vocabulary is the 3rd edition of the official dictionary and grammar.

- oshetham éelenethilethu, 22 letters not counting the space, or 17 phonemes (since for example ée is a toneme of e, and th is a separate sound from *t or *h separately—the asterisks indicate that neither sound exists in Láadan) – a set phrase for a wreath of grapevine, a common symbol of the language
- shineshidethóo, 14 letters or 10 phonemes – an invited guest

=== Latin ===
The longest attested word in Classical Latin is subductisupercilicarptor, which was coined by the obscure poet Laevius in the 1st century. In Medieval Latin, the longest known word is honorificabilitudinitas, which was first attested in a treatise written by the 8th century Grammarian Peter of Pisa. One can further increase the length of the words by using their dative plural form, which would result in the words subductisupercilicarptoribus and honorificabilitudinitatibus respectively; the latter word is quoted by Shakespeare in Love's Labour's Lost.

=== Lithuanian ===
The longest Lithuanian word is 40 letters long:

- nebeprisikiškiakopūstlapiaujančiuosiuose – "in those, of masculine gender, who aren't gathering enough wood sorrel's leaves by themselves anymore." – the plural locative case of past iterative active participle of verb kiškiakopūstlapiauti meaning "to pick wood-sorrels' leaves" (leaves of edible forest plant with sour taste, word by word translation "rabbit cabbage"). The word is attributed to software developer / writer Andrius Stašauskas.

=== Māori ===
The Māori-language 85-letter place name Taumatawhakatangihangakoauauotamateaturipukakapikimaungahoronukupokaiwhenuakitanatahu is the longest place name in English-speaking countries and second longest in the world, according to Wises New Zealand Guide and The New Zealand Herald.

=== Polish ===
Very long Polish words can be created as adjectives from numerals and nouns. For example, Dziewięćsetdziewięćdziesięciodziewięcionarodowościowego, 54 letters, is the genitive singular form of an adjective meaning roughly "of nine-hundred and ninety-nine nationalities". Similar words are rather artificial compounds, constructed within allowed grammar rules, but are seldom used in spoken language, although they are not nonsense words. It is possible to make even longer words in this way, for example:

Dziewięćsetdziewięćdziesiątdziewięćmiliardówdziewięćsetdziewięćdziesiątdziewięćmilionów-dziewięćsetdziewięćdziesiątdziewięćtysięcydziewięćsetdziewięćdziesięciodziewięcioletniego (176 letters, meaning "of 999,999,999,999 years old").

One of the longest common words is 31-letter dziewięćdziesięciokilkuletniemu – the dative singular form of "ninety-and-some years old one". Another known long word is konstantynopolitańczykowianeczka (32 letters), "a daughter of a man who lives in Constantinople" and pięćdziesięciogroszówka (23 letters), "a 50 groszy coin".

=== Portuguese ===
One very specific non-common use long word is "pneumoultramicroscopicossilicovulcanoconiótico" (46 letters) One of the longest common use word in portuguese is "inconstitucionalissimamente" (23 letters), frequently used when some act violates radically the constitution. Other long common use word is "indisponibilização" (18 letters). Another long-common use word is "indisponibilidade" (17 letters), used to say someone is not available for something, like a conversation. Another long common use word is "intelectualíssimo" (17 letters), other long word is intelectualidade (16 letters)

=== Romanian ===
The longest Romanian word is pneumonoultramicroscopicsilicovolcaniconioză, with 44 letters, (meaning "pneumonultramicroscopicsilicovolcanoconiosis") but the longest one admitted by the Dicționarul explicativ al limbii române ("Explanatory Dictionary of the Romanian Language", DEX) is electroglotospectrografie, with 25 letters.

=== Russian ===
Most likely one of the longest published Russian words is a technical term, тетрагидропиранилциклопентилтетрагидропиридопиридиновые (tetragidropiranilciklopentiltetragidropiridopiridinovye), which contains 55 letters. It was used in Russian patent RU2285004C2 (granted and published in 2006). This word is plural adjectival form of the systematic name of the chemical compound tetrahydropyranylcyclopentyltetrahydropyridopyridine.

Another one is превысокомногорассмотрительствующий (prevysokomnogorassmotritel'stvuyushchiy), which contains 35 letters. It is an adjective in the bureaucratic language of the 19th century "meaning a very polite form of addressing clerks, something like Your Excellency, Your Highness, Your Majesty all together" (Guinness World Records 2003). Its dative singular form, превысокомногорассмотрительствующему (prevysokomnogorassmotritel'stvuyushchemu, with 36 letters) can be an example of excessively official vocabulary of the 19th century.

Numeral compounds can be long as well, such as Тысячевосьмисотвосьмидесятидевятимикрометровый (Tysyachevos'misotvos'midesyatidevyatimikrometrovyy), which is an adjective containing 46 letters, meaning "1889-micrometers long".

=== Sanskrit ===
Sanskrit allows word compounding of arbitrary length. Nouns and verbs can be expressed in a sentence.

The longest sentence ever used in Sanskrit literature is (in Devanagari):

निरन्तरान्धकारितदिगन्तरकन्दलदमन्दसुधारसबिन्दुसान्द्रतरघनाघनवृन्द-सन्देहकरस्यन्दमानमकरन्दबिन्दुबन्धुरतरमाकन्दतरुकुलतल्पकल्पमृ-दुळसिकताजालजटिलमूलतलमरुवकमिलदलघुलघुलयकलितरमणीय-पानीयशालिकाबालिकाकरारविन्दगलन्तिकागलदेलालवङ्गपाटलघनसा-रकस्तूरिकातिसौरभमेदुरलघुतरमधुरशीतलतरसलिलधारानिराकरिष्णुत-दीयविमलविलोचनमयूखरेखापसारितपिपासायासपथिकलोकान्

In IAST transliteration:

nirantarāndhakārita-digantara-kandaladamanda-sudhārasa-bindu-sāndratara-ghanāghana-vṛnda-sandehakara-syandamāna-makaranda-bindu-bandhuratara-mākanda-taru-kula-talpa-kalpa-mṛdul̥a-sikatā-jāla-jaṭila-mūla-tala-maruvaka-miladalaghu-laghu-laya-kalita-ramaṇīya-pānīya-śālikā-bālikā-karāra-vinda-galantikā-galadelā-lavaṅga-pāṭala-ghanasāra-kastūrikātisaurabha-medura-laghutara-madhura-śītalatara-saliladhārā-nirākariṣṇu-tadīya-vimala-vilocana-mayūkha-rekhāpasārita-pipāsāyāsa-pathika-lokān

from the Varadāmbikā Pariṇaya Campū by Tirumalāmbā, composed of 195 Sanskrit letters (428 letters in the roman transliteration, dashes excluded), thus making it the longest word ever to appear in worldwide literature.

Each hyphen separates every individual word this word is composed of.

The approximate meaning of this word is:

"In it, the distress, caused by thirst, to travellers, was alleviated by clusters of rays of the bright eyes of the girls; the rays that were shaming the currents of light, sweet and cold water charged with the strong fragrance of cardamom, clove, saffron, camphor and musk and flowing out of the pitchers (held in) the lotus-like hands of maidens (seated in) the beautiful water-sheds, made of the thick roots of vetiver mixed with marjoram, (and built near) the foot, covered with heaps of couch-like soft sand, of the clusters of newly sprouting mango trees, which constantly darkened the intermediate space of the quarters, and which looked all the more charming on account of the trickling drops of the floral juice, which thus caused the delusion of a row of thick rainy clouds, densely filled with abundant nectar."

=== Slovak ===
Traditionally, the word najneobhospodarovávateľnejšieho ("of the least cultivable", 31 letters) is considered as the longest Slovak word, but there are some longer artificial words. Most of them are compound adjectives in dative, instrumental or other grammatical case and derived from the iterative or frequentative verbal form or the ability adjective form (like -able).

Artificial words, lexically valid but never used in language:

- znajneprekryštalizovávateľnejšievajúcimi, 40 letters, "through the least crystallised ones"
- znajnepreinternacionalizovateľnejšievať, 39 letters
- najnezrevolucionalizovateľnejšiemu, 34 letters
- najnerozkrasokorčuľovateľnejšieho, 33 letters

Artificial words using Slovak towns or places, lexically valid but never used in language:

- znajneprehornádskodružstevnianskovávateľnejšievajúcimi, 54 letters
- znajneprechminianskojakubovianskovávateľnejšievajúcimi, 54 letters

Numerals:

- deväťstodeväťdesiatdeväťtisícštyristodeväťdesiatdeväť, 53 letters, "999499"
- sedemstodeväťdesiatsedemtisícsedemstodeväťdesiatsedem, 53 letters, "797797"

=== Spanish ===
The longest word in Spanish is esternocleidomastoideitis (inflammation of the sternocleidomastoid muscle, 30 letters). Runners-up are anticonstitucionalmente ([proceeding in a manner that is] contrary to the constitution (anticonstitutionally)) and electroencefalografistas (specialists that do electrical scans on brains (electroencephalographists)), both 23 letters.

The word anticonstitucionalmente is usually considered the longest word in general use. This word can be made even longer by the addition of the absolute superlative suffix, rendering anticonstitucionalísimamente (i.e.: "very strongly against the constitution"). Some dictionaries (but not the RAE dictionary) removed its root word (anticonstitucional) in 2005, causing comments about it not "being a valid word anymore" and suggesting the use of inconstitucional as a replacement.

=== Swedish ===
Realisationsvinstbeskattning (28 letters) is the longest word in Svenska Akademiens Ordlista. It means "capital gains taxation", and is usually shortened to Reavinstskatt (same meaning). However, Swedish grammar makes it possible to create arbitrarily long words. One such word is Spårvagnsaktiebolagsskensmutsskjutarefackföreningspersonalbeklädnadsmagasinsförrådsförvaltarens (94 letters) which means: "[belonging to] The manager of the depot for the supply of uniforms to the personnel of the track cleaners' union of the tramway company".

=== Toki Pona ===
kijetesantakalu in the Toki Pona writing system Sitelen Pona

The longest word in Toki Pona is kijetesantakalu (15 letters), which was proposed in 2009 as an April Fools' joke by the language's creator Sonja Lang as a word for any animal of the Procyonidae family, which includes raccoons and related species. The word has since entered into common use, and it has become common to define kijetesantakalu more broadly as any animal from the Musteloidea superfamily. In 2019 James Flear designed a glyph for kijetesantakalu in Toki Pona's Sitelen Pona writing system, which has become a popular icon within the Toki Pona community.

As a minimalistic isolating constructed language, most words in Toki Pona are much shorter, the median being 4 letters. The longest words featured in the 2014 book Toki Pona: The Language of Good, Lang's first official Toki Pona publication, are the 7-letter words kepeken ("to use, by means of") and sitelen ("symbol, picture"). The list of proposed country names in the same book also mentions ma Papuwanijukini ("Papua New Guinea"), which includes a 14-letter proper adjective.

=== Vietnamese ===
Vietnamese is an isolating language, which naturally limits the length of a morpheme. The longest, at seven letters, is nghiêng, which means "inclined" or "to lean". This is the longest word that can be written without a space. However, not all words in Vietnamese are single morphemes. Indeed, nghiêng can be reduplicated as nghiêng nghiêng.

The written language abounds with compound words in which each constituent word is delimited by spaces, just like any freestanding word. Moreover, the grammar lacks inflection to mark parts of speech, and prepositions are often optional. Therefore, the boundary between a word and a phrase is poorly defined. Examples of this ambiguity include:

- Chủ nghĩa phân biệt chủng tộc ("racism"), which is composed of the words chủ nghĩa ("ideology"), phân biệt ("discriminate"), and chủng tộc ("race")
- Cơm gà xào sả ớt, which literally describes a dish of grilled chicken sauteed with lemongrass and peppers on rice
- Ông bà anh chị em, a polite pronoun composed of five kinship terms
- Trường Trung học cơ sở và Trung học phổ thông Long Khánh, which literally describe a school name

Unlike locally coined compound words, compound words in Sino-Vietnamese vocabulary are less ambiguous, because of the use of premodifiers (as in English) as opposed to the native postmodifiers. Long Sino-Vietnamese words include bách khoa toàn thư ("encyclopedia") and thủy động lực học ("hydrodynamics").

Loanwords and pronunciation respellings from other languages can also result in long words. For example, "consortium" is côngxoocxiom (12 letters), and "Indonesia" may be left as-is or spelled In-đô-nê-xi-a (13 counting hyphens). The Encyclopedic Dictionary of Vietnam systematically respells foreign names, introducing long names into an official Vietnamese lexicon:

- Kômixacjepxkaia ("Komissarzhevskaya", 15 letters)
- Rôjơđextơvenxki ("Rozhdestvensky", 15 letters)
- Mêtơrôpôliten Ôpêra ("Metropolitan Opera", 18 letters)

Long initialisms in Vietnamese include:

- CHXHCNVN (Cộng hòa Xã hội chủ nghĩa Việt Nam, "Socialist Republic of Vietnam", 8 characters)
- MTDTGPMNVN (Mặt trận Dân tộc Giải phóng miền Nam Việt Nam, "Viet Cong", 10 characters)

In modern Vietnamese, compound words can be identified fairly easily within title cased text: a morpheme that begins with a capital letter followed by one or more morphemes that begin with a lowercase letter. For example, xã hội chủ nghĩa ("socialism") is capitalized as one component within Cộng hòa Xã hội chủ nghĩa Việt Nam.

=== Welsh ===
Llanfairpwllgwyngyllgogerychwyrndrobwllllantysiliogogogoch, a railway station on the island of Anglesey in Wales, is the longest place name in the Welsh language. At 51 letters in the Welsh alphabet (the digraphs ll and ch are each collated as single letters) the name can be translated as "St Mary's church in the hollow of the white hazel near to the rapid whirlpool and the church of St Tysilio of the red cave". However, it was artificially contrived in the 1860s as a publicity stunt, to give the station the longest name of any railway station in the United Kingdom.

Long words are comparatively rare in Welsh. Candidates for long words other than proper nouns include the following (the digraph dd is also treated as a single letter, as is ng in many instances including in the last word below):

- gwrthddatgysylltiadaeth (antidisestablishmentarianism)
- microgyfrifiaduron (microcomputers)
- gwrthgyfansoddiaethwyr (anticonstitutionalists)
- lled-ddargludyddion (semiconductors)
- tra-arglwyddiaethasant (they tyrannised)
- cyfrwngddarostynedigaeth (intercession) (-au can be added to form the plural, and the word can be further lengthened slightly by initial mutation: fy nghyfrwngddarostynedigaethau, "my intercessions")

== See also ==
- Category:Longest words by language
- Morphology (linguistics)
- List of long place names
  - Wikipedia:Unusual place names#Long place names
- Longest English sentence
- Coxeter group – mathematical concept whose entities are sometimes called words
- Hubert Blaine Wolfeschlegelsteinhausenbergerdorff Sr., a German-born American typesetter who held the record for the longest personal name ever used (about 666 letters)
- Musical works with long names in English:
  - But What About the Noise ..., a percussion composition by John Cage, 1985
  - When the Pawn..., an album by Fiona Apple (444 characters, 1999)
  - The Boy Bands Have Won, an album by Chumbawamba (865 characters, 2008)
- List of longest names in Taiwan
