= Gargantilla (disambiguation) =

Gargantilla may refer to:

- Gargantilla, a municipality of the province of Cáceres, Extremadura, Spain
- Gargantilla del Lozoya y Pinilla de Buitrago, a municipality of the Community of Madrid, Spain
- The Spanish word for choker or necklace.
