= Kasinimnikwanapikak Lake =

Lake in Manitoba, Canada

Kasinowanapikak lake
- Location within Manitoba Location within Canada
- Location: Division No. 22 of Manitoba, Canada
- Coordinates: 54.050833°N 93.554167°W
- Frozen: December to late April

Kasinowanapikak lake is a lake in Division No. 22 of Manitoba, Canada, near Red Sucker Lake. It was named on July 6, 1978.

== Geography ==
The lake's size is 1,400 metres (4,600 ft) and has no islands.

Kasinowanapikak Lake is connected to Opimekoskonewinik Lake via Opimekoskonewinik Creek. Other nearby lakes include Okas Lake, Pekwachnamaykoskwaskwaypinwanik Lake, and Red Sucker Lake.

== See also ==
- List of long place names
- List of lakes of Manitoba
