= Tweebuffelsmeteenskootmorsdoodgeskietfontein =

Human settlement in South Africa

Coordinates: 26°10′S 26°28′E

Tweebuffelsmeteenskootmorsdoodgeskietfontein is a farm in the Ditsobotla Local Municipality of the Ngaka Modiri Molema District Municipality, some 20 kilometres (12 mi) east of the town of Lichtenburg and 200 kilometres (120 mi) west of Pretoria, in the North West province of South Africa, that is noted for its unusually long place name of 44 characters. Originally granted to A.P. de Nysschen on 24 April 1866 by the government of the South African Republic, Tweebuffelsmeteenskootmorsdoodgeskietfontein is also sometimes known by the shortenings Twee buffels (Two buffaloes) and Twee Buffels Geskiet (Two buffaloes shot).

== Name ==
The name in Afrikaans means "the spring where two buffaloes were shot stone-dead with one shot" (Afrikaans: Twee buffels met een skoot morsdood geskiet fontein). 44 characters long, it is the longest place name in South Africa and possibly fourth-longest in the world. The literal translation is:

- Twee buffels = "Two buffaloes"
- met een skoot = "with one shot"
- morsdood = "stone dead"
- geskiet = "shot"
- fontein = "spring (river source)" or "fountain".

For brevity, it is sometimes known by the shortenings Twee buffels (Two buffaloes) and Twee Buffels Geskiet (Two buffaloes shot).

The name follows a common format for Afrikaans-language place names in South Africa, and illustrates the compounding nature of Germanic languages including Afrikaans, itself derived from Dutch. All the descriptive terms relating to one concept can generally be tied together into one long word. Another example of this would be onderwysleierskapontwikkelingsprojek, which means "education leadership development project." Such use is, however, not common, and such words are often separated using one or more hyphens if they become too long or unwieldy.

== Farm ==
The farm consists of a farmhouse and ranch, and is located in the Ditsobotla Local Municipality of the Ngaka Modiri Molema District Municipality, North West province of South Africa some 20 kilometres (12 mi) east of the town of Lichtenburg and 200 kilometres (120 mi) west of Pretoria.

== History ==
The farm was originally granted to A.P. de Nysschen on 24 April 1866 by the government of the South African Republic. It is referred to in a 1914 survey diagram as "Twee Buffels Geschiet" (Two buffaloes shot) and shown as having an area of 6,119 morgen and 429 square roods (5241.7 hectares). Records from British concentration camps during the Second Boer War records five residents of Tweebuffelsmeteenskootmorsdoodgeskietfontein in 1901. In 1985, Tweebuffelsmeteenskootmorsdoodgeskietfontein was the subject of an Afrikaans-language song written by Fanus Rautenbach and performed by Anton Goosen. Rautenbach had originally written the song in 1978, and it tells of the supposed hunter Gysie Grootlief who volunteers to shoot a giant buffalo with twelve-foot wide horns terrorising the hamlet of Sannaspos.

== See also ==
- Afrikaans grammar
- Longest word in Afrikaans
