= Verkhnenovokutlumbetyevo =

Verkhnenovokutlumbetevo Верхненовокутлумбетьево
- Selo
- Location within Orenburg Oblast Location within Russia
- Coordinates: 53°14′53″N 53°45′53″E
- Country: Russia
- Region: Orenburg Oblast
- District: Matveyevsky District

Population (2010)
  - Total: 257
- Time zone: UTC+3:00

Verkhnenovokutlumbetyevo (Russian: Верхненовокутлумбетьево) is a rural locality (village) in Matveyevsky District of Orenburg Oblast, Russia, with a population: 257 (2010 census); .

Verkhnenovokutlumbetevo has the longest fused (without spaces and hyphens) name of any settlement in Russia along with the village Starokozmodemyanovskoye in the Tambov Region (23 letters).
