= Mamungkukumpurangkuntjunya Hill =

Hill in South Australia

Coordinates: 27°07′32″S 132°32′32″E

Location in South Australia

Mamungkukumpurangkuntjunya Hill (or Mamungkukumpurangkuntjunya) is a hill in the Australian state of South Australia located in the Anangu Pitjantjatjara Yankunytjatjara lands about 110 kilometres (68 mi) west of the town of Marla and about 21 kilometres (13 mi) south-west of the settlement of Mimili.

The name means "where the devil urinates" in the regional Pitjantjatjara language and was recorded during a field trip organised by an unspecified state government agency in May 1989. It was gazetted on 4 November 2010 by the Government of South Australia as "Mamungkukumpurangkuntjunya" without the word "hill". The name is the longest official place name in Australia.

== See also ==
- List of long place names
- List of unusual place names
