= Nunathloogagamiutbingoi Dunes =

Beach on Nunivak Island, Alaska

Coordinates: 59°51′08″N 166°03′11″W

Nunathloogagamiutbingoi Dunes is the name of a beach on the southeastern coast of Nunivak Island in Bethel Census Area, Alaska.

Summer temperatures in the area are frequently 50 to 59 °F (10 to 15 °C), and the night is commonly 40 to 49 °F (4 to 9 °C). The wintertime brings highs down to 10 to 19 °F (−12 to −7 °C) and overnight lows of −19 to −10 °F (−28 to −23 °C). There is little precipitation; the month of August is the wettest, while March is frequently the driest month.

Nunathloogagamiutbingoi has been noted for its long place name. Nunathloogagamiutbingoi Dunes was declared "most difficult to pronounce" in the state of Alaska by Reader's Digest.
