= Tautogram =

Text in which all words start with the same letter

A tautogram (Greek: tauto gramma, "same letter") is a text in which all words start with the same letter.

Historically, tautograms were mostly poetical forms. The difference between a tautogram and alliteration is that tautograms are a written, visual phenomenon, whereas alliterations are a phonetic one. Most cases of alliteration are also tautograms, though certainly not all since different letters can frequently take on the same sound (e.g., circle segment or Catcher Ken). Similarly, most tautograms are also alliterations, although exceptions exist when using letters with multiple pronunciations (e.g., crazy child or pneumatic plate).

== In English ==
- Truly they triumph, trumpeting trills to trounce the terrible travesties.
- I inflame inactive ire instantly into infuriating internal infernos, igniting intense incendiary intent.
- An Accommodating Advertisement and an Awkward Accident, the 427-word winning entry in Tit-Bits Magazine's Christmas 1884 competition for "the longest sensible sentence, every word of which begins with the same letter".
- The interactive fiction game Ad Verbum, contains a series of rooms which are described and interacted with, in tautograms.

== In other languages ==
=== Armenian ===
An example of a tautogram in Armenian is a poem by Vanetsi with all words starting with "Z":

Զինված զինվորի՝ Զոհն էր զինվորը զինված

And another using the letter "Sh":

Շախմատամրցումը շահած

Շուշանագույն շքեղ

Շիֆոնե շրջազգեստով

Շառագույն շրթնաներկոտ շրթունքներով

Շշիկահեր շնորհալի Շենավանցի

Շքեղիրա՛ն շախմատիստուհի

Շողիկ Շաքարյանը

Շատ-շատ շնորհակալ

Շփոթվաց ու շոյված էր

Շրջապատող շատամարդ

Շնորհքով շախմատասերների

Շռայլ շնորհավորանքներից...

=== Bengali ===
Notable Bengali books of tautogram features include 'Keshta Kabir Kashtagulo', 'Keshta Kabir Conference' and 'Keshta Kabi' written by Iqbal Sardar Nazmul Kabir. Out of these three, a total of 7,000 words have been used in the first, 10,000 words in the second and about 10,000 words in the third and each word begins with the same letter. This is the single and larger effort of tautogram in Bengali literature.

An example of a tautogram in Bengali is a story with all words starting with "K" (ক):

কাকা কবিরকে কহিলেন কষ্ট করে কাজটি কর। কাজটি কিন্তু কঠিন। কাকার কথায় কবির কাজটি করিল। কিন্তু কবির কাজটি করে কাদঁছিল। কবিরের কান্নায় কাকা কিংকর্তব্যবিমূঢ়। কিছুক্ষণ কেদেঁ কবির কাকাকে কহিল কোমর ও কাধেঁর কষ্টের কথা। কেন কাকা কবিরকে কাগজ কাটার কঠিন ও কষ্টকর কাজটি করতে কহেছিলেন? কাগজ কাটাই কবিরের কোমর ও কাধেঁর কষ্টের কারণ। কাকা কখন কোথায় কী করেন কহা কষ্টকর।

কবির কুমিল্লার কান্দিরপাড়ে কাগজের কোম্পানিতে কাজ করে। কবিরের কাকা কোম্পানির কমিউনিকেশন কর্মকর্তা। কাকা কবিরকে কর্মবীর কহিলেন। কারণ কবির কাজে কখনো ক্লান্তিবোধ করেনা। কবিরের কলিগ কেশব কুমার কর্মকার কোম্পানিতে ক্লার্কের কাজ করেন। কনিকা কুমারী কোম্পানীর কনিষ্ঠা কর্মচারী। কাকার কঠোর কমান্ডে কাজ করতে কবির-কেশব-কনিকা কখনোই কুন্ঠাবোধ করেননা। কিন্তু কাকা-কনিকার কিছু কর্মকাণ্ডে কবির-কেশব কখনোই কাকাকে কুর্ণিশ করেনা।

কিন্তু কাকি কাকাকে কিছু কহিলে কাকা কাকিকে কঠিন কঠিন কথা কহেন। কোন কারণে কাকি কোম্পানির কথা কিংবা কোম্পানির কনিষ্ঠা কর্মচারী কনিকার কথা কিছু কহিলে কাকা কর্কশ কন্ঠে কাকিকে কিছু কুকথা কহেন। কাকার কর্মকাণ্ডে কখনো কখনো কাকি কান্নাকাটি করেন। কাকি কাকাকে কিছু কষ্টের কথা কহিতেন। কিন্তু কহিবেন কিভাবে? কাকা কখন কটায় কোথায় কি কাজ করেন কহা কষ্টকর। কাকির কথা, কোম্পানিতে কাজের কাজ কিছুইনা। কোম্পানির কিছু কর্মকান্ড কাকির কষ্টের কারণ।

=== French ===
An example of a tautogram in French is Chapitre cent-cinquante-cinq (copie certifiée conforme), a short story by Georges Perec:

Ça commença comme ça : certaines calomnies circulaient concernant cinq conseillers civils coloniaux : contrats commerciaux complaisamment conclus, collaborateurs congédiés, comptabilités complexes camouflant certains corruptions crapuleuses, chantages comminatoires, concussions classiques... Croyant combattre ces charges confuses, cinquante commissaires-chefs comiquement conformes (cheveux châtain clair coupés courts, costume croisé, chemise couleur chair, cravate café crème, chaussures cloutées convenablement cirées) contactèrent certain colonel congolais causant couramment cubain. « Cherchez chez Célestin, Cinq Cours Clémenceau », chuchota ce centenaire cacochyme constamment convalescent, « car ce célèbre café-concert contrôle clandestinement ces combines criminelles. » Cinq commissaires chevronnés coururent courageusement Cours Clémenceau. Cependant, coïncidence curieuse, cinq catcheurs corpulents, cachés chez Célestins, complotaient contre cette civilisation capitaliste complètement corrompue. Ces citoyens comptaient canarder certain chef couronné considéré comme coupable. Commissaires certifiés contre champions casse-cou : choc colossal ! Ça castagna copieusement. Conclusion : cinquante clients contusionnés, cinq cardiaques commotionnés, cinq cadavres ! Ce chassé-croisé cauchemardesque chagrina chacun.

=== Greek ===
ΤΥΦΛΟΣ ΤΑ Τ`ΩΤΑ ΤΟΝ ΤΕ ΝΟΥΝ ΤΑ Τ`ΑΜΜΑΤ`ΕΙ – Your ears and your mind are blind as your eyes. Sophocles, Oedipus st:370

=== Italian ===
Aristotele, ancora adolescente, aveva avuto accesso all’associazione accademica.

Appena apprese abbastanza, abbandonò Atene andando ad abitare ad Atarneo.

Adulto, avviò alcuni allievi all’astronomia, all’aritmetica, all’anatomia, all’arte amatoria.

– Adesso argomenteremo attorno agli affetti, – affermò Aristotele avvicinandosi adagio ad Alessandro, accomodandoglisi accanto. – Ascoltami anziché addormentarti.

=== Latin ===
Veni, Vidi, Vici: a famous Latin sentence reportedly written by Julius Caesar

Pugna Porcorum: a Latin poem written by John Placentius (under the pen name "Publius Porcius").

=== Polish ===
Król Karol kupił królowej Karolinie korale koloru koralowego.

=== Russian ===
An example of a tautogram in Russian is a poem by V. Smirenskiy with all words starting with "L":

Ленивых лет легко ласканье,

Луга лиловые люблю,

Ловлю левкоев ликованье,

Легенды ломкие ловлю.

Лучистый лён любовно лепит

Лазурь ласкающих лесов.

Люблю лукавых лилий лепет,

Летящий ладан лепестков.

Another example of a tautogram in Russian is a story with all words starting with "P".

Пётр Петрович Петухов, поручик пятьдесят пятого Подольского пехотного полка, получил по почте письмо, полное приятных пожеланий. «Приезжайте, — писала прелестная Полина Павловна Перепёлкина, — поговорим, помечтаем, потанцуем, погуляем, посетим полузабытый, полузаросший пруд, порыбачим. Приезжайте, Пётр Петрович, поскорее погостить».

Петухову предложение понравилось. Прикинул: приеду. Прихватил полуистёртый полевой плащ, подумал: пригодится.

Поезд прибыл после полудня. Принял Петра Петровича почтеннейший папа Полины Павловны, Павел Пантелеймонович. «Пожалуйста, Пётр Петрович, присаживайтесь поудобнее», — проговорил папаша. Подошёл плешивенький племянник, представился: «Порфирий Платонович Поликарпов. Просим, просим».

Появилась прелестная Полина. Полные плечи прикрывал прозрачный персидский платок. Поговорили, пошутили, пригласили пообедать. Подали пельмени, плов, пикули, печёнку, паштет, пирожки, пирожное, пол-литра померанцевой. Плотно пообедали. Пётр Петрович почувствовал приятное пресыщение.

После приёма пищи, после плотного перекуса Полина Павловна пригласила Петра Петровича прогуляться по парку. Перед парком простирался полузабытый полузаросший пруд. Прокатились под парусами. После плавания по пруду пошли погулять по парку.

«Присядем», — предложила Полина Павловна. Присели. Полина Павловна придвинулась поближе. Посидели, помолчали. Прозвучал первый поцелуй. Пётр Петрович притомился, предложил полежать, подстелил полуистёртый полевой плащ, подумал: пригодился. Полежали, повалялись, повлюблялись. «Пётр Петрович – проказник, прохвост», — привычно проговорила Полина Павловна.

«Поженим, поженим!», — прошептал плешивенький племянник. «Поженим, поженим», — пробасил подошедший папаша. Пётр Петрович побледнел, пошатнулся, потом побежал прочь. Побежав, подумал: «Полина Петровна – прекрасная партия, полноте париться».

Перед Петром Петровичем промелькнула перспектива получить прекрасное поместье. Поспешил послать предложение. Полина Павловна приняла предложение, позже поженились. Приятели приходили поздравлять, приносили подарки. Передавая пакет, приговаривали: «Прекрасная пара».

=== Ukrainian ===
An example of a tautogram in Ukrainian is a poem with all words starting with "S":

Сипле, стелить сад самотній

Сірий смуток, срібний сніг.

Сумно стогне сонний струмінь,

Серце слуха скорбний сміх.

Серед саду страх сіріє.

Сад солодкий спокій снить.

Сонно сиплються сніжинки.

Струмінь стомлено сичить.

Стихли струни, стихли співи,

Срібні співи серенад,

Срібно стеляться сніжинки —

Спить самотній сад.

Another example of a tautogram in Ukrainian is a story "Перший поцілунок" with all words starting with "P":

«Популярному перемиському поету Павлові Петровичу Подільчаку прийшло поштою приємне повідомлення: «Приїздіть, Павле Петровичу, — писав поважний правитель Підгорецького повіту Полікарп Пантелеймонович Паскевич, — погостюєте, повеселитеся». Павло Петрович поспішив, прибувши першим поїздом. Підгорецький палац Паскевичів привітно прийняв приїжджого поета. Потім під'їхали поважні персони — приятелі Паскевичів… Посадили Павла Петровича поряд панночки — премилої Поліни Полікарпівни. Поговорили про політику, погоду. Павло Петрович прочитав підібрані пречудові поезії. Поліна Полікарпівна пограла прекрасні полонези Понятовського, прелюдії Пуччіні. Поспівали, пісень, потанцювали падеспан, польку. Прийшла пора — попросили пообідати. Поставили повні підноси пляшок: портвейну, плиски, пшеничної, підігрітого пуншу, пива, принесли печених поросят, приправлених перцем, півники, пахучі паляниці, печінковий паштет, пухкі пампушки під печеричною підливою, пироги, підсмажені пляцки. Потім подали пряники, персикове повидло, помаранчі, повні порцелянові полумиски полуниць, порічок. Почувши приємну повноту, Павло Петрович подумав про панночку. Поліна Полікарпівна попросила прогулятися Підгорецьким парком, помилуватися природою, послухати пташині переспіви. Пропозиція повністю підійшла прихмілілому поету. Походили, погуляли… Порослий папороттю прадавній парк подарував приємну прохолоду. Повітря п'янило принадними пахощами. Побродивши парком, пара присіла під порослим плющем платаном. Посиділи, помріяли, позітхали, пошепталися, пригорнулися. Почувсь перший поцілунок: прощай, парубоче привілля, пора поету приймакувати».

== See also ==
- Alliteration
