= Nizhnenovokutlumbetyevo =

Nizhnenovokutlumbetyevo Нижненовокутлумбетьево
- Selo
- Location within Orenburg Oblast Location within Russia
- Coordinates: 53°15′30″N 53°39′56″E
- Country: Russia
- Region: Orenburg Oblast
- District: Matveyevsky District

Population (2010)
  - Total: 108
- Time zone: UTC+5:00

Nizhnenovokutlumbetyevo (Russian: Нижненовокутлумбетьево) is a rural locality (a (village) in Matveyevsky District of Orenburg Oblast, Russia. Population: 108 (2010 census); 183 (2002 census);
