= Kremenchug-Konstantinovskoye =

Kremenchug-Konstantinovskoye Кременчуг-Константиновское Крем-Константиновкэ
- Selo
- Location within Kabardino-Balkaria Location within Russia
- Coordinates: 43°47′27″N 43°38′54″E
- Country: Russia
- Region: Kabardino-Balkaria
- District: Baksansky District

Population (2010)
  - Total: 1,603
- Time zone: UTC+3:00

Kremenchug-Konstantinovskoye (Russian: Кременчуг-Константиновское; Kabardian: Крем-Константиновкэ) is a rural locality (a selo) in the Baksansky District in the Kabardino-Balkar Republic, Russia. Population: 1,603 (2010 census); 1,674 (2002 census);

Kremenchug-Konstantinovskoye has the longest place name in Russia without spaces.

== See also ==
- List of long place names
