= Matveyevka, Matveyevsky District, Orenburg Oblast =

Rural locality in Orenburg Oblast, Russia

Coordinates: 53°30′22″N 53°28′53″E

Matveyevka (Russian: Матвеевка) is a rural locality (a selo) and the administrative center of Matveyevsky District, Orenburg Oblast, Russia. Population: 3,044 (2010 census); 3,294 (2002 census); 3,086 (1989 Soviet census).
