= San Pedro y San Pablo Tequixtepec =

- Municipality and town
- Location in Mexico
- Coordinates: 18°03′N 97°42′W
- Country: Mexico
- State: Oaxaca
- Time zone: UTC-6 (Central Standard Time)

San Pedro y San Pablo Tequixtepec is a town and municipality in Oaxaca in south-western Mexico. The municipality covers an area of km^{2}. Having the longest place name in Mexico (28 letters), it is part of the Huajuapan District in the north of the Mixteca Region.

As of 2005, the municipality had a total population of 1,878.
