= Jalan SKOMK =

Jalan Syarikat Orang-Orang Melayu Kerajaan Hilir Perak Bekerja Sama-Sama Kerana Jimat Cermat Simpanan Dan Pinjaman Wang Dengan Tanggungan Berhad
- جالن شريکت اورڠ٢ ملايو کراجاءن هيلير ڤيرق بکرجا سام٢ کران جيمت–چرمت سيمڤنن دان ڤينجمن واڠ دڠن تڠݢوڠن برحد / Jalan SKOMK / Jalan SKOMKHPKJCDPWB

Route information
- Known for: The longest abbreviation in the world

Location
- Country: Malaysia
- States: Perak
- Districts: Hilir Perak District
- Major cities: Teluk Intan

Highway system
- Highways in Malaysia; Expressways; Federal; State

Jalan Syarikat Orang-Orang Melayu Kerajaan Hilir Perak Bekerja Sama-Sama Kerana Jimat Cermat Simpanan Dan Pinjaman Wang Dengan Tanggungan Berhad, commonly known as Jalan SKOMK or formerly known as Jalan SKOMKHPKJCDPWB is a road which is located in Teluk Intan, Hilir Perak District, Perak, Malaysia. Jalan SCOMK's full abbreviation name, S.K.O.M.K.H.P.K.J.C.D.P.W.B. is recognized by Guinness World Records as the longest abbreviation in 2022 until today.

== Naming ==
Jalan SKOMK's full name translate to English is "The Company of Malay People of the Hilir Perak Government Working Together Because of Thriftiness in Savings and Loans with Limited Liability Street". This company was formed during British Malaya (Federated Malay States) back in 1923. It was inscribed into the Great Western Railway (GWR) a year after the cooperative was formed and became the origin of the road name.

== See also ==
- List of long place names
