= Longest English sentence =

Longest printed sentences in English

There have been several claims for the "longest sentence in the English language" revolving around the longest printed sentence.

Sentences can be made arbitrarily long in various ways. One method is successive iterations, such as "Someone thinks that someone thinks that someone thinks that..." while another method is combining shorter clauses. Sentences can also be extended by recursively embedding clauses one into another, such as:

"The mouse ran away."
"The mouse that the cat hit ran away."
"The mouse that the cat hit that the dog bit ran away.
"The mouse that the cat hit that the dog bit that the fly landed on ran away."
...

This also highlights the difference between linguistic performance and linguistic competence, because the language can support more variation than can reasonably be created or recorded. As a result, one linguistics textbook concludes that, in theory, "there is no longest English sentence."

== Exceptionally long sentences in print ==
- An Accommodating Advertisement and an Awkward Accident, the 427-word winning entry in Tit-Bits Magazine's Christmas 1884 competition for "the longest sensible sentence, every word of which begins with the same letter".
- Molly Bloom's soliloquy in the James Joyce novel Ulysses (1922) contains a sentence of 4,391 words.
- William Faulkner's Absalom, Absalom! (1936) contains a sentence composed of 1,288 words (in the 1951 Random House version)
- Jonathan Coe's 2000 novel The Rotters' Club has a sentence with 13,955 words. It was inspired by Bohumil Hrabal's Dancing Lessons for the Advanced in Age: a Czech language novel written in one long sentence.
- Solar Bones by Mike McCormack is written as one sentence. It won the 2016 Goldsmith's prize for experimental fiction, was longlisted for the Booker in 2017 and won the 2018 International Dublin Literary Award.
- Ducks, Newburyport by Lucy Ellmann, a finalist for the 2019 Booker Prize, runs more than a thousand pages, mostly consisting of a single sentence that is 426,100 words long
- This Book Is the Longest Sentence Ever Written and Then Published (2020), by humor writer Dave Cowen, consists of one sentence that runs for 111,111 words, and is a stream of consciousness memoir.

== See also ==
- Longest word in English
- Longest words
