= The Pig War (poem) =

1530 Latin poem by John Placentius

The Pig War (original Latin title: Pugna Porcorum) is a Latin poem written by John Placentius (Jan Leo Struyven), a Flemish Dominican friar, under the pseudonym Publius Porcius. The text was first printed in Antwerp in 1530.

The poem consists of 248 dactylic hexameters, every single word of them beginning with the letter p. As such, the poem is a tautogram. The poem is a satirical epic telling of an intergenerational conflict between the corrupt hogs (porci in Latin), who are hogging all the privileges, and the piglets (porcelli), who want in on them. Their conflict devolves into open war, and the poet uses pigs to allegorize human corruption, conflict, and revolutionary violence in a simple and transparent way.

Paraclesis pro Potore

Perlege porcorum pulcherrima proelia, Potor,
Potando poteris placidam proferre poesin.

A Summons to the Drinker
Peruse the pigs' glorious battles, my drinker!
Drinking lets you produce placid poetry.

— John Placentius, epigraph to The Pig War

== Publication and reception history ==
The Pig War started out as a satire of student life in Leuven and was initially meant for a local audience in Catholic Belgium but, soon after being published, it also achieved popularity in Germany and elsewhere.

Placentius revised and reissued his book in 1533. In the late 19th century, English literary journals periodically rediscovered The Pig War, and it is possible that, in the 20th century, George Orwell knew or knew of it when he set out to write Animal Farm, an allegorical novella with many similarities with The Pig War.

A new edition of The Pig War by Michael Fontaine appeared in 2019, published by the Paideia Institute Press and accompanied by an English translation. In 2021, Sebastian Maskell Andersen translated the poem into Danish.

In 2021, the Dutch writer Gerard Stout adapted The Pig War into a chapter of his novel Joseph: boetprediker: E.J. Potgieter opnieuw gelezen.
