= Žvaigždžiakalnis =

- Village
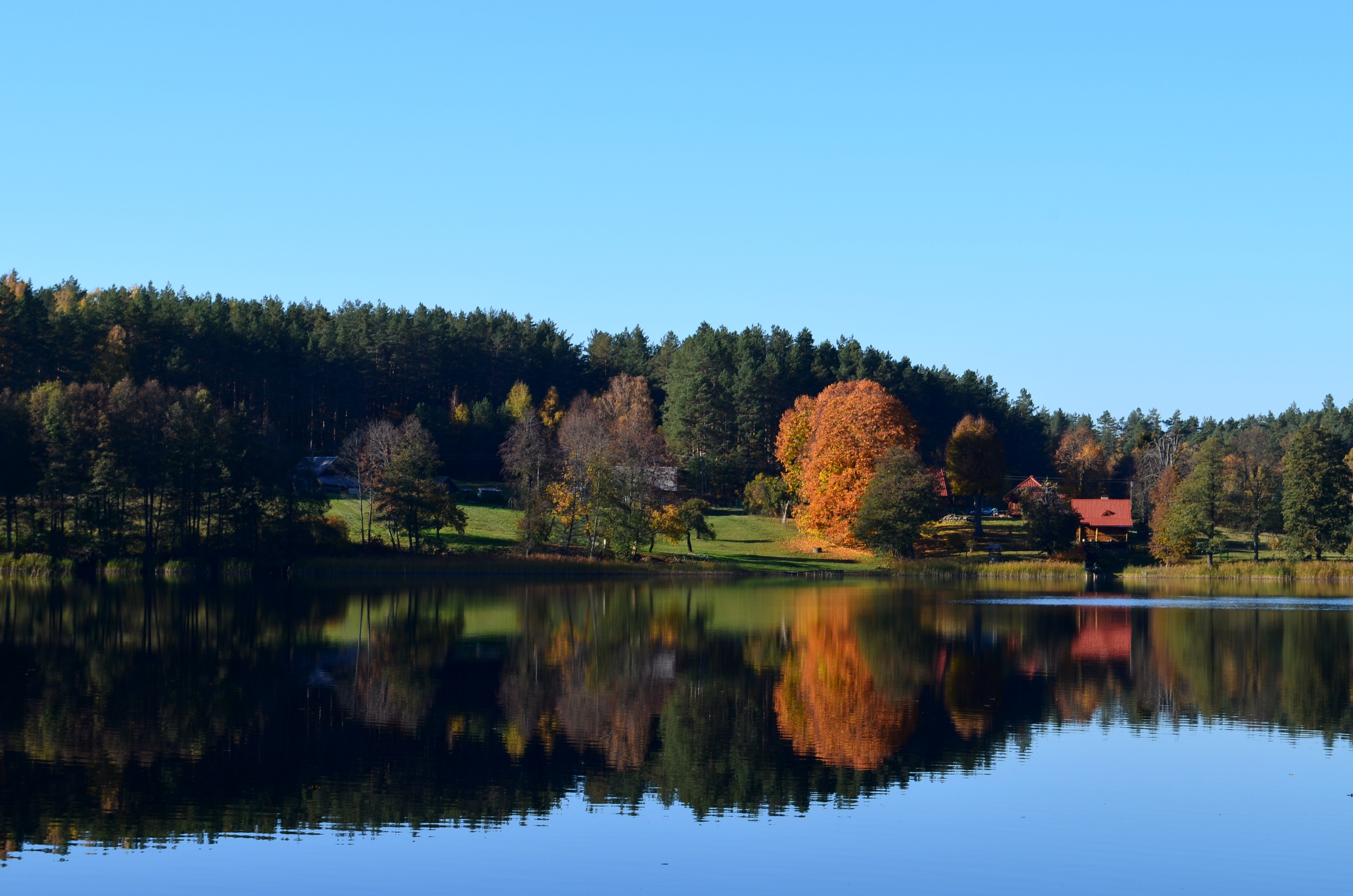

- Location in Lithuania
- Coordinates: 55°17′31″N 25°39′07″E
- Country: Lithuania
- County: Utena County
- Municipality: Molėtai district municipality
- Eldership: Čiulėnai eldership

Population (2001)
  - Total: 4
- Time zone: UTC+2 (EET)
  - Summer (DST): UTC+3 (EEST)

Žvaigždžiakalnis is a village in the Molėtai district municipality, in Utena County, eastern Lithuania. According to the 2001 census, the village has a population of 4 people. The village is located in a remote area 10 km south east from Suginčiai, in a peninsula at the western edge of the Lake Aisetas. Žvaigždžiakalnis is surrounded by forest and is part of the Labanoras Regional Park.

== Etymology ==
The name Žvaigždžiakalnis came from Lithuanian words žvaigždė and kalnas and means "a mount of stars".
