= Onkamojärvi =

Lake in Finland and Russia

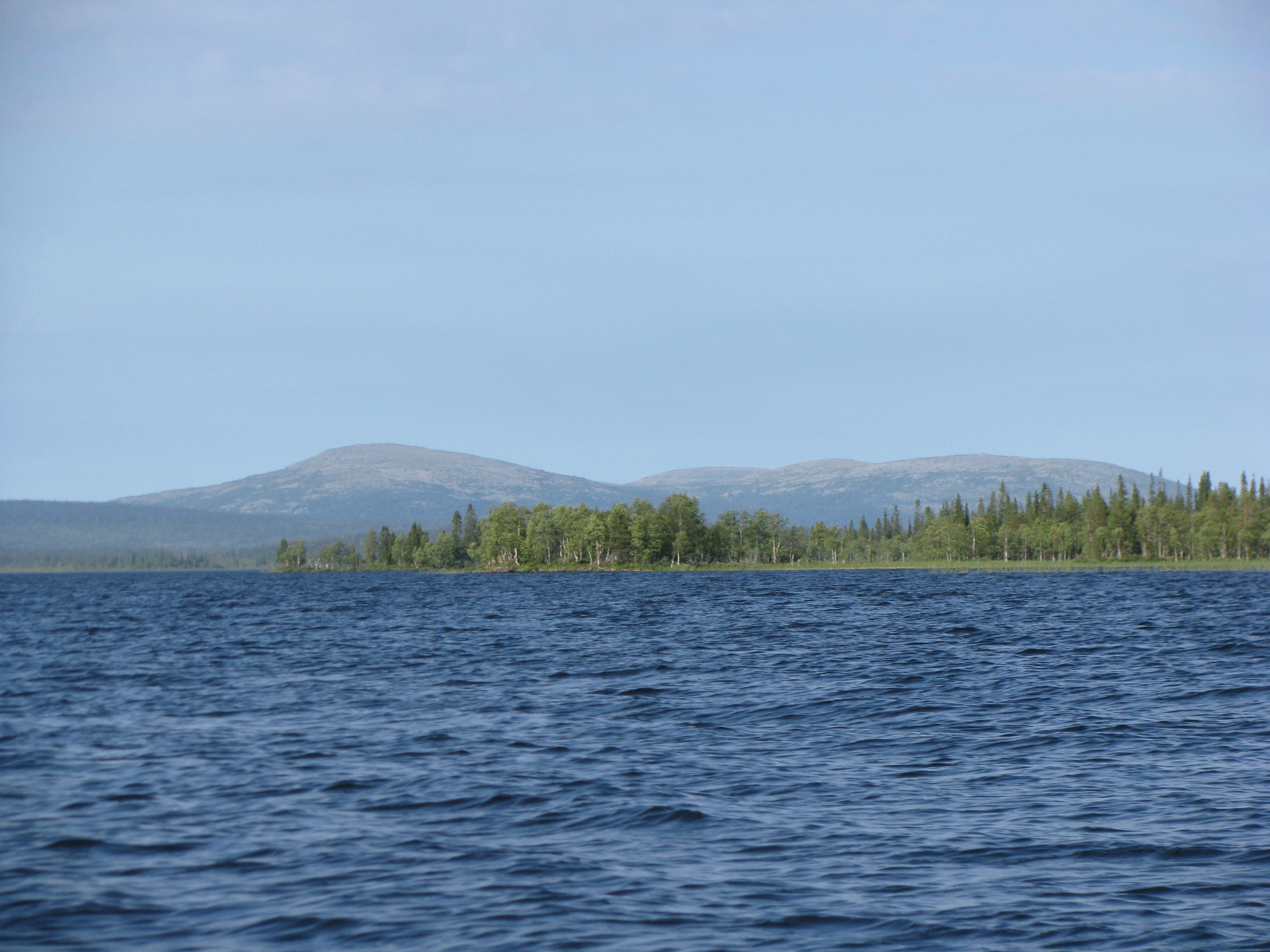
- View towards the Russian side, Mount Rohmoiva and Sallantunturi Range
- Interactive map of Onkamojärvi
- Location: Salla, Finland and Murmansk Oblast, Russia
- Coordinates: 66°45.59′N 29°3.95′E
- Surface area: 18 km^{2} (6.9 sq mi)
- Average depth: 1.85 m (6 ft 1 in)
- Shore length^{1}: ca. 35 km (22 mi)
- Surface elevation: 290.5 m (953 ft)
- ^{1} Shore length is not a well-defined measure.

Onkamojärvi (Russian: Онкамоярви, romanized: Onkamoyarvi) is a lake in Salla municipality, Lapland, Finland and Kandalakshsky District, Murmansk Oblast, Russia. It is located on the border of Finland and Russia, most of the lake being on the Finnish side of the border. The lake's surface is 290.5 metres above sea level, and its area is about 18 km^{2}. There are 32 islands in the lake, including Kallunkisaari, Karvastekemäsaari, Kätkänsuusaari, Lujesaaret, Majavasaari, Markuksen aittasaari, Nilisaari, Oravasaari, Paltsarsaari, Peurasaari, Saaranpaskantamasaari, Talvitiensuusaari, Tossonsaari and Vitsinsaari.

The name of Saaranpaskantamasaari (66°47′10.50″N 29°7′6.48″E), an uninhabited island on the Finnish side near the Russian border, translates to "island shat by Saara".
