= Pekwachnamaykoskwaskwaypinwanik Lake =

Lake in Manitoba, Canada

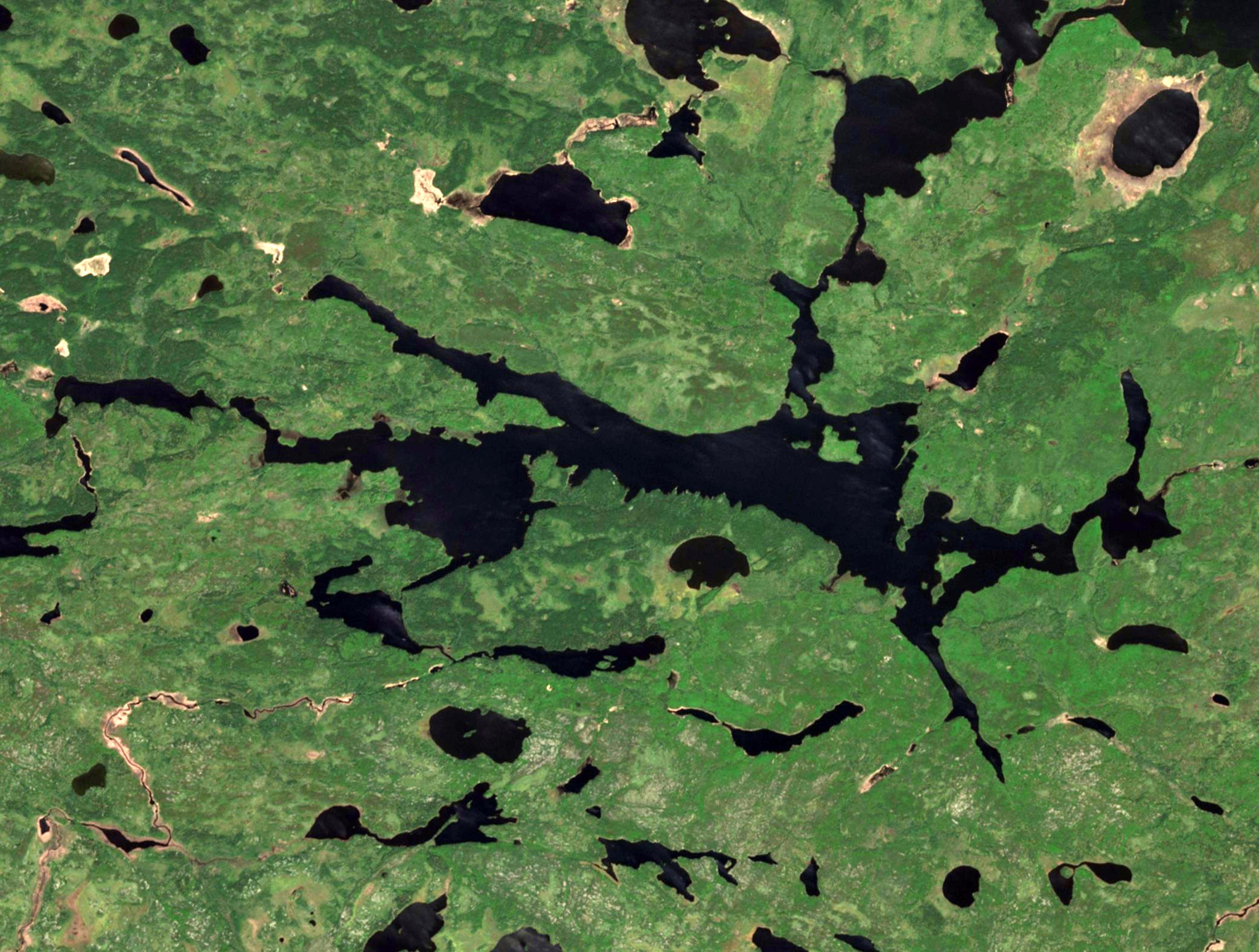
- Sentinel-2 image (2022)

- Location of the lake in Manitoba Pekwachnamaykosk waskwaypinwanik Lake (Canada)
- Coordinates: 54°1′42″N 93°32′1″W
- Max. length: 8.9 km (5.5 miles)
- Max. width: 1.6 km (0.99 miles)
- Surface elevation: 219 m (719 ft)
- Settlements: None

Pekwachnamaykoskwaskwaypinwanik Lake is a lake in the Canadian province of Manitoba. The name is Cree for "where the wild trout are caught by fishing with hooks." It is the longest place name in Canada at 31 letters long. It is just southeast of Red Sucker Lake in northeastern Manitoba, near its border with Ontario.

== See also ==
- List of lakes of Manitoba
- List of long place names
