= Bundespräsidentenstichwahlwiederholungsverschiebung =

2016 Austrian Word of the Year

Bundespräsidentenstichwahlwiederholungsverschiebung (German pronunciation: [ˈbʊndəspʁɛziˌdɛntn̩ˌʃtɪçvaːlviːdɐˌhoːlʊŋsfɛɐ̯ˌʃiːbʊŋ]) was chosen as Austria's Word of the Year 2016 by academics. Roughly translated to “Federal-President-runoff-vote-repeat-postponement”, the word gained recognition during the lengthy presidential election in 2016. The Runners-Up "Bundesheinzi", which is a combination of "Bundespräsident" (president) and the passing president Heinz Fischer's first name, and "arschknapp" ("damn" close) were also heavily influenced by Austrian politics in 2016.

== Origin ==
Notorious for its length as well as its content, Bundespräsidentenstichwahlwiederholungsverschiebung consists of 51 letters, which is remarkable even for German standards.

“In terms of its content as well as its length, [the word] is a symbol and an ironic form of commentary for the political events of this year, characterised by the lengthy campaign for the presidential election, the challenges of the voting process, and its reiteration.” – Jury of the Research Centre for Austrian German, headed by Rudolf Muhr

Due to potential manipulation during the runoff vote, the Verfassungsgerichtshof (Constitutional Court) issued an order to repeat the whole voting process. The purpose of this order was to strengthen the population's trust in the constitution and democracy. Only 30,000 votes apart after the first runoff, Alexander Van der Bellen managed to win the election against Norbert Hofer after the second runoff with a margin of 300,000 votes.

== Non-Word and Youth-Word ==
Alongside to the Word of the Year, academics of the University of Graz also named the Non-Word and the Youth-Word of the Year.

"Öxit", a compound word of "Österreich" and "exit", got voted as the Non-Word of the Year 2016. The jury dubbed the word "Unreflected analogy to Grexit and Brexit".

The Youth-Word, or rather the Youth-Sentence of the Year, is "Was ist das für 1 Life?" (What kind of life is this?). It is a widely spread expression on Austrian social media and uses aspects of "Denglish" (German mixed with English language) and lazy written language, using "1" instead of "ein".
