= Woolfardisworthy =

Woolfardisworthy or Woolsery (/ˈwʊlzri/ WUULZ-ree) is the name shared by two villages in the county of Devon, England:

- Woolfardisworthy, Mid Devon, between Tiverton and Crediton (Mid Devon)
- Woolfardisworthy, Torridge, near Clovelly and Bideford (North Devon)
