= Bolshezingereyevo =

Bolshezingereyevo Большезингереево
- Selo
- Location within Bashkortostan Location within Russia
- Coordinates: 54°02′N 53°49′E
- Country: Russia
- Region: Bashkortostan
- District: Yermekeyevsky District
- Time zone: UTC+5:00

Bolshezingereyevo (Russian: Большезингереево; Bashkir: Оло Зиңгәрәй, Olo Ziñgäräy) is a rural locality (a selo) in Nizhneulu-Yelginsky Selsoviet, Yermekeyevsky District, Bashkortostan, Russia. The population was 188 as of 2010. There are 4 streets.

== Geography ==
Bolshezingereyevo is located 12 km southeast of Yermekeyevo (the district's administrative centre) by road. Nizhneulu-Yelga is the nearest rural locality.
