= Île Kuchistiniwamiskahikan =

Island in Quebec, Canada

Coordinates: 56°19′25″N 74°22′3″W

- Interactive map of Île Kuchistiniwamiskahikan

Geography

Administration
- Canada
- Province: Quebec
- Unorganized territory: Baie-d'Hudson

Île Kuchistiniwamiskahikan is an island located in Baie-d'Hudson, Quebec. The name is Cree for "The island where boats entering the bay".

It is also known for having the longest official one-word placename in Quebec.
