= Novokonstantinovka =

Novokonstantinovka Новоконстантиновка
- Selo
- Location within Bashkortostan Location within Russia
- Coordinates: 53°47′N 55°11′E
- Country: Russia
- Region: Bashkortostan
- District: Alsheyevsky District
- Time zone: UTC+5:00

Novokonstantinovka (Russian: Новоконстантиновка; Bashkir: Яңы Константиновка, Yañı Konstantinovka) is a rural locality (a selo) in Zelenoklinovsky Selsoviet, Alsheyevsky District, Bashkortostan, Russia. The population was 99 as of 2010. There is one street.

== Geography ==
Novokonstantinovka is located 45 km southeast of Rayevsky (the district's administrative centre) by road. Tavrichanka is the nearest rural locality.
