= Azpilkueta =

Azpilkueta Spanish: Azpilcueta
- village
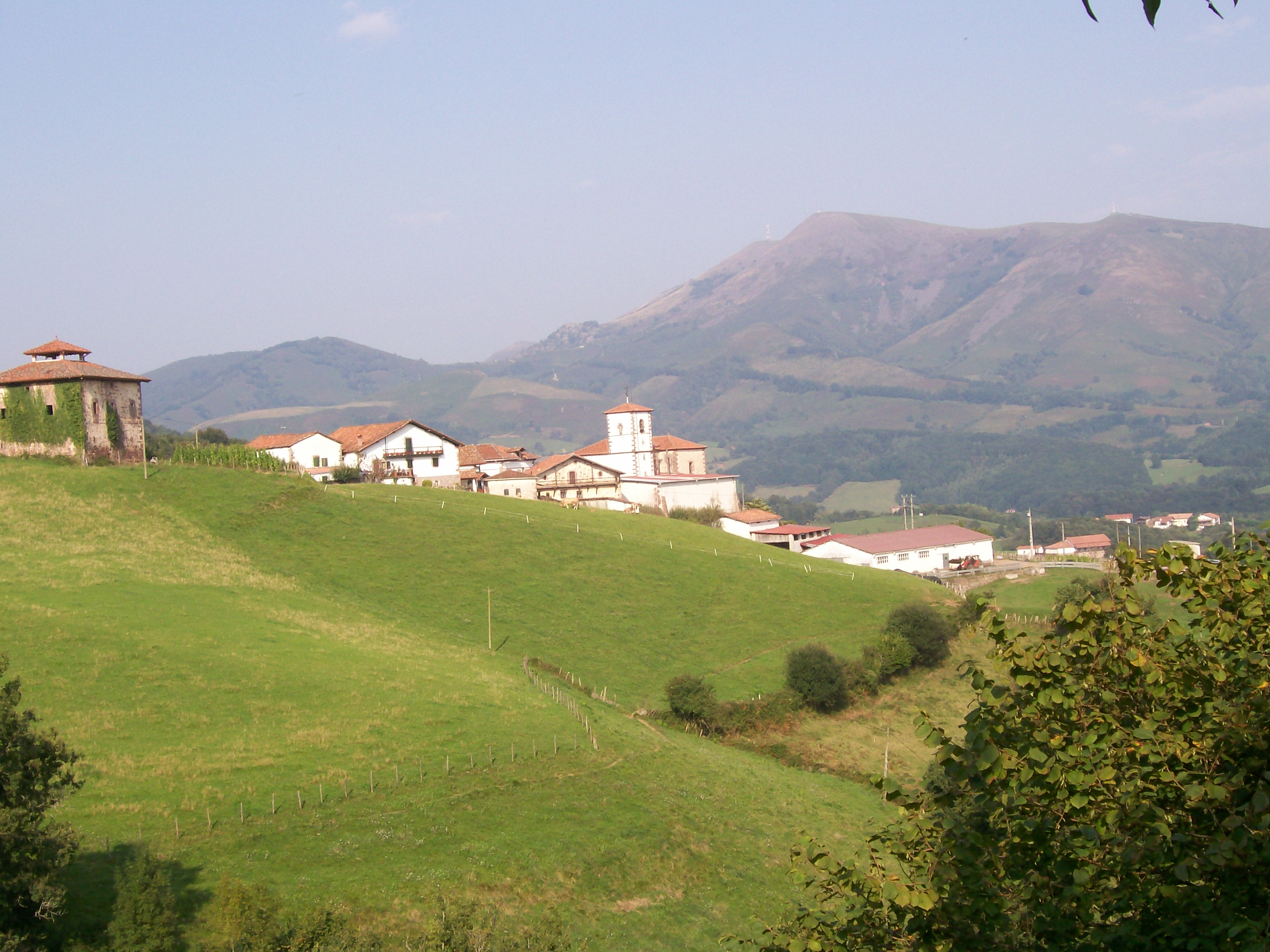

- Location in Navarre Location in Spain
- Coordinates: 43°11′06″N 1°30′24″W
- Country: Spain
- Community: Navarre
- Province: Navarre
- Special division: Baztan
- Municipality: Baztan

Population (2015)
  - Total: 188

Azpilkueta is a village located in the municipality of Baztan, Navarre, Spain.
