= Gargantilla del Lozoya y Pinilla de Buitrago =

- Municipality
- Flag Coat of arms

- Municipal location within the Community of Madrid.

- Location in Spain
- Coordinates: 40°57′56″N 3°43′1″W
- Country: Spain
- Autonomous community: Community of Madrid

Area
  - Land: 9.31 sq mi (24.12 km^{2})
- Elevation: 3,717 ft (1,133 m)

Population (2025-01-01)
  - Total: 396
- Time zone: UTC+1 (CET)
  - Summer (DST): UTC+2 (CEST)

Gargantilla del Lozoya y Pinilla de Buitrago is a municipality of the Community of Madrid, Spain. It is the municipality with the longest official name in Spain.

== Geography ==
=== Climate ===
According to the Köppen climate classification, Gargantilla del Lozoya y Pinilla de Buitrago have a Csb climate (temperate with a dry and temperate summer).
