= Äteritsiputeritsipuolilautatsijänkä =

Bog region in Savukoski, Lapland, Finland

Coordinates: 67°31′51″N 28°36′04″E

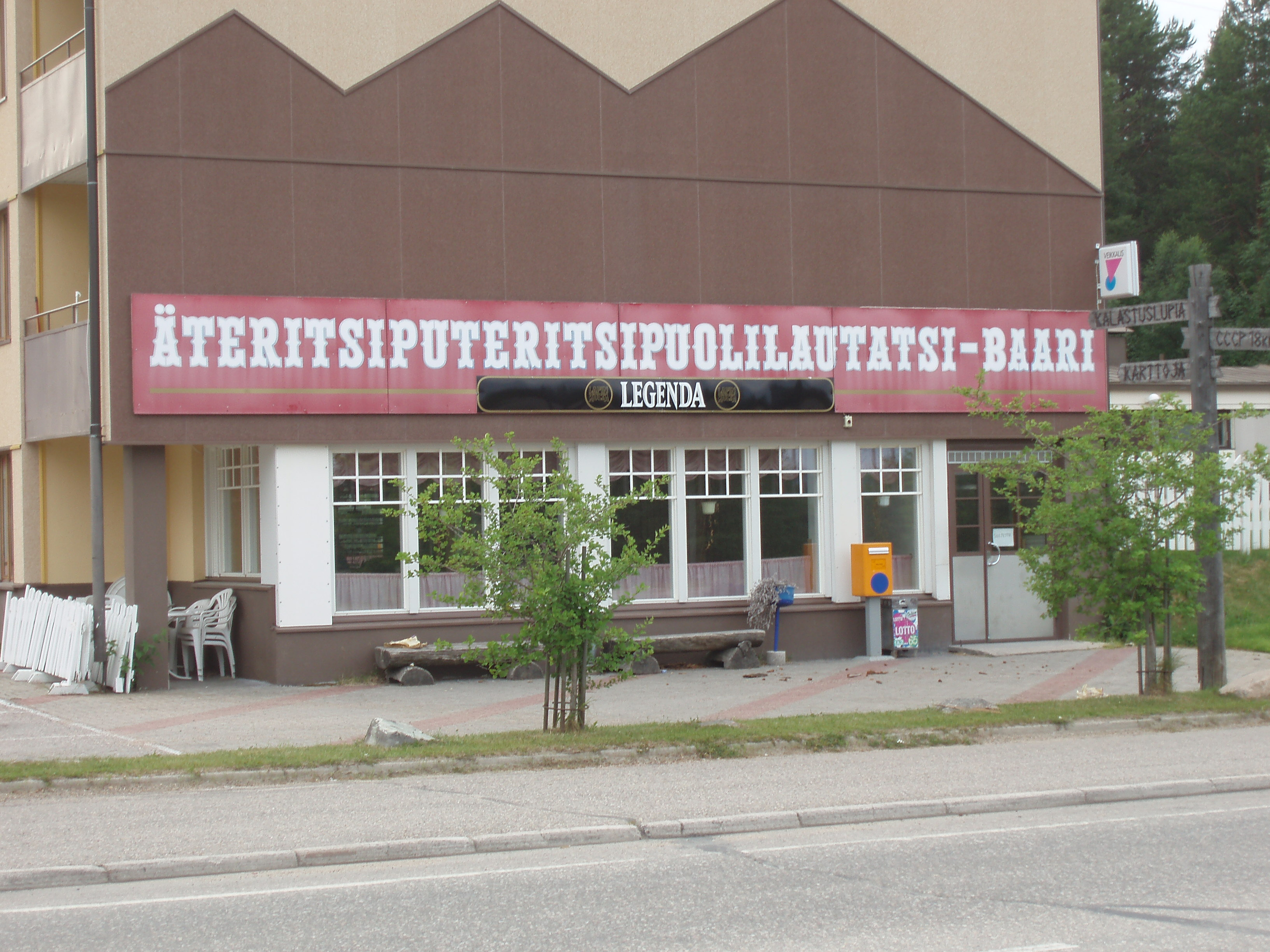
Äteritsiputeritsipuolilautatsi-baari in Salla, Finland.

Äteritsiputeritsipuolilautatsijänkä is a bog region in Savukoski, Lapland in Finland. Its name is 35 letters long and is the longest place name in Finland, and also the third longest, if names with spaces or hyphens are included, in Europe. It has also been the longest official place name in the European Union since 31 January 2020, when Brexit was completed, as the record was previously held by Llanfairpwllgwyngyllgogerychwyrndrobwllllantysiliogogogoch, a village in Wales, United Kingdom.

== Placename and toponymy ==
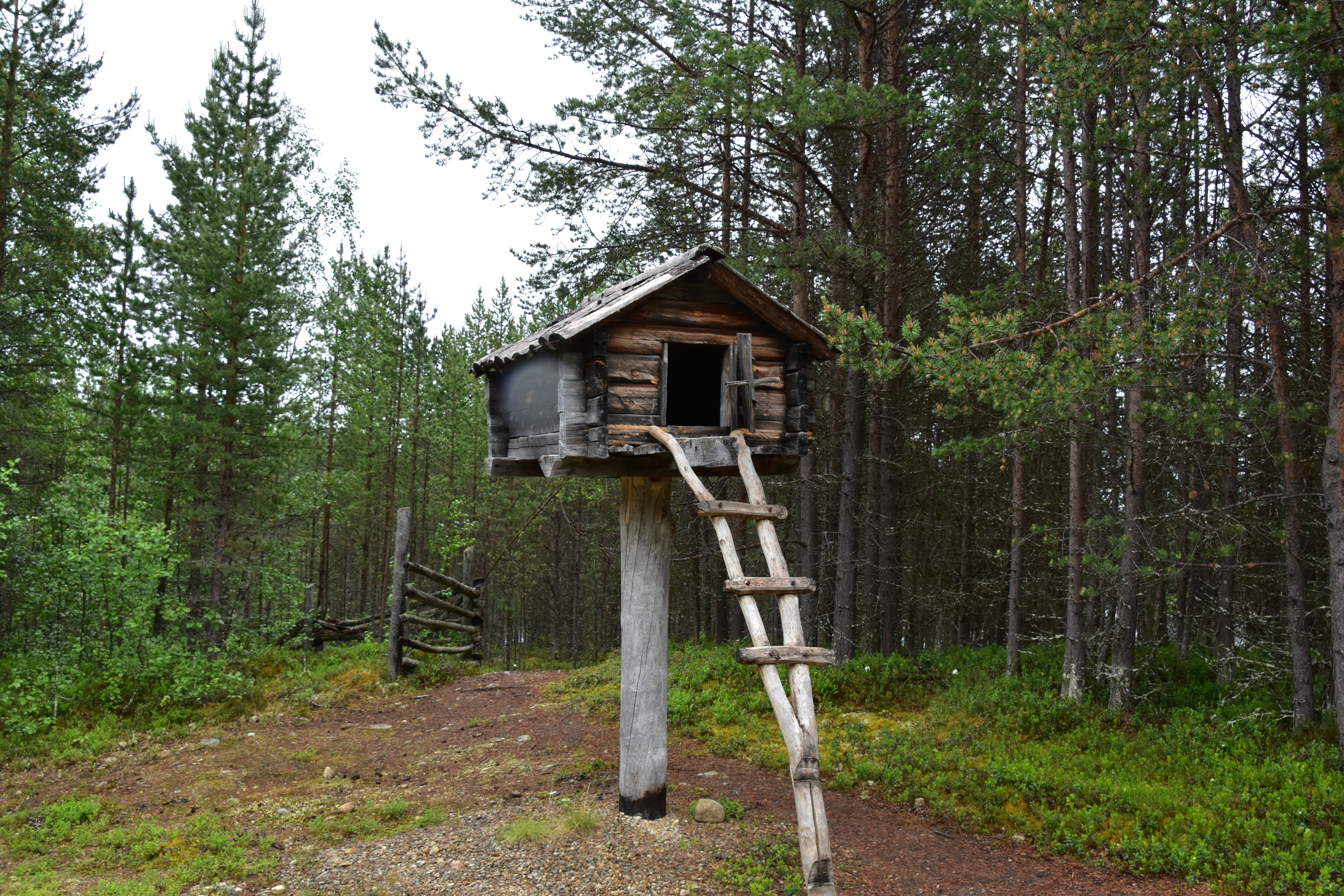
Elevated storage facility, Siida museum, Inari, Finland.

The coat of arms of the municipality of Savukoski, Finland.

According to Finnish linguist Taarna Valtonen, the name can be decomposed as:

Äteri=tsi|puteri=tsi|puoli|lauta=tsi|jänkä

from various Sámi parts (< *adderidži pjedaridži puoꞷᵉli + -lauta=tsi- + jänkä):

- adderidži: possibly from a Samic given name (compare Skolt Sami Oʹnddri) that is cognate with Finnish Antero (<< Latin Andreas); the ending is either a Samic diminutive ending or possibly from a Slavic patronymic suffix
- pjedaridži: possibly from a Samic given name that is cognate with Finnish Pietari (<< Ancient Greek Πέτρος (Pétros)), same ending as above
- puoꞷᵉli: possibly from a Samic given name (compare Skolt Sami Paavvâl) that is cognate with Finnish Paavali (<< Latin Paulus); the variant would have had a vowel *-uo-, which is not attested
- -lauta=tsi-: akin to Inari Sami láávtáš (meaning niliaitta in Finnish, njalla in Northern Sámi, or kind of "bear cache" in English; the word is cognate with Finnish lautta, "raft", not lauta, "board")

thus possibly the name would translate as:

"The bog on which the storage hut standing on a single pillar and belonging to 'Paul', the son of 'Peter', the son of 'Andrew', stands/stood on".

== In popular culture ==
A pub in Salla was named Äteritsiputeritsipuolilautatsi-baari after this bog region. According to an anecdote, the owner of the pub tried many different names for it, but all of them had already been taken. Frustrated, he registered the pub under a name he knew no one else would be using. The pub also had the longest name of a registered commercial establishment in Finland. The bar was in practice known as Äteritsi-baari. The pub was closed in April 2006.
