= Matveyevsky District =

Matveyevsky District Матвеевский район (Russian)
- District
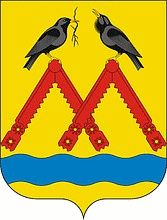
- Coat of arms
- Location of Matveyevsky District in Orenburg Oblast
- Coordinates: 53°30′34″N 53°28′44″E
- Country: Russia
- Federal subject: Orenburg Oblast
- Established: 1935
- Administrative center: Matveyevka

Area
  - Total: 1,800 km^{2} (690 sq mi)

Population (2010 Census)
  - Total: 12,267
  - Density: 6.8/km^{2} (18/sq mi)
  - Urban: 0%
  - Rural: 100%

Administrative structure
  - Administrative divisions: 16 Selsoviets
  - Inhabited localities: 35 rural localities

Municipal structure
  - Municipally incorporated as: Matveyevsky Municipal District
  - Municipal divisions: 0 urban settlements, 14 rural settlements
- Time zone: UTC+5 (MSK+2)
- OKTMO ID: 53627000
- Website: http://www.matveevka56.ru/

Matveyevsky District (Russian: Матве́евский райо́н) is an administrative and municipal district (raion), one of the thirty-five in Orenburg Oblast, Russia. It is located in the northwest of the oblast. The area of the district is 1,800 square kilometers (690 sq mi). Its administrative center is the rural locality (a selo) of Matveyevka. Population: 12,267 (2010 Census); 15,627 (2002 census); 15,704 (1989 Soviet census). The population of Matveyevka accounts for 24.8% of the district's total population.
