= Longest word in English =

The identity of the longest word in English depends on the definition of "word" and of length.

Words may be derived naturally from the language's roots or formed by coinage and construction. Additionally, comparisons are complicated because place names may be considered words, technical terms may be arbitrarily long, and the addition of suffixes and prefixes may extend the length of words to create grammatically correct but unused or novel words. Different dictionaries include and omit different words.

The length of a word may also be understood in multiple ways. Most commonly, length is based on orthography (conventional spelling rules) and counting the number of written letters. Alternate, but less common, approaches include phonology (the spoken language) and the number of phonemes (sounds).

Word	Letters	Meaning	Claim	Dispute
methionylthreonylthreonylglutaminylalanyl...isoleucine	189,819	The chemical composition of titin, the largest known protein	Longest known word overall by magnitudes. Attempts to say the entire word have taken two to three and a half hours.	Technical; not in dictionary; whether this should actually be considered a word is disputed
methionylglutaminylarginyltyrosylglutamyl...serine	1,909	The chemical name of E. coli TrpA (P0A877)	Longest published word	Technical
lopadotemachoselachogaleokranioleipsano...pterygon	183	A fictional dish of food	Longest word coined by a major author, the longest word ever to appear in literature	Contrived nonce word; not in dictionary; Ancient Greek transliteration
pneumonoultramicroscopicsilicovolcanoconiosis	45	The disease silicosis	Longest word in a major dictionary	Contrived coinage to make it the longest word; technical, but only mentioned and never actually used in communication
supercalifragilisticexpialidocious	34	Unclear – generally understood as a positive adjective or a nonsense word	Made popular in the Mary Poppins film and musical	Contrived coinage
pseudopseudohypoparathyroidism	30	A hereditary medical disorder	Longest non-contrived word in a major dictionary	Technical
antidisestablishmentarianism	28	The political position of opposing disestablishment	Longest non-contrived and nontechnical word	Not all dictionaries accept it due to lack of usage.
honorificabilitudinitatibus	27	The state of being able to achieve honors	Longest word in Shakespeare's works; longest word in the English language featuring alternating consonants and vowels	Latin

== Major dictionaries ==
The longest word in any of the major English language dictionaries is pneumonoultramicroscopicsilicovolcanoconiosis (45 letters), a word that refers to a lung disease contracted from the inhalation of very fine silica particles, specifically from a volcano; medically, it is the same as silicosis. The word was deliberately coined to be the longest word in English.

The Oxford English Dictionary contains pseudopseudohypoparathyroidism (30 letters).

Merriam-Webster's Collegiate Dictionary does not contain antidisestablishmentarianism (28 letters), as the editors found no widespread, sustained usage of the word in its original meaning. The longest word in that dictionary is electroencephalographically (27 letters).

The longest non-technical word in major dictionaries is floccinaucinihilipilification at 29 letters. Consisting of a series of Latin words meaning "nothing" and defined as "the act of estimating something as worthless"; its usage has been recorded as far back as 1741.

Ross Eckler has noted that most of the longest English words are not likely to occur in general text, meaning non-technical present-day text seen by casual readers, in which the author did not specifically intend to use an unusually long word. According to Eckler, the longest words likely to be encountered in general text are deinstitutionalisation (or deinstitutionalization) and counterrevolutionaries, with 22 letters each.

A computer study of over a million samples of normal English prose found that the longest word one is likely to encounter on an everyday basis is uncharacteristically, at 20 letters.

== Creations of long words ==
=== Coinages ===
In his play Assemblywomen (Ecclesiazousae), the ancient Greek comedic playwright Aristophanes created a word of 171 letters (183 in the transliteration below), which describes a dish by stringing together its ingredients:

Lopadotemachoselachogaleokranioleipsanodrimhypotrimmatosilphiokarabomelitokatakechymenokichlepikossyphophattoperisteralektryonoptekephalliokigklopeleiolagoiosiraiobaphetraganopterygon.

Henry Carey's farce Chrononhotonthologos (1743) holds the opening line: "Aldiborontiphoscophornio! Where left you Chrononhotonthologos?"

Thomas Love Peacock put these creations into the mouth of the phrenologist Mr. Cranium in his 1816 book Headlong Hall: osteosarchaematosplanchnochondroneuromuelous (44 characters) and osseocarnisanguineoviscericartilaginonervomedullary (51 characters).

James Joyce made up nine 100-letter words plus one 101-letter word in his novel Finnegans Wake, the most famous of which is bababadalgharaghtakamminarronnkonnbronntonnerronntuonnthunntrovarrhounawnskawntoohoohoordenenthurnuk. Appearing on the first page, it allegedly represents the symbolic thunderclap associated with the fall of Adam and Eve. As it appears nowhere else except in reference to this passage, it is generally not accepted as a real word. Sylvia Plath made mention of it in her semi-autobiographical novel The Bell Jar, when the protagonist was reading Finnegans Wake.

"Supercalifragilisticexpialidocious", the 34-letter title of a song from the movie Mary Poppins, does appear in several dictionaries, but only as a proper noun defined in reference to the song title. The attributed meaning is "a word that you say when you don't know what to say." The idea and invention of the word is credited to songwriters Robert and Richard Sherman.

=== Agglutinative constructions ===
The English language permits the legitimate extension of existing words to serve new purposes by the addition of prefixes and suffixes. This is sometimes referred to as agglutinative construction. This process can create arbitrarily long words: for example, the prefixes pseudo (false, spurious) and anti (against, opposed to) can be added as many times as desired. More familiarly, the addition of numerous "great"s to a relative, such as "great-great-great-great-grandparent", can produce words of arbitrary length. In musical notation, an 8192nd note may be called a semihemidemisemihemidemisemihemidemisemiquaver.

Antidisestablishmentarianism is the longest common example of a word formed by agglutinative construction.

=== Technical terms ===
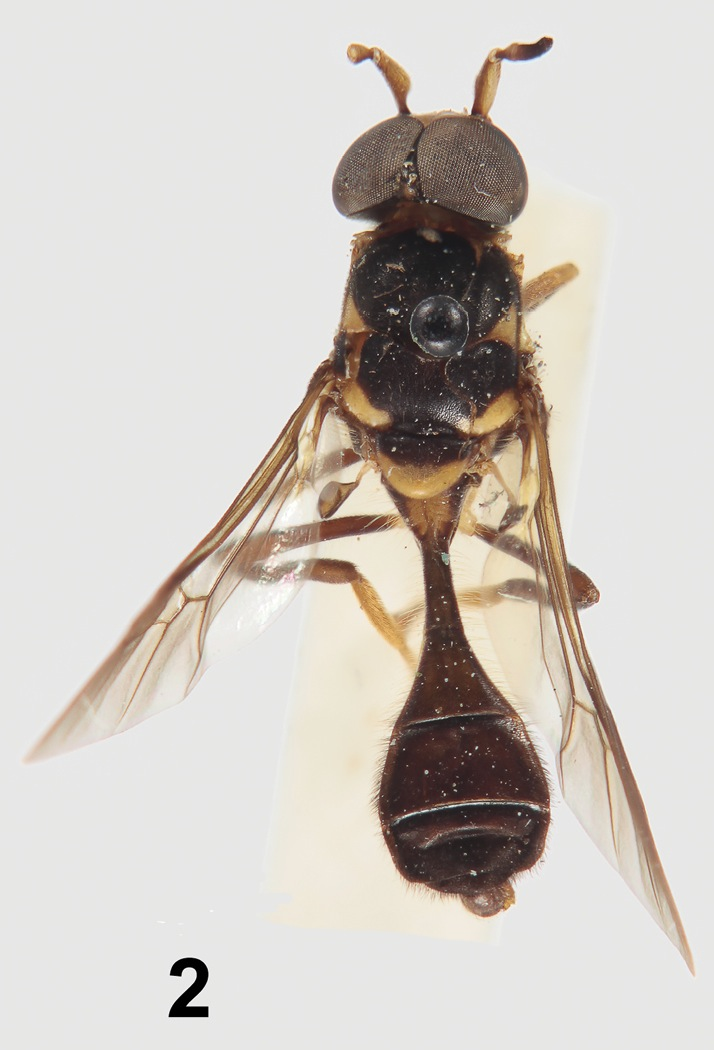
Parastratiosphecomyia stratiosphecomyioides

A number of scientific naming schemes can be used to generate arbitrarily long words.

The IUPAC nomenclature for organic chemical compounds is open-ended, giving rise to the 189,819-letter chemical name Methionylthreonylthreonyl . . . isoleucine for the protein also known as titin, which is involved in striated muscle formation. In nature, DNA molecules can be much bigger than protein molecules and therefore potentially be referred to with much longer chemical names. For example, the wheat chromosome 3B contains almost 1 billion base pairs, so the sequence of one of its strands, if written out in full like Adenilyladenilylguanilylcystidylthymidyl . . . , would be about 8 billion letters long. The longest published word, Acetylseryltyrosylseryliso . . . serine, referring to the coat protein of a certain strain of tobacco mosaic virus (P03575), is 1,185 letters long, and appeared in the American Chemical Society's Chemical Abstracts Service in 1964 and 1966. In 1965, the Chemical Abstracts Service overhauled its naming system and started discouraging excessively long names. In 2011, a dictionary broke P03575's record with a 1,909-letter word describing the trpA protein (P0A877).

John Horton Conway and Landon Curt Noll developed an open-ended system for naming powers of 10, in which one sexmilliaquingensexagintillion, coming from the Latin name for 6,560, is the name for 10^{3(6,560+1)} = 10^{19,683}. Under the long number scale, it would be 10^{6(6,560)} = 10^{39,360}.

Gammaracanthuskytodermogammarus loricatobaicalensis is sometimes cited as the longest binomial name—it is a kind of amphipod. However, this name, proposed by B. Dybowski, was invalidated by the International Commission on Zoological Nomenclature in 1929 after being petitioned by Mary J. Rathbun to take up the case.

Myxococcus llanfairpwllgwyngyllgogerychwyrndrobwllllantysiliogogogochensis is the longest accepted binomial name for an organism. It is a bacterium found in soil collected at Llanfairpwllgwyngyll (discussed below). Parastratiosphecomyia stratiosphecomyioides is the longest accepted binomial name for any animal and any organism visible with the naked eye. It is a species of soldier fly. The genus name Parapropalaehoplophorus (a fossil glyptodont, an extinct family of mammals related to armadillos) is two letters longer, but does not contain a similarly long species name.

Aequeosalinocalcalinoceraceoaluminosocupreovitriolic, at 52 letters, describing the spa waters at Bath, England, is attributed to Dr. Edward Strother (1675–1737). The word is composed of the following elements:

- Aequeo: equal (Latin, aequo)
- Salino: containing salt (Latin, salinus)
- Calcalino: calcium (Latin, calx)
- Ceraceo: waxy (Latin, cera)
- Aluminoso: alumina (Latin)
- Cupreo: from "copper"
- Vitriolic: resembling vitriol

== Notable long words ==
=== Place names ===
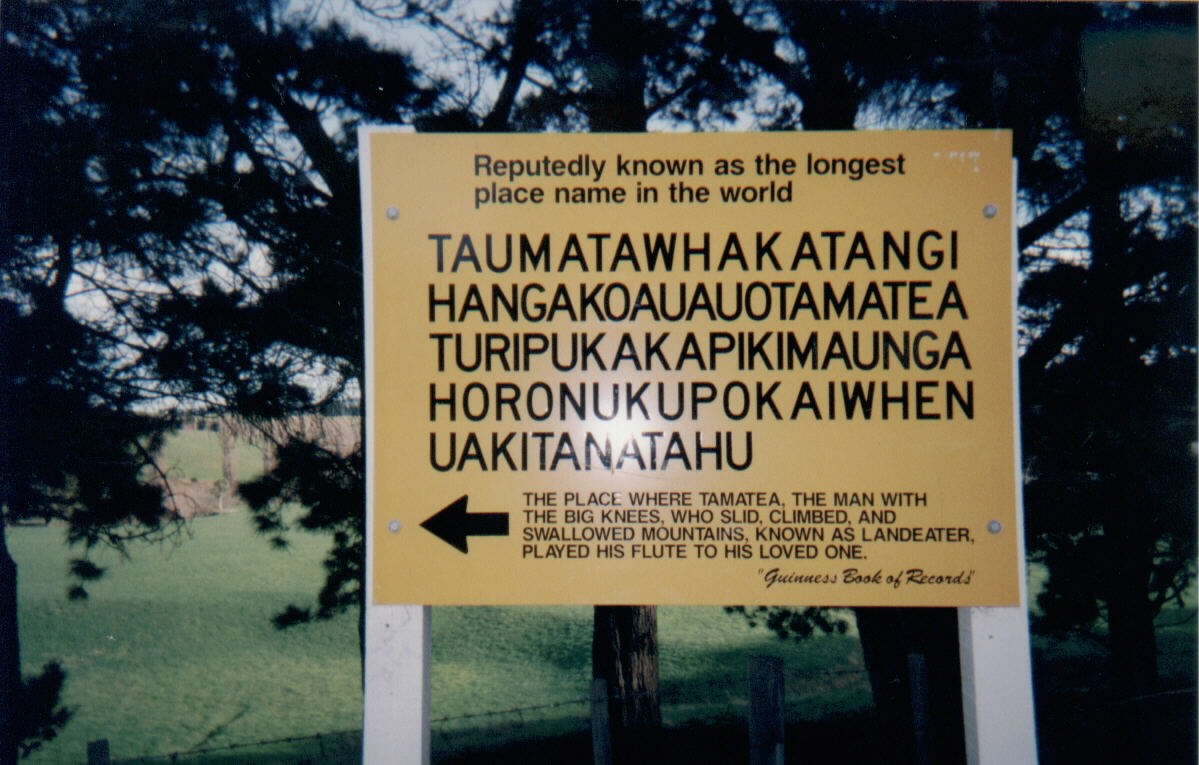
The sign at Taumatawhakatangihangakoauauotamateaturipukakapikimaungahoronukupokaiwhenuakitanatahu

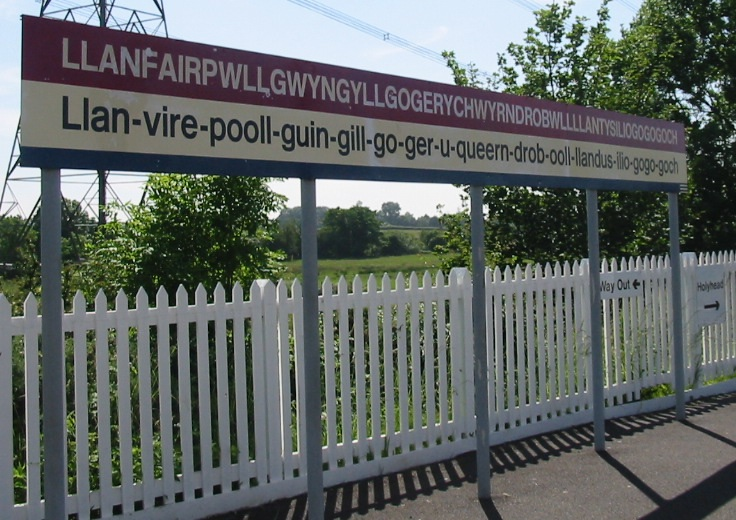
The station sign at Llanfairpwllgwyngyllgogerychwyrndrobwllllantysiliogogogoch in North Wales

The longest officially recognized place name in an English-speaking country is Taumatawhakatangihangakoauauotamateaturipukakapikimaungahoronukupokaiwhenuakitanatahu (85 letters), which is a hill in New Zealand (see the signpost photo on this page). The name is in the Māori language. There are several variant spellings of the name, including some that are longer. In Māori, the digraphs ng and wh are each treated as single letters.

The 58-letter name Llanfairpwllgwyngyllgogerychwyrndrobwllllantysiliogogogoch is the name of a town on Anglesey, an island of Wales. In terms of the traditional Welsh alphabet, the name is only 51 letters long, as certain digraphs in Welsh are considered as single letters, for instance ll, ng and ch. It is generally agreed, however, that this invented name, adopted in the mid-19th century, was contrived solely to be the longest name of any town in Britain. The official name of the place is Llanfairpwllgwyngyll, commonly abbreviated to Llanfairpwll or Llanfair PG.

The longest non-contrived place name in the United Kingdom which is a single non-hyphenated word is Cottonshopeburnfoot (19 letters) and the longest which is hyphenated is Sutton-under-Whitestonecliffe (29 characters).

The longest place name in the United States (45 letters) is Chargoggagoggmanchauggagoggchaubunagungamaugg, a lake in Webster, Massachusetts. It means "Fishing Place at the Boundaries – Neutral Meeting Grounds" and is sometimes facetiously translated as "you fish your side of the water, I fish my side of the water, nobody fishes the middle". The lake is also known as Webster Lake. The longest hyphenated names in the U.S. are Winchester-on-the-Severn, a town in Maryland, and Washington-on-the-Brazos, a notable place in Texas history. The longest single-word town names in the U.S. are Kleinfeltersville, Pennsylvania and Mooselookmeguntic, Maine.

The longest official geographical name in Australia is Mamungkukumpurangkuntjunya. It has 26 letters and is a Pitjantjatjara word meaning "where the Devil urinates".

Liechtenstein is the longest single-word country name in English, and the second-longest is Turkmenistan.

=== Personal names ===
Guinness World Records contains a category for longest personal name used.

- From about 1975 to 1985, the recordholder was Adolph Blaine Charles David Earl Frederick Gerald Hubert Irvin John Kenneth Lloyd Martin Nero Oliver Paul Quincy Randolph Sherman Thomas Uncas Victor William Xerxes Yancy Zeus Wolfeschlegelsteinhausenbergerdorffvoralternwarengewissenhaftschaferswessenschafewarenwohlgepflegeundsorgfaltigkeitbeschutzenvonangreifendurchihrraubgierigfeindewelchevoralternzwolftausendjahresvorandieerscheinenwanderersteerdemenschderraumschiffgebrauchlichtalsseinursprungvonkraftgestartseinlangefahrthinzwischensternartigraumaufdersuchenachdiesternwelchegehabtbewohnbarplanetenkreisedrehensichundwohinderneurassevonverstandigmenschlichkeitkonntefortplanzenundsicherfreuenanlebenslanglichfreudeundruhemitnichteinfurchtvorangreifenvonandererintelligentgeschopfsvonhinzwischensternartigraum, Senior (746 letters), also known as Wolfe+585, Senior.
- After 1985 Guinness briefly awarded the record to a newborn girl with a longer name.
- Laurence Watkins of New Zealand has held the record since March 8, 1990. His name consists of 2,253 words.

Long birth names are often coined in protest of naming laws or for other personal reasons.

- The naming law in Sweden was challenged by parents Lasse Diding and Elisabeth Hallin, who proposed the given name "Brfxxccxxmnpcccclllmmnprxvclmnckssqlbb11116" for their child (pronounced [ˈǎlːbɪn], 43 characters), which was rejected by a district court in Halmstad, southern Sweden.

=== Words with certain characteristics of notable length ===
- Schmaltzed and strengthed (10 letters) appear to be the longest monosyllabic words recorded in The Oxford English Dictionary, while scraunched and scroonched appear to be the longest monosyllabic words recorded in Webster's Third New International Dictionary; but squirrelled (11 letters) is the longest if pronounced as one syllable only (as permitted in The Shorter Oxford English Dictionary and Merriam-Webster Online Dictionary at squirrel, and in Longman Pronunciation Dictionary). Schtroumpfed (12 letters) was coined by Umberto Eco, while broughammed (11 letters) was coined by William Harmon after broughamed (10 letters) was coined by George Bernard Shaw.
- Strengths is the longest word in the English language containing only one vowel letter.
- Euouae, a medieval musical term, is the longest English word consisting only of vowels, and the word with the most consecutive vowels. However, the "word" itself is simply a mnemonic consisting of the vowels to be sung in the phrase "seculorum Amen" at the end of the lesser doxology. (Although u was often used interchangeably with v, and the variant "Evovae" is occasionally used, the v in these cases would still be a vowel.)
- The longest words with no repeated letters are subdermatoglyphic, dermatoglyphics, and uncopyrightable.
- The longest word whose letters are in alphabetical order is the eight-letter Aegilops, a grass genus. However, this is arguably a proper noun. There are several six-letter English words with their letters in alphabetical order, including abhors, almost, begins, biopsy, chimps, and chintz. There are a few 7-letter words, such as "billowy" and "beefily". The longest words whose letters are in reverse alphabetical order are sponged, wronged, and trollied.
- The longest word without any of the main five vowels but including Y is Twyndyllyng.
- The longest words recorded in OED with each vowel only once, and in order, are abstemiously, affectiously, and tragediously (OED). Fracedinously and gravedinously (constructed from adjectives in OED) have thirteen letters; Gadspreciously, constructed from Gadsprecious (in OED), has fourteen letters. Facetiously is among the few other words directly attested in OED with single occurrences of all six vowels (counting y as a vowel).
- The longest word without descenders or ascenders is overnumerousnesses.
- The longest single palindromic word in English is rotavator, another name for a rotary tiller for breaking and aerating soil.

== See also ==
- Lipogram
- List of long species names
- List of the longest English words with one syllable
- Longest English sentence
- Longest word in French
- Longest word in Romanian
- Longest word in Spanish
- Longest word in Turkish
- Number of words in English
- Scriptio continua
- Sesquipedalianism
- Donaudampfschiffahrtselektrizitätenhauptbetriebswerkbauunterbeamtengesellschaft, longest published word in German
