= Rinderkennzeichnungs- und Rindfleischetikettierungsüberwachungsaufgabenübertragungsgesetz =

Repealed law of Mecklenburg-Vorpommern, Germany

The Rinderkennzeichnungs- und Rindfleischetikettierungsüberwachungsaufgabenübertragungsgesetz (German pronunciation: [ˈʁɪndɐˌkɛntsaɪçnʊŋs ʊnt ˈʁɪntflaɪʃʔetikɛˈtiːʁʊŋsʔyːbɐˈvaxʊŋsˌʔaʊfɡaːbn̩ʔyːbɐˈtʁaːɡʊŋsɡəˌzɛts]; RkReÜAÜG; lit. 'cattle marking and beef labeling supervision duties delegation law') was a law of the German state of Mecklenburg-Vorpommern of 1999, repealed in 2013. It dealt with the supervision of the labeling of beef after an outbreak of mad cow disease.

The name of the law is a famous example of the virtually unlimited compounding of nouns that is possible in many Germanic languages. German orthography uses "closed" compounds, concatenating nouns to form one long word. This is unlike most English compounds, which are separated using spaces or hyphens.

Technically it is made up of two words, because a hyphen at the end of a word is used to show that the word will end in the same way as the following. Consequently, the two words would be Rinderkennzeichnungsüberwachungsaufgabenübertragungsgesetz and Rindfleischetikettierungsüberwachungsaufgabenübertragungsgesetz, coming in at 58 and 63 letters, respectively.

This is the official short title of the law; its full name is Gesetz zur Übertragung der Aufgaben für die Überwachung der Rinderkennzeichnung und Rindfleischetikettierung, i.e. "law on the delegation of duties for the supervision of cattle marking and beef labeling". Most German laws have a short title consisting of a composite noun.

Words this long are not very common in German. When the law was proposed in the state parliament, the members reacted with laughter and the responsible minister Till Backhaus apologized for the "possibly excessive length". In 1999, the Association for the German Language nominated Rindfleischetikettierungsüberwachungsaufgabenübertragungsgesetz for its Word of the Year award, but it lost to the topical word Millennium.

In 2003, the Bundesrat issued a decree that modified some real estate-related regulations, named the Grundstücksverkehrsgenehmigungszuständigkeitsübertragungsverordnung ("regulation on the delegation of authority concerning land conveyance permissions"). With 67 letters in its name, it surpassed the RkReÜAÜG, but was repealed in 2007.

== See also ==
- German compounds
- Taumatawhakatangihangakoauauotamateaturipukakapikimaungahoronukupokaiwhenuakitanatahu
- Donaudampfschiffahrtselektrizitätenhauptbetriebswerkbauunterbeamtengesellschaft
- Llanfairpwllgwyngyllgogerychwyrndrobwllllantysiliogogogoch
- Longest word in English
- Scriptio continua
