= Hubert Blaine Wolfeschlegelsteinhausenbergerdorff Sr. =

American typesetter with longest name ever (1914–1997)

- Born: c. 4 August 1914; Bergedorf, Germany
- Died: 24 October 1997 (aged 83); Philadelphia, Pennsylvania, U.S.
- Occupation: Typesetter
- Spouse: Constance Weber
- Children: Hubert Blaine Jr.; Timothy Wayne

Hubert Blaine Wolfeschlegelsteinhausenbergerdorff Sr. (4 August 1914 – 24 October 1997; surname also given as Wolfstern, Wolfe + 666, Wolfe+585, Wolfe+590, and others) was a German-born American typesetter who held the record for the longest personal name ever used.

Hubert's world record name was made up from 27 names. Each of his 26 given names starts with a different letter of the English alphabet in alphabetical order; these are followed by a long single-word last name. The exact length and spelling of his name has been a subject of considerable confusion due in part to its various renderings over the years, many of which have typographical errors. One of the longest and most reliable published versions, with a 666-letter surname, follows:

Adolph Blaine Charles David Earl Frederick Gerald Hubert Irvin John Kenneth Lloyd Martin Nero Oliver Paul Quincy Randolph Sherman Thomas Uncas Victor William Xerxes Yancy Zeus Wolfeschlegelsteinhausenbergerdorffwelchevoralternwarengewissenhaftschaferswessenschafewarenwohlgepflegeundsorgfaltigkeitbeschutzenvorangreifendurchihrraubgierigfeindewelchevoralternzwolfhunderttausendjahresvorandieerscheinenvonderersteerdemenschderraumschiffgenachtmittungsteinundsiebeniridiumelektrischmotorsgebrauchlichtalsseinursprungvonkraftgestartseinlangefahrthinzwischensternartigraumaufdersuchennachbarschaftdersternwelchegehabtbewohnbarplanetenkreisedrehensichundwohinderneuerassevonverstandigmenschlichkeitkonntefortpflanzenundsicherfreuenanlebenslanglichfreudeundruhemitnichteinfurchtvorangreifenvorandererintelligentgeschopfsvonhinzwischensternartigraum Sr. (Note: The following formatting may increase the legibility of the last name: Wolfeschlegel-Steinhausen-Bergerdorff, welche Vorältern waren gewissenhaft Schäfers, wessen Schafe waren wohl, gepflege und sorgfältigkeit beschützen vor Angreifen durch ihr raubgierig Feinde, welche Vorältern, zwölfhunderttausend Jahres voran die Erscheinen von der erste Erdemensch, der Raumschiff genacht mit Tungstein und sieben Iridium elektrisch Motors, gebrauch Licht als sein Ursprung von Kraft, gestart sein lange Fahrt hinzwischen sternartig Raum auf der Suchen Nachbarschaft der Stern, welche gehabt bewohnbar Planeten, Kreise drehen sich, und wohin der neue Rasse von verständig Menschlichkeit konnte fortpflanzen und sich erfreuen an lebenslänglich Freude und Ruhe, mit nicht ein Furcht vor Angreifen vor anderer intelligent Geschöpfs von hinzwischen sternartig Raum.)

The Guinness World Records verified the version as follows:

Adolph Blaine Charles David Earl Frederick Gerald Hubert Irvin John Kenneth Lloyd Martin Nero Oliver Paul Quincy Randolph Sherman Thomas Uncas Victor William Xerxes Yancy Zeus Wolfeschlegelsteinhausenbergerdorffwelchevoralternwarengewissenhaftschaferswessenschafewarenwohlgepflegeundsorgfaltigkeitbeschutzenvonangreifendurchihrraubgierigfeindewelchevoralternzwolftausendjahresvorandieerscheinenvanderersteerdemenschderraumschiffgebrauchlichtalsseinursprungvonkraftgestartseinlangefahrthinzwischensternartigraumaufdersuchenachdiesternwelchegehabtbewohnbarplanetenkreisedrehensichundwohinderneurassevonverstandigmenschlichkeitkonntefortpflanzenundsicherfreuenanlebenslanglichfreudeundruhemitnichteinfurchtvorangreifenvonandererintelligentgeschopfsvonhinzwischensternartigraum.

== Biography ==
Wolfeschlegelsteinhausenbergerdorff was born in Bergedorf (now part of Hamburg), Germany, as the son of Violet M. (née Fleisher) and Edward R. Wolfstern. He later emigrated to the United States, settling in Philadelphia. His birthdate has been given as February 29, 1904, but he was also reported to be age 47 in a 1964 wire story, and Philadelphia County death records list a birthdate of August 4, 1914. He became a typesetter according to Bennett Cerf.

His name first attracted attention when it appeared in the 1938 Philadelphia telephone directory on page 1292, column 3, line 17, and in a court order of judge John Boyle of May 25, 1938: "Wolfeschlegelsteinhausenbergerdorff, Jr., etc., vs. Yellow Cab Co., petition for compromise settlement granted"—with speculation that the case was settled because "they couldn't pronounce it".

A son, Hubert Blaine Wolfeschlegelsteinhausenbergerdorff Jr., was born in Philadelphia in 1952, and was able to pronounce his surname by age three. Family letterhead used the form "Hubert Blaine Wolfeschlegelsteinhausenbergerdorff".

When Philadelphia Inquirer journalist Frank Brookhouser omitted the letter "u" in reporting a 1952 Philadelphia voter registration under the 35-letter version of the surname, Wolfeschlegelsteinhausenbergerdorff's prompt correction was carried by Time and passed on to other outlets. Philadelphia's business computers used an abbreviated form on the city's voting registration books; the utility company, however, when told he would not pay his bill unless his name was right, began spelling it properly, on three lines. Brookhouser later responded by tributing the correctly spelled Wolfeschlegelsteinhausenbergerdorff as the exemplar Philadelphian named in the first sentence of his Our Philadelphia, comparing him to another local typesetter, Benjamin Franklin:

Philadelphia, home of Hubert B. Wolfeschlegelsteinhausenbergerdorff, Sr.—like Benjamin Franklin a typesetter—and 2,071,604 other residents according to the last official census in 1950, is the third largest city in the United States of America and the biggest small town in the world.

The executive secretary-treasurer of the American Name Society also provided a 163-letter spelling of the surname: "Wolfeschlegelsteinhausenbergerdorffvoralternwarengewissenhaftschaferswessenschaftswarenwohlgefutternundsorgfaltigkeitbeschutzenvorangreifendurchihrraubgierigfiends", stating that this was his "full name as given ... at birth on the envelope". This spelling was reproduced verbatim by the Maryland and Delaware Genealogist.

In 1964, a widely reprinted Associated Press wire story reported that the IBM 7074 computer at the John Hancock Mutual Life Insurance Co. could process one million policies but refused to handle that of Wolfeschlegelsteinhausenbergerdorff, which was specially processed by hand. He explained to reporter Norman Goldstein, "When somebody calls my name, I don't have any trouble finding out who they mean ... I don't like being part of the common herd." The article includes a 666-letter version of the surname, though individual newspapers which ran it made numerous typographical errors, making it difficult to ascertain which renderings (if any) are correct.

Logologist Dmitri Borgmann devoted several pages to the unusually long name in his 1965 book Language on Vacation. According to Borgmann, the name had never before appeared correctly and in full in any book, and its bearer himself usually signed his name as "Hubert B. Wolfe + 666, Sr.". The long-form version reproduced in Language on Vacation is said to have come from Wolfeschlegelsteinhausenbergerdorff's 1963 Christmas card, and to be the form in which it was submitted to the Associated Press for publication.

Onomastician Elsdon C. Smith, writing in Treasury of Name Lore, provides a 161-letter version of the surname, "Wolfeschlegelsteinhausenbergerdorffvoralternwarengewissenhaftschaferswessenschafswarenwohlgefutternundsorgfalugkeitbeschutzenvorangreifendurchihrraubgierigfeinds", but noted that its holder used only the 35-letter version in correspondence with him. Smith affirmed the personal name was the longest in the United States but implied that Wolfeschlegelsteinhausenbergerdorff was a publicity seeker for adopting it.

Between 1975 and 1985, Wolfeschlegelsteinhausenbergerdorff appeared in the Guinness Book of World Records as having the longest personal name, and was photographed for the book in front of a New York City marquee displaying his name, once again misspelled. He also made personal appearances in television shows based on the Guinness Book. By 1983, only the 35-letter form of the name appeared in the book. Various editions claimed he had recently shortened his surname to "Wolfe+585, Senior" or to "Wolfe+590, Senior". By the 1990 edition, the "longest name" category had disappeared altogether. Since 2021, the name is present in category "Longest personal name".

In 1983, The National Enquirer reported that the winner of its competition to find America's longest name was SnowOwl Sor-Lokken (born 1979), whose Washington birth certificate gives her first name as a concatenation of Snowowl with a version of wolfeschlegelsteinhausenbergerdorff... for a total length reported as 598 letters in the next edition of the Guinness Book. Sor-Lokken's father said he wanted "to throw a monkey wrench into the government bureaucracy". Her given-name length record was broken in 1984.

Wolfeschlegelsteinhausenbergerdorff has also been catalogued by logologist Gyles Brandreth and by The Book of Useless Information.

== Origin and translation of surname ==
Wolfeschlegelsteinhausenbergerdorff claimed that his great-grandfather composed the surname in the 19th century, when German Jews, who had not previously used a second name, had to adopt one. In some printings of the above-noted AP wire story, Wolfeschlegelsteinhausenbergerdorff himself provided the following explanation of his prodigious surname:

It tells a story of a wolf-killer, a resident of a stonehouse in a village, whose ancestors were conscientious shepherds whose sheep were well fed and carefully guarded against attack by ferocious enemies and whose ancestors 1,200,000 years before the first earth man, in a space ship made with tungsten and seven iridium motors and using light as a source of power, started a long journey across interstellar space, searching for a star around which was an inhabitable planet where they could establish a new race of intelligent mankind and where they would live long, happy lives and be free from attack by other intelligentsia from the outer space from whence they came.

Dmitri Borgmann, a fellow emigrant from Germany, held that the 666-letter version of the surname was untranslatable due to its numerous grammatical and spelling errors, but offered his own paraphrase:

Ages ago, there were conscientious shepherds whose sheep were well tended and carefully protected against attack by their rapacious enemies. Twelve hundred thousand years ago there appeared before these first earthmen, at night, a spaceship powered by seven stone and iridium electric motors. It had originally been launched on its long trip into stellar space in the search for neighboring stars that might have planets revolving about them that were inhabitable and on which planets a new race of intelligent humanity might propagate itself and rejoice for life, without fear of attack by other intelligent beings from interstellar space.

The New Dictionary of American Family Names translates the 35-letter form as "a descendant of Wolfeschlegelstein (one who prepared wool for manufacture on a stone), of the house of Bergerdorf (mountain village)"; the Fairleigh Dickinson University Names Institute gives "wolf slayer who lives in the stone house in the mountain village".

== See also ==
- Donaudampfschiffahrtselektrizitätenhauptbetriebswerkbauunterbeamtengesellschaft, the name of a supposed suborganization of the Donaudampfschiffahrtsgesellschaft, in Vienna, Austria, that the Guinness Book of World Records of 1999 said was the longest published word found in the German language
- Llanfairpwllgwyngyllgogerychwyrndrobwllllantysiliogogogoch, the name of a large village and community on the island of Anglesey in Wales that is the longest place name in Europe and the second longest official one-word place name in the world.
- Lopadotemachoselachogaleokranioleipsanodrimhypotrimmatosilphiokarabomelitokatakechymenokichlepikossyphophattoperisteralektryonoptekephalliokigklopeleiolagoiosiraiobaphetraganopterygon, the name of a fictional dish in Aristophanes' comedy Assemblywomen, and the longest word in Ancient Greek.
- Rinderkennzeichnungs- und Rindfleischetikettierungsüberwachungsaufgabenübertragungsgesetz, the name of a state law in Germany (passed in 1999, repealed in 2013) that exhibited an extreme degree of the type of compounding of nouns that can occur in Germanic languages
- Taumatawhakatangihangakoauauotamateaturipukakapikimaungahoronukupokaiwhenuakitanatahu, the Māori name for a hill in New Zealand
- Mary Abigail Kawenaʻulaokalaniahiʻiakaikapoliopele Naleilehuaapele Wiggin Pukui, a Hawaiian scholar, author, composer, hula expert and educator
- Jugemu Jugemu Gokō-no Surikire Kaijarisuigyo-no Suigyōmatsu Unraimatsu Fūraimatsu Kuunerutokoro-ni Sumutokoro Yaburakōji-no Burakōji Paipopaipo Paipo-no Shūringan Shūringan-no Gūrindai Gūrindai-no Ponpokopī-no Ponpokonā-no Chōkyūmei-no Chōsuke, Japanese rakugo story about the eponymous long-named protagonist
- Leone Sextus Denys Oswolf Fraudatifilius Tollemache-Tollemache de Orellana Plantagenet Tollemache-Tollemache, British Army captain in World War I.
- Alfonso María Isabel Francisco Eugenio Gabriel Pedro Sebastián Pelayo Fernando Francisco de Paula Pío Miguel Rafael Juan José Joaquín Ana Zacarias Elisabeth Simeón Tereso Pedro Pablo Tadeo Santiago Simón Lucas Juan Mateo Andrés Bartolomé Ambrosio Geronimo Agustín Bernardo Candido Gerardo Luis-Gonzaga Filomeno Camilo Cayetano Andrés-Avelino Bruno Joaquín-Picolimini Felipe Luis-Rey-de-Francia Ricardo Esteban-Protomártir Genaro Nicolás Estanislao-de-Koska Lorenzo Vicente Crisostomo Cristano Darío Ignacio Francisco-Javier Francisco-de-Borja Higona Clemente Esteban-de-Hungría Ladislado Enrique Ildefonso Hermenegildo Carlos-Borromeo Eduardo Francisco-Régis Vicente-Ferrer Pascual Miguel-de-los-Santos Adriano Venancio Valentín Benito José-Oriol Domingo Florencio Alfacio Benére Domingo-de-Silos Ramón Isidro Manuel Antonio Todos-los-Santos de Borbón y Borbón, Spanish nobleman with 88 forenames
- List of longest names in Taiwan
