= List of the longest English words with one syllable =

This is a list of candidates for the longest English word of one syllable, i.e. monosyllables with the most letters. A list of 9,123 English monosyllables published in 1957 includes three ten-letter words: scraunched, scroonched, and squirreled. Guinness World Records lists scraunched and strengthed. Other sources include words as long or longer. Some candidates are questionable on grounds of spelling, pronunciation, or status as obsolete, nonstandard, proper noun, loanword, or nonce word. Thus, the definition of longest English word with one syllable is somewhat subjective, and there is no single unambiguously correct answer.

== List ==
word	pronunciation	letters	source	notes
broughammed	/ˈbruːmd/	11	Sc.Am.	Meaning "travelled by brougham", by analogy with bussed, biked, carted etc. Rhymes with fumed, zoomed. Suggested by poet William Harmon in a competition to find the longest monosyllable.
squirrelled	/ˈskwɜːrld/	11	LPD; MWOD	Compressed American pronunciation of a word which has two syllables /ˈskwɪrəld/ in British Received Proununciation. The monosyllabic pronunciation rhymes with world, curled. In the United States, the given spelling is a variant of the more common squirreled (see -led and -lled spellings).
broughamed	/ˈbruːmd/	10	Shaw	A variant of broughammed, used by George Bernard Shaw in a piece of journalism.
schmaltzed	/ˈʃmɔːltst/, /ˈʃmɒltst/, /ˈʃmæltst/	10	OED	Meaning "imparted a sentimental atmosphere to" e.g. of music; with a 1969 attestation for the past tense.
schnappsed	/ˈʃnæpst/	10	Sc.Am.	Meaning "drank schnapps"; proposed by poet George Starbuck in the same competition won by his friend William Harmon.
schwartzed	/ˈʃwɔːrtst/	10		Meaning "responded 'Schwartz' to a player without making eye-contact" in the game Zoom Schwartz Profigliano.
scraunched	/ˈskrɔːnʃt/	10	W3NID; Moser	A "chiefly dialect" word, meaning "crunched".
scroonched	/ˈskrʊnʃt/	10	W3NID; Moser	A variant of scrunched, meaning "squeezed".
scrootched	/ˈskruːtʃt/	10	AHD	A variant of scrooched, meaning "crouched".
squirreled	/ˈskwɜːrld/	10	LPD; MWOD; Moser	The more usual American spelling of squirrelled.
strengthed	/ˈstrɛŋθt/	10	OED	An obsolete verb meaning "strengthen", "force", and "summon one's strength". The latest citation is 1614 (1479 for strengthed), at which time the Early Modern English pronunciation would have been disyllabic.

== Proper names ==
Some nine-letter proper names remain monosyllabic when adding a tenth letter and apostrophe to form the possessive:

- Laugharne's /ˈlɑːrnz/
- Scoughall's /ˈskoʊlz/

In his short story, "Strychnine in the Soup", P. G. Wodehouse had a character whose surname was "Mapledurham", pronounced "Mum". This is eleven letters, while "Mapledurham's" is twelve.

It is productive in English to convert a (proper) noun into an eponymous verb or adjective:

- A 2007–08 promotion in France used the slogan "Do you Schweppes?", implying a past tense Schweppesed (11 letters) for the putative verb.
- Schwartzed (10 letters) has been used to mean "(re)designed in the style of Martha Schwartz"
- Schwartzed has also been used to mean "crossed swords with Justice Alan R. Schwartz"
- Schmertzed (10 letters) has been used to mean "received undue largesse from New York City through the intervention of negotiator Eric Schmertz"

== Contrived endings ==
In a 1970 article in Word Ways, Ralph G. Beaman converts past participles ending -ed into nouns, allowing regular plurals with -s. He lists five verbs in Webster's Third International generating 10-letter monosyllables scratcheds, screecheds, scroungeds, squelcheds, stretcheds; from the verb strength in Webster's Second International, he forms the 11-letter strengtheds.

The past tense ending -ed and the archaic second person singular ending -st can be combined into -edst; for example "In the day when I cried thou answeredst me, and strengthenedst me with strength in my soul" (Psalm 138:3). While this ending is usually pronounced as a separate syllable from the verb stem, it may be abbreviated -'dst to indicate elision. Attested examples include scratch'dst and stretch'dst, each of which has one syllable spelled with ten letters plus apostrophe.

== See also ==
- Longest word in English
