= Pneumonoultramicroscopicsilicovolcanoconiosis =

Longest English-language dictionary word

Pneumonoultramicroscopicsilicovolcanoconiosis (/ˌnjuːmənoʊˌʌltrəˌmaɪkrəˈskɒpɪkˌsɪlɪkoʊvɒlˌkeɪnoʊˌkoʊniˈoʊsɪs/ NEW-mə-noh-ultrə-my-krə-SKOP-ik-SIL-ih-koh-vol-KAY-noh-koh-nee-OH-sis) is a 45-letter word coined in 1935 by Everett M. Smith, the then-president of the National Puzzlers' League. It has sometimes been used as a synonym for the occupational disease known as silicosis; however, this term is incorrect, as most silicosis is not related to inhalation of volcanic dusts. Silicosis is a form of occupational lung disease caused by inhalation of crystalline silica dust, and is marked by inflammation and scarring in the form of nodular lesions in the upper lobes of the lungs. It is a type of pneumoconiosis. Pneumonoultramicroscopicsilicovolcanoconiosis is the longest word in the English language published in a popular dictionary, Oxford Dictionaries, which defines it as "an artificial long word said to mean a lung disease caused by inhaling very fine ash and sand dust".

Clinical and toxicological research conducted on volcanic crystalline silica has found little to no evidence of its ability to cause silicosis/pneumoconiosis-like diseases and geochemical analyses have shown that there are inherent factors in the crystalline structure which may render volcanic crystalline silica much less pathogenic than some other forms of crystalline silica.

== Etymology and history ==
Pneumonoultramicroscopicsilicovolcanoconiosis can be analysed as follows:

1. Pneumono: from ancient Greek (πνεύμων, pneúmōn) which means lungs
2. ultra: from Latin, meaning beyond
3. micro and scopic: from ancient Greek, meaning small looking, referring to the fineness of particulates
4. silico-: from Latin, silicon
5. volcano: from Latin, referring to volcano
6. coni: from ancient Greek (κόνις, kónis) which means dust
7. -osis: from ancient Greek, suffix to indicate a medical condition

This word was invented at a meeting of the National Puzzlers' League (NPL) by its president, Everett M. Smith. The word featured in an article published by the New York Herald Tribune on February 23, 1935, titled "Puzzlers Open 103rd Session Here by Recognizing 45-Letter Word":

Pneumonoultramicroscopicsilicovolcanoconiosis succeeded electrophotomicrographically as the longest word in the English language recognized by the National Puzzlers' League at the opening session of the organization's 103rd semi-annual meeting held yesterday at the Hotel New Yorker. The puzzlers explained that the forty-five-letter word is the synonym of a special form of pneumoconiosis caused by ultra-microscopic particles of silica volcanic dust...

— New York Herald Tribune in reference

Although it has been defined as an extension of pneumoconiosis, there is no scientific evidence for a similar disease related to volcanic silica particle exposures. The word was used in Frank Scully's puzzle book Bedside Manna, after which time, members of the NPL campaigned to include the word in major dictionaries. The word, referred to as p45, first appeared in the 1939 supplement to the Merriam-Webster New International Dictionary, Second Edition.

Any references to pneumonoultramicroscopicsilicovolcanoconiosis or silicosis being caused by "sharp particles [which] lacerate lining of lungs; causing victim to leak air from their lungs while simultaneously bleeding into their lung cavity" are inaccurate. Particles of a size able to enter the lung (< 10 μm diameter) gently settle on the lung lining rather than cutting or abrading the surface.

== See also ==
- Antidisestablishmentarianism
- Coalworker's pneumoconiosis
- Floccinaucinihilipilification
- Health hazards of vog
- Hippopotomonstrosesquipedaliophobia
- Honorificabilitudinitatibus
- List of long place names
- Llanfairpwllgwyngyllgogerychwyrndrobwllllantisiliogogogoch
- Longest words
- Longest word in English
- Pseudopseudohypoparathyroidism
- Supercalifragilisticexpialidocious
