= Honorificabilitudinitatibus =

Latin word

The word as it appears in the first surviving edition of Shakespeare's Love's Labour's Lost (third line)

Honorificabilitudinitatibus (honōrificābilitūdinitātibus, Latin pronunciation: [hɔnoːrɪfɪkaːbɪlɪtuːdɪnɪˈtaːtɪbʊs]) is the dative and ablative plural of the medieval Latin word honōrificābilitūdinitās, which can be translated as "the state of being able to achieve honours". It is mentioned by the character Costard in Act V, Scene I (Note: The scene in which honorificabilitudinitatibus appears varies from publication to publication.) of William Shakespeare's Love's Labour's Lost.

As it appears only once in Shakespeare's works, it is a hapax legomenon in the Shakespeare canon. At 27 letters, it is the longest word in the English language to strictly alternate between consonants and vowels.

== Use in Love's Labour's Lost ==
The word is spoken by the comic rustic Costard in Act V, Scene 1 of the play. It is used after an absurdly pretentious dialogue between the pedantic schoolmaster Holofernes and his friend Sir Nathaniel. The two pedants converse in a mixture of Latin and florid English. When Moth, a witty young servant, enters, Costard says of the pedants:

O, they have lived long on the alms-basket of words, I marvel thy master hath not eaten thee for a word; for thou art not so long by the head as honorificabilitudinitatibus: thou art easier swallowed than a flap-dragon.

== Use in Baconianism ==
The word has been used by adherents of the Baconian theory who believe Shakespeare's plays were written in steganographic cypher by Francis Bacon. In 1905 Isaac Hull Platt argued that it was an anagram for hi ludi, F. Baconis nati, tuiti orbi, Latin for "these plays, F. Bacon's offspring, are preserved for the world". His argument was given wide circulation by Edwin Durning-Lawrence in 1910, complete with a cryptonumerical attempt to prove it justified. The anagram assumes that Bacon would have Latinized his name as "Baco" or "Bacon" (the genitive case of which is "Baconis") rather than, as Samuel Schoenbaum argues, "Baconus", with genitive "Baconi".

It is far from the only possible anagram. In 1898, Paget Toynbee noted that the word contains a glorification of Dante by himself as its letters could be rearranged to form the phrase Ubi Italicus ibi Danti honor fit (Where there is an Italian, there honour is paid to Dante). In the 1970s, John Sladek noted that the word could also be anagrammatized as I, B. Ionsonii, uurit [writ] a lift'd batch, thus "proving" that Shakespeare's works were written by Ben Jonson. (Note: The two "u"s, rendered as "v"s in the original literation, are put together to form—literally—"a double u" (w), as was common practice in Shakespeare's day.) In 2012, in a column for the Calcutta Telegraph, Stephen Hugh-Jones mocked it with the deliberately anachronistic "If I built it in, is author ID Bacon?", attributing this to a derisive William Shakespeare; and counter-"proved" that Shakespeare wrote Bacon by converting the latter's famous opening phrase "What is truth, said jesting Pilate..." into "Truth? A lasting jape. Hide it. WS".

== Other uses ==
Long before Love's Labour's Lost, the word and its variants had been used by medieval and then Renaissance authors.

=== Medieval ===
The unusually long word had apparently already been in circulation among scholars by the time of Petrus Grammaticus, 8th-century Italian poet, deacon, grammarian, and Charlemagne's primary Latin teacher. It can be found in Codex Bernensis 522 (Burgerbibliothek of Berne, Cod. 522), an early-9th-century manuscript copy of his work.

Italian lexicographer Papias used it circa 1055.

Honorificabilitudo appears in a charter of 1187 by Ugone della Volta, second Archbishop of Genoa.

Various forms of the word were also discussed in Magnae Derivationes, an early etymological treatise of circa 1190 by Uguccione, Italian canon lawyer and Bishop of Ferrara:

Ab honorifico, hic et hec honorificabilis, -le, et hec honorificabilitas, -tis et hec honorificabilitudinitas, et est longissima dictio, que illo versu continetur: Fulget honorificabilitudinitatibus iste. (Note: Although Uguccione's book survives in multiple manuscripts, it has never been printed—as discussed in Toynbee, 1902, p. 98 (text and fn. 3), p. 99 (fn. 5), p. 101 (fn. 6), or, more recently, in Sharpe, 1996, p. 103.)

It also appears in Ars poetica, treatise on rhetoric of circa 1208–1216 by English-born French scholar Gervase of Melkley:

Quidam, admirantes huiusmodi magna dictiones, inutiliter et turpissime versum clauserunt sub duobus dictionibus vel tribus. Unde quidam ait: Versificabantur Constantinopolitani; alius: Plenus honorificabilitudinitatibus esto.

Johannes Balbus, 1286, Catholicon (printed edition of 1460 by Johannes Gutenberg)

Italian grammarian Johannes Balbus used the word in its complete form in his hugely popular 1286 Latin dictionary known as Catholicon (in 1460, it became one of the first books to be printed using Gutenberg's press). Quoting Uguccione, it says regarding honorifico:

Unde haec honorificabilitudinitatibus et haec est longissimo dictu ut patet in hoc versu, Fulget honorificabilitudinitatibus iste.

A late-13th-century example can be found in an anonymous sermon in a manuscript in Bodleian Library (MS Bodl. 36, f. 131v).

In his linguistic essay De vulgari eloquentia (On eloquence in the vernacular) of circa 1302–1305 Dante, drawing on Uguccione's Magnae Derivationes, cites honorificabilitudinitate as an example of a word too long for the standard line in verse:

Posset adhuc inveniri plurium sillabarum vocabulum sive verbum, sed quia capacitatem omnium nostrorum carminum superexcedit, rationi presenti non videtur obnoxium, sicut est illud honorificabilitudinitate, quod duodena perficitur sillaba in vulgari et in gramatica tredena perficitur in duobus obliquis.

Honorificabilitudinitas occurs in De gestis Henrici septimi Cesaris (1313–1315), a book by the Italian poet Albertino Mussato which chronicled 1310–1313 Italian expedition of Henry VII, Holy Roman Emperor:

Nam et maturius cum Rex prima Italiæ ostia contigisset, legatos illo Dux ipse direxerat cum regalibus exeniis Honorificabilitudinitatis nec obsequentiæ ullius causa, quibus etiam inhibitum pedes osculari regios.

It was for this work that in 1315 the commune of Padua crowned Mussato as poet laureate; he was the first man to receive the honour since antiquity.

It is also found on an Exchequer record, in a hand of the reign of Henry VI (1422–1461).

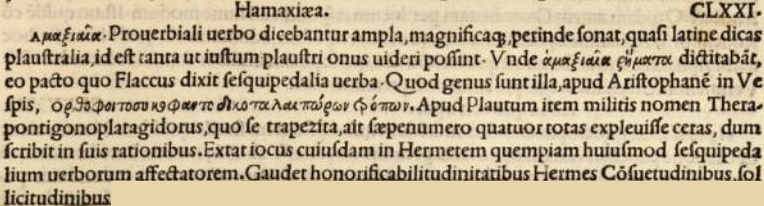
An entry in Desiderius Erasmus's compendium Adagia, a possible source for Shakespeare

The word appears in Adagia, an annotated collection of Greek and Latin proverbs, compiled by Dutch humanist Erasmus; he recalls a humorous couplet about a man called Hermes who was fond of using foot-and-a-half words:

Hamaxiaea: Extat jocus cujusdam in Hermetem quempiam hujuscemodi sesquipedalium verborum affectatorem:
Gaudet honorificabilitudinitatibus Hermes
Consuetudinibus, sollicitudinibus.

First published in 1500, by Shakespeare's time it was a very popular book, widely used as a text-book in English schools. The couplet itself was a popular schoolboy joke, current both in Erasmus's and Shakespeare's times, and beyond.

In the foreword to his 1529 translation of Lucan, French humanist and engraver Geoffroy Tory used the word as an example of bad writing, citing the Hermes couplet.

It also occurs in the works of Rabelais and in The Complaynt of Scotland (1549).

The word in its various forms was frequently used as test of the pen by scribes. One example is found in a fourteenth-century Pavian codex. It may also be seen, with some additional syllables, scribbled on a page of a late-16th-century heraldic manuscript (British Library, MS Harley 6113). Alternative form in honorificabilitudinacionibus is attested from manuscripts in Bamberg (Bamberg State Library, Q.V.41) and Munich (Bavarian State Library, Cgm 541). Other examples include Erfurt O.23, Prague 211 (f. 255v), Bratislava II Q.64 (f. 27r), Pembroke 260 (flyleaf), and a manuscript of Hoccleve.

The word is also known from at least two inscriptions on medieval tableware. A small goblet inscribed with honorificabilitudinitatibus around it was found at Kirby Muxloe Castle in Leicestershire, England. A pewter cruet engraved with an abbreviated version of the word (honorificabiliut) next to the owner's name (Thomas Hunte) was unearthed in a well filled in 1476 during 1937 conservation works at Ashby de la Zouch Castle, also in Leicestershire. The cruet was cast around 1400 and is currently in Victoria and Albert Museum, London.

=== Modern ===
==== Shakespeare's times ====
The year after the publication of Love's Labours Lost it is used by English satirist Thomas Nashe in his 1599 pamphlet Nashe's Lenten Stuff:

Physicians deafen our ears with the honorificabilitudinitatibus of their heavenly panacaea, their sovereign guiacum.

Nashe is referring to the exotic medicinal plant Guaiacum, the name of which was also exotic to the English at that time, being the first Native American word imported into the English language.

The word also appears in John Marston's 1605 play The Dutch Courtesan, Act V, Scene II:

For grief's sake keep him out; his discourse is like the long word Honorificabilitudinitatibus, a great deal of sound and no sense.

In John Fletcher's tragicomedy The Mad Lover of c. 1617 the word is used by the palace fool

The Iron age return'd to Erebus,
And Honorificabilitudinitatibus
Thrust out o'th' Kingdom by the head and shoulders.

Most Honorificicabilitudinitatibus, I having studied the seven Lub berly sciences (being nine by computation) out of which I gathered three conjunctions four muile Ass-under, which with much labour, and great ease, to little or no purpose, I have noddicated to your gray, grave, and gravelled Prate ection?.

==== After Shakespeare ====
Following the tradition of medieval scholars, Charles du Cange included both honorificabilitudo and honorificabilitudinitatibus in his 1678 Latin lexicon Glossarium mediae et infimae Latinitatis, quoting Ugone della Volta and Albertino Mussato.

Thomas Blount listed the anglicized form of the word, honorificabilitudinity (defined as "honorableness"), among the 11,000 hard or unusual words in his 1656 Glossographia, the largest English dictionary at the time. The entry was quoted by Elisha Coles in An English Dictionary, published in 1676. It was also repeated by Nathan Bailey in his influential 1721 An Universal Etymological English Dictionary.

While honorificabilitudinitatibus was not included in Samuel Johnson's famous dictionary, Dr Johnson did comment on its length in his 1765 edition of The Plays of William Shakespeare:

This word, whencesoever it comes, is often mentioned as the longest word known.

Commenting on this, antiquarian Joseph Hunter wrote in 1845:

This Dr. Johnson calls a word, and says that "it is the longest word known." This is a very extraordinary hallucination of a mind so accustomed to definition as his was, and so apt to form definitions eminently just and proper. Word, when properly understood, belongs only to a combination of letters that is significative; but this is a mere arbitrary and unmeaning combination of syllables, and devised merely to serve as an exercise in penmanship, a schoolmaster's copy for persons learning to write.

In 1858, Charles Dickens wrote an essay Calling Bad Names for the weekly magazine Household Words he edited at the time; it starts with the Love's Labour's Lost quote and uses it to satirize the scientific publications that use too many Latin words:

He who by the seashore makes friends with the sea-nettles, is introduced to them by the scientific master of ceremonies as the Physsophoridae and Hippopodydae. Creatures weak, delicate and beautiful, are Desmidiaceae, Chaetopterina, and Amphinomaceae, Tenthredineta, Twentysyllableorfeeta, and all for the honour of science; or rather, not for its honour; but for it honorificabilitudinitatibus.

James Joyce also used this word in his mammoth 1922 novel Ulysses, during the Scylla and Charybdis episode; when Stephen Dedalus articulates his interpretation of Hamlet:

Like John o'Gaunt his name is dear to him, as dear as the coat and crest he toadied for, on a bend sable a spear or steeled argent, honorificabilitudinitatibus, dearer than his glory of greatest shakescene in the country.

In 1993 U.S. News & World Report used the word in its original meaning with reference to a debate about new words being used in the game of Scrabble:

Honorificabilitudinity and the requirements of Scrabble fans dictated that the New Shorter Oxford English Dictionary's makers be open-minded enough to include dweeb (a boringly conventional person), droob (an unprepossessing or contemptible person, esp. a man), and droog (a member of a gang: a young ruffian). (Note: The word contains more letters than a line on a Scrabble board can accommodate.)

== See also ==
- Antidisestablishmentarianism
- Floccinaucinihilipilification
- Longest word in English
- Longest words
- Pneumonoultramicroscopicsilicovolcanoconiosis
- Pseudopseudohypoparathyroidism
- Supercalifragilisticexpialidocious

== General and cited references ==
- Nathan Bailey (1721). An Universal Etymological English Dictionary. 1726 edition.
- Brian C. Ballentine (2010). How to Do Things with Hard Words: The Uses of Classical Borrowings in the English Renaissance. Doctoral thesis, Brown University.
- Basch, David (2007). "Shakespearean Prayer". The Jewish Magazine.
- Ludwig Bertalot (1917). De Vulgari Eloquentia, Libri II. Frankfurt a.M., Friedrichsdorf.
- Thomas Blount (1656). Glossographia. 1972 facsimile edition.
- Karl Borinski (1896). "Dante und Shakespeare". Anglia (18): 450–454.
- Karl Borinski (1897). "Noch Einmal von Honorificabilitudinitatibus". Anglia (19): 135–136.
- Elisha Coles (1676). An English Dictionary: Explaining the Difficult Terms that are used in Divinity, Husbandry, Physick, Phylosophy, Law, Navigation, Mathematicks, and Other Arts and Sciences. 1973 facsimile edition.
- Carmine Di Biase (2006). Travel and Translation in the Early Modern Period. Amsterdam: Rodopi. ISBN 9789042017689.
- Charles Dickens (1858). "Calling Bad Names", in Household Words, volume 18.
- Charles du Fresne, sieur du Cange (1678). Glossarium mediae et infimae Latinitatis. 1883–1887 edition (searchable version).
- Douglas Hamer (1971). "Review of: Shakespeare's Lives. By S. Schoenbaum". The Review of English Studies. 22 (88): 482–485. doi:10.1093/res/XXII.88.482.
- Charles Hindley (1872). Works of John Taylor, the Water-poet. London: Reeves and Turner.
- Joseph Hunter (1845). New illustrations of the life, studies, and writings of Shakespeare.
- James Hutton (1931). "Honorificabilitudinitatibus". Modern Language Notes. 46 (6): 392–395. doi:10.2307/2913094. JSTOR 2913094.
- William M. Ivans Jr. (1920). "Geoffroy Tory". The Metropolitan Museum of Art Bulletin. 15 (4): 79–86. doi:10.2307/3253359. JSTOR 3253359.
- Montague Rhodes James (1905). A Descriptive Catalogue of the Manuscripts in the Library of Pembroke College, Cambridge. Cambridge University Press.
- Samuel Johnson (1755). A Dictionary of the English Language. 1785 edition.
- Samuel Johnson, George Steevens (1765). The Plays of William Shakespeare. 1801 edition.
- James Joyce (1922). Ulysses. online.
- Hans Küsswetter (1906). Beiträge zur Shakespeare-Bacon-Frage. Borna, Leipzig, Buchdruckerei R. Noske.
- Leslie, Deborah J.; Griffin, Benjamin (2003). Transcription of Early Letter Forms in Rare Materials Cataloging (PDF). DCRM Conference, 10-13 March 2003. Archived from the original (PDF) on May 20, 2011.
- Falconer Madan, Edmund Craster (1922). A summary catalogue of Western manuscripts in the Bodleian Library at Oxford. Volume II, part 1.
- R. A. B. Mynors (1982). Collected Works of Erasmus. Volume 34: Adages II.VII.1 to III.III.100. University of Toronto Press. ISBN 9780802028310.
- Giovanni Nencioni^{(it)} (1967). "Dante e la Retorica", in Dante e Bologna nei tempi di Dante.
- Notes and Queries (1881). Series 6, volume IV.
- Nicholas Royle (2010). "The distraction of 'Freud': Literature, Psychoanalysis and the Bacon-Shakespeare Controversy", in Shakespeare and His Authors: Critical Perspectives on the Authorship Question.
- Richard Sharpe (1996). "Vocabulary, Word Formation, and Lexicography", in: F. A. C. Mantello and A. G. Rigg (editors), Medieval Latin: An Introduction and Bibliographical Guide. Washington, D.C.: CUA Press. ISBN 9780813208428.
- R. S. Simms (1938). "Pewter Vessel from Ashby-de-la-Zouch Castle". The Antiquaries Journal. 18 (2): 178–180. doi:10.1017/S0003581500094518. S2CID 163890123.
- Sladek, John (1974). The New Apocrypha: A Guide to Strange Sciences and Occult Beliefs. New York: Stein and Day. ISBN 9780812817126.
- Geoffroy Tory (1529). La Table de l'ancien philosophe Cebes. Scans online at Bavarian State Library.
- Paget Toynbee (1902). Dante studies and researches. London: Methuen.
- Ludwig Traube (1909). Vorlesungen und abhandlungen. München, Beck.
- Alfred Horatio Upham (1908). The French Influence in English Literature from the Accession of Elizabeth to the Restoration. New York City: Columbia University Press.
- Andreas Venzke [in German] (2000). Johannes Gutenberg – Der Erfinder des Buchdrucks und seine Zeit. Munich: Piper Verlag. ISBN 978-3492229210.
- Henry William Weber (1812). The Works of Beaumont and Fletcher, volume 4.
- Rosemary Weinstein (2011). The Archaeology of Pewter Vessels in England 1200-1700: A Study of Form and Usage. Doctoral thesis, Durham University.
