= Costard =

Character in Love's Labour's Lost

- Love's Labour's Lost character
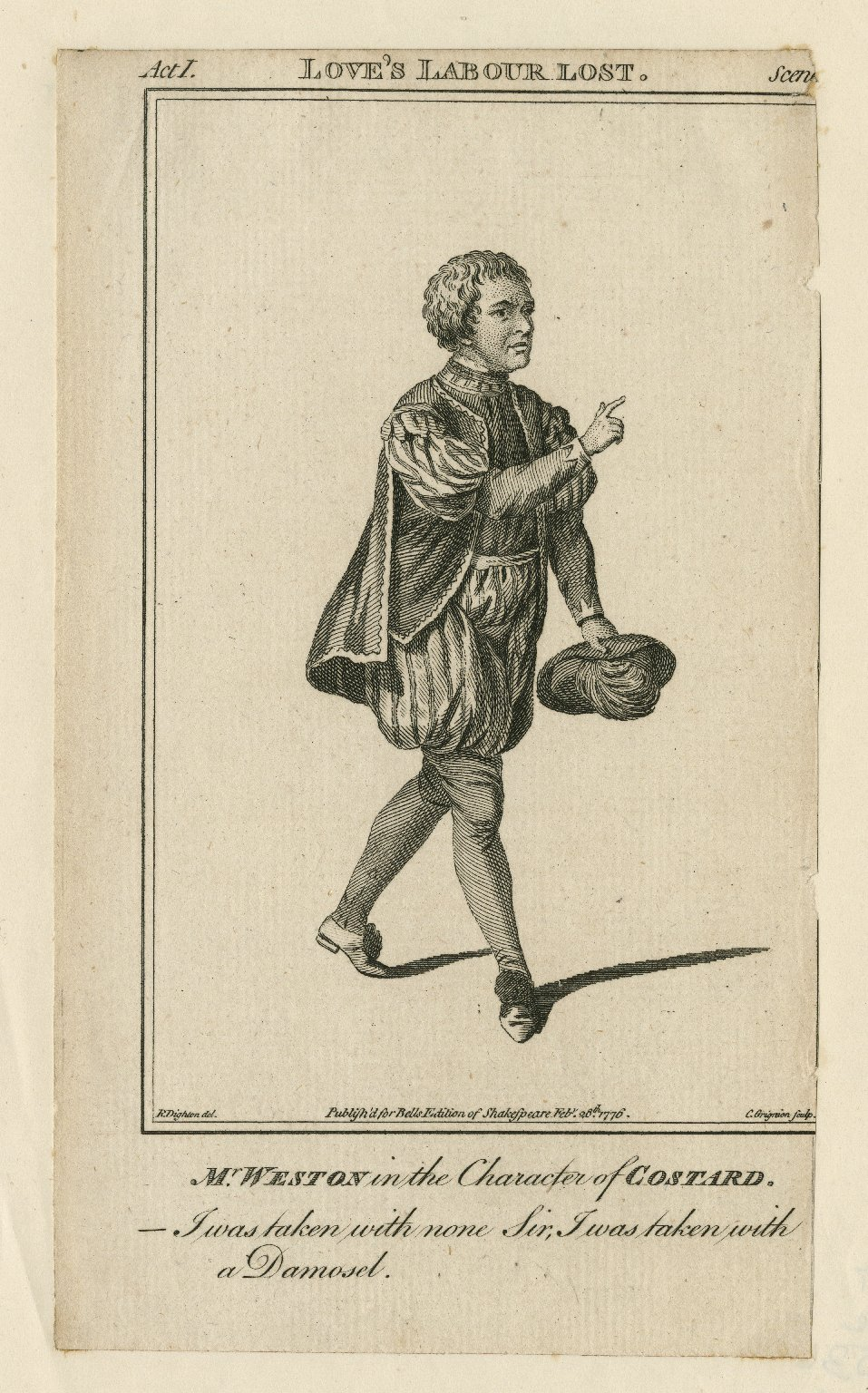
- 1776 print by Charles Grignion of Thomas Weston playing Costard
- Created by: William Shakespeare
- Portrayed by: Thomas Weston; Paul Jesson; Nathan Lane

In-universe information
- Gender: Male
- Occupation: Jester

Quote by Costard from the 1598 quarto using the word honorificabilitudinitatibus; his name is given as "Clow[n]."

Costard is a comic figure in the play Love's Labour's Lost by William Shakespeare. A country bumpkin, he is arrested in the first scene for flouting the king's proclamation that all men of the court avoid the company of women for three years. While in custody, the men of the court use him to further their own romantic endeavors. By sending love notes to the wrong women and blurting out secrets (including that of an unplanned pregnancy), Costard makes fools of the royal court. Along with Moth the page and Jaquenetta, a country wench, Costard pokes fun at the upper-class. While mocking a pedantic schoolmaster, Costard uses the word honorificabilitudinitatibus, the longest word by far from any of Shakespeare's works.

Costard makes many clever puns, and is used as a tool by Shakespeare to explain new words such as remuneration. He is sometimes considered one of the smartest characters in the play due to his wit and wordplay.

Costard's name is an archaic term for apple, or metaphorically a man's head. Shakespeare uses the word in this sense in Richard III.
