= Kōauau =

Flute of the Māori people of New Zealand

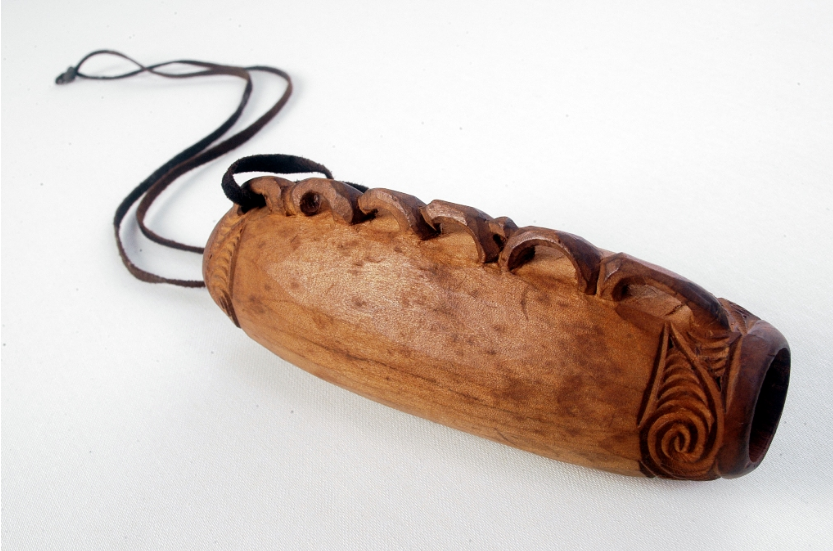
Kōauau from Museo Azzarini, Argentina

A kōauau is a small flute, ductless and notchless, 4 to 8 inches (10 to 20 cm) long, open at both ends and having from three to six fingerholes placed along the pipe.

Kōauau resemble flutes the world over both in tone quality and in the range of sounds that can be produced by directing the breath across the sharp edge of the upper aperture. Māori kōauau players were renowned for the power it gave them over the affections of women (notably illustrated by the story of Tūtānekai, who, by playing his kōauau, convinced Hinemoa to swim to him across Lake Rotorua). Kōauau are made of wood or bone. Formerly the bone was of bird bone such as albatross or moa; some instruments were also of human bone and were associated with chiefly status and with the cultural practice of utu. The instrument is associated with romantic rituals across New Zealand villages.

The flute also features in the longest place name in an English speaking country, Taumatawhakatangihangakoauauotamateaturipukakapikimaungahoronukupokaiwhenuakitanatahu translates roughly as "the summit where Tamatea, the man with the big knees, the slider, climber of mountains, the land-swallower who travelled about, played his kōauau (flute) to his loved one".
