= Frank Brookhouser =

American journalist

Frank Brookhouser

Frank O. Brookhouser (1912–1975) was an American journalist and writer.

Brookhouser began his career in journalism as an editor (1932–1935) for his hometown paper, the Ford City News. He became sports editor (1935–1936) at the Monongahela Daily Republican in Monongahela, Pennsylvania, then landed a beat reporting job in Philadelphia in 1936 at the Philadelphia Evening Bulletin. The Philadelphia Inquirer hired him in 1939, where he became a popular columnist. He moved his column, "A Man about Town", back to the Philadelphia Evening Bulletin in 1953 for the remainder of his journalism career. In the 1950s he also had a weekly television show and a daily evening radio show.

Brookhouser's columns were re-edited into his book portrait of Philadelphia, Our Philadelphia, the first sentence of which pays tribute to typesetters Hubert Blaine Wolfeschlegelsteinhausenbergerdorff and Benjamin Franklin as exemplar Philadelphians. While writing "A Man about Town", Brookhouser had previously attracted national attention by omitting the letter "u" (and being promptly corrected) in reporting Wolfeschlegelsteinhausenbergerdorff's 1952 voter registration under the 35-letter surname.

As well as journalism, Brookhouser published hundreds of short stories and one novel.

He was born to Walter L. and Miriam Fischer Brookhouser in Ford City, Pennsylvania. He graduated from Ford City High School and Temple University in Philadelphia where he was a member of Sigma Pi fraternity. In 1939 he married Helen E. Hanway. He served in the U. S. Army for three years during World War II.

== Works ==
- Request for Sherwood Anderson, short stories (Denver: Alan Swallow, 1947)
- She Made the Big Town, short stories (New York: Twayne Publishers, 1952)
- Now I Lay Me Down, novel (Denver: Alan Swallow, 1955)
- Our Philadelphia: A Candid and Colorful Portrait of a Great City, newspaper columns (Garden City: Doubleday, 1957)
- These Were Our Years, anthology (Garden City: Doubleday, 1959)
- This Was Your War, anthology (Garden City: Doubleday, 1960)
