= Lopadotemachoselachogaleokranioleipsanodrimhypotrimmatosilphiokarabomelitokatakechymenokichlepikossyphophattoperisteralektryonoptekephalliokigklopeleiolagoiosiraiobaphetraganopterygon =

Fictional dish

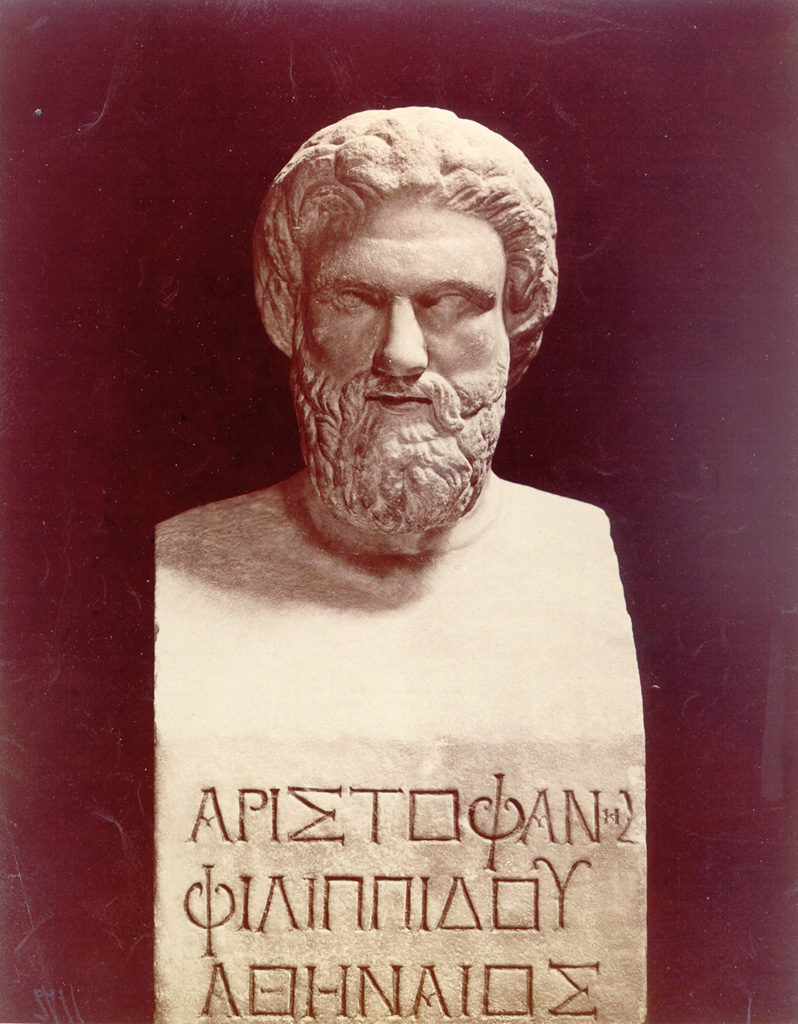
Bust of Aristophanes in the Uffizi Gallery, Florence, Italy

Lopadotemachoselachogaleokranioleipsanodrimhypotrimmatosilphiokarabomelitokatakechymenokichlepikossyphophattoperisteralektryonoptekephalliokigklopeleiolagoiosiraiobaphetraganopterygon is a fictional dish originating from Aristophanes' 391 BC comedy Assemblywomen, deriving from a transliteration of the Ancient Greek word λοπαδοτεμαχοσελαχογαλεοκρανιολειψανοδριμυποτριμματοσιλφιοκαραβομελιτοκατακεχυμενοκιχλεπικοσσυφοφαττοπεριστεραλεκτρυονοπτοκεφαλλιοκιγκλοπελειολαγῳοσιραιοβαφητραγανοπτερύγων. In A Greek–English Lexicon, it is defined as the "name of a dish compounded of all kinds of dainties, fish, flesh, fowl, and sauces".

It is the longest Greek word, containing 171 letters and 78 syllables. The transliteration has 183 Latin characters and is the longest word ever to appear in literature, according to the Guinness World Records (1990).

== Variant forms ==
The form of the word quoted here is the version listed in the Liddell & Scott Greek lexicon (1940) and quoted therein as being amended by August Meineke, contrasting F.W. Hall and W.M. Geldart's 1907 edition of Aristophanis Comoediae (used in the Assemblywomen play) variant of (differences underlined):
λοπαδοτεμαχοσελαχογαλεοκρανιολειψανοδριμυποτριμματοσιλφιοτυρομελιτοκατακεχυμενοκιχλεπικοσσυφοφαττοπεριστεραλεκτρυονοπτεκεφαλλιοκιγκλοπελειολαγῳοσιραιοβαφητραγανοπτερυγώ.

== Description ==
The dish was a fricassée, with at least 16 sweet and sour ingredients, including the following:

- Fish slices
- Fish of the Elasmobranchii subclass (a shark or ray)
- Rotted dogfish or small shark's head
- A generally sharp-tasting dish of several ingredients grated and pounded together
- Silphion, possibly a kind of giant fennel, now believed extinct
- A kind of crab, shrimp, or crayfish
- Honey poured down
- Wrasse (or thrush)
- A kind of sea fish or blackbird as topping
- Wood pigeon
- Domestic pigeon
- Rooster
- The roasted head of dabchick
- Hare, which could be a kind of bird or a kind of sea hare
- New wine boiled down
- Wing and/or fin

== Context ==
The term is used in the ultimate chorus of the play, when Blepyrus (and the audience) are summoned to the first feast laid on by the new system.

[1167] And you others, let your light steps too keep time.
[1168] Very soon we'll be eating
[1170] lopadotemachoselachogaleokranioleipsanodrimypotrimmatosilphiokarabomelitokatakechymenokichlepikossyphophattoperisteralektryonoptekephaliokigklopeleiolagoiosiraiobaphetraganopterygon [sic].
[1175] Come, quickly, seize hold of a plate, snatch up a cup, and let's run to secure a place at table. The rest will have their jaws at work by this time.

— translation ed. Eugene O'Neill, 1938

== English translations ==
In English prose translation by Leo Strauss (1966), this Greek word is rendered as "oysters-saltfish-skate-sharks'-heads-left-over-vinegar-dressing-laserpitium-leek-with-honey-sauce-thrush-blackbird-pigeon-dove-roast-cock's-brains-wagtail-cushat-hare-stewed-in-new-wine-gristle-of-veal-pullet's-wings".

English verse translation by Benjamin Bickley Rogers (1902) follows the original meter and the original form of composition:

Plattero-filleto-mulleto-turboto-
-Cranio-morselo-pickleo-acido-
-Silphio-honeyo-pouredonthe-topothe-
-Ouzelo-throstleo-cushato-culvero-
-Cutleto-roastingo-marowo-dippero-
-Leveret-syrupu-gibleto-wings.

An older English verse translation by Rev. Rowland Smith (1833) breaks the original word into several verses:

Limpets, oysters, salt fish,
And a skate too a dish,
Lampreys, with the remains
Of sharp sauce and birds' brains,
With honey so luscious,
Plump blackbirds and thrushes,
Cocks' combs and ring doves,
Which each epicure loves,
Also wood-pigeons blue,
With juicy snipes too,
And to close all, O rare!
The wings of jugged hare!

== See also ==
- Longest word in English
- Hubert Blaine Wolfeschlegelsteinhausenbergerdorff Sr.
- Cneoridium dumosum (Nuttall) Hooker F. Collected March 26, 1960, at an Elevation of about 1450 Meters on Cerro Quemazón, 15 Miles South of Bahía de Los Angeles, Baja California, México, Apparently for a Southeastward Range Extension of Some 140 Miles
- List of longest names in Taiwan
