= Taumatawhakatangihangakoauauotamateaturipukakapikimaungahoronukupokaiwhenuakitanatahu =

Hill near Pōrangahau, New Zealand

- Taumata; Taumata Hill
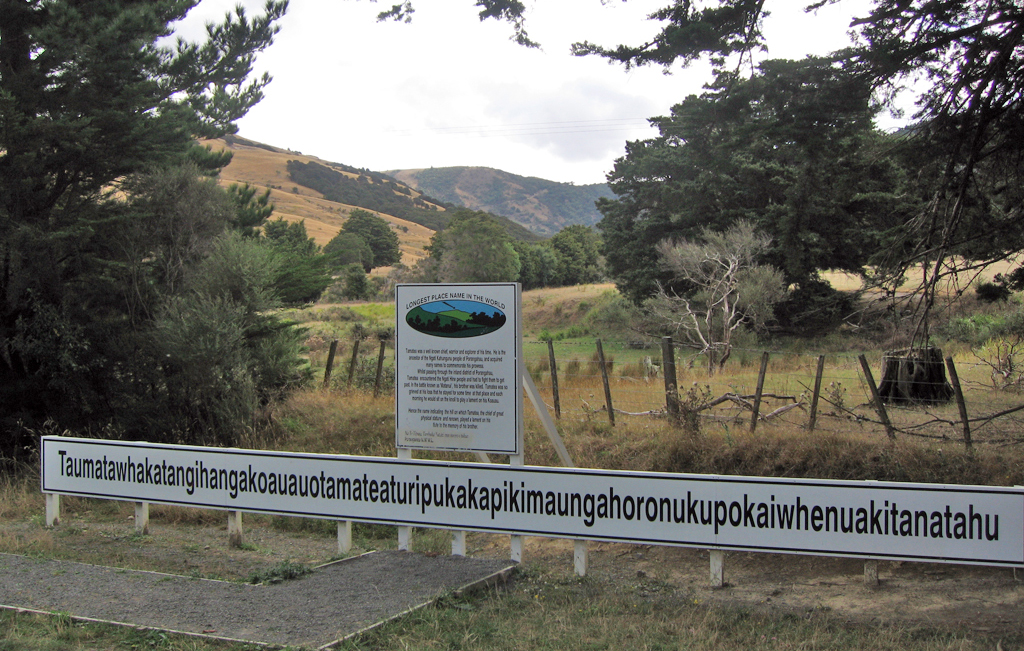
- Sign on Wimbledon Road, Pōrangahau, displaying the 85-character name. The summit of the hill is at centre in the far distance.

Highest point
- Elevation: 305 m (1,001 ft)
- Coordinates: 40.346°S 176.5402°E

Naming
- English translation: The summit where Tamatea, the man with the big knees, the slider, climber of mountains, the land-swallower who travelled about, played his kōauau (flute) to his loved one.
- Language of name: Māori

Geography
- Location: Near Pōrangahau, Hawke's Bay
- Country: New Zealand

Taumatawhakatangihangakoauauotamateaturipukakapikimaungahoronukupokaiwhenuakitanatahu (Note: Māori pronunciation: [taʉmataɸakataŋihaŋakoːaʉaʉɔtamatɛatʉɾipʉkakapikimaʉŋahɔɾɔnʉkʉpɔːkaiɸɛnʉakitaːnatahʉ]; This spelling is based on signs near the hill, two of which are shown in photographs in this article.) is a hill near Pōrangahau, south of Waipukurau, in southern Hawke's Bay, New Zealand. The summit of the hill is 305 metres (1,001 ft) above sea level. The hill is notable primarily for its unusually long name, which is of Māori origin; it is often shortened to Taumata and Taumata Hill for brevity. With a name that is 85 characters long, it has gained a measure of fame for having the longest place name found in any English-speaking country, and possibly the longest place name in the world, according to World Atlas and Guinness World Records. Other versions of the name, including longer ones, are also sometimes used.

== Name ==
The name Taumatawhakatangihangakoauauotamateaturipukakapikimaungahoronukupokaiwhenuakitanatahu translates roughly as "the summit where Tamatea, the man with the big knees, the slider, climber of mountains, the land-swallower who travelled about, played his kōauau (flute) to his loved one".

=== Other versions ===
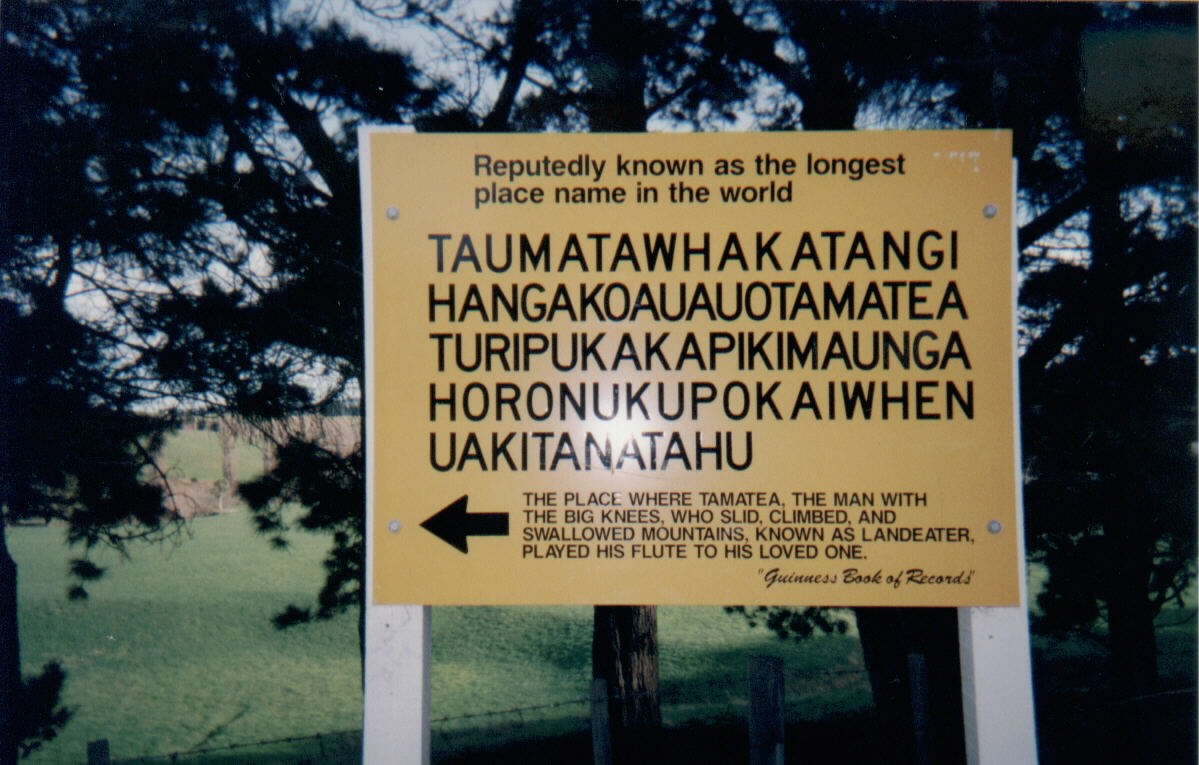
An older sign for the hill in 2013

The name has multiple alternative forms, some of them being longer still. Taumatawhakatangihangakoauauotamateaurehaeaturipukakapikimaungahoronukupokaiwhenuakitanatahu has 92 letters. An even longer version, Taumata-whakatangihanga-koauau-o-Tamatea-hau-mai-tawhiti-ure-haea-turi-pukaka-piki-maunga-horo-nuku-pokai-whenua-ki-tana-tahu, has 105 letters and means "the hill of the flute playing by Tamatea – who was blown hither from afar, had a slit penis, grazed his knees climbing mountains, fell on the earth, and encircled the land – to his beloved one".

Maps from 1929 published by the New Zealand Department of Lands and Survey use a 28-character name, Taumatawhakatangihangakoauau. In 1941, the Honorary Geographic Board of New Zealand renamed the hill to a 57-character name Taumatawhakatangihangakoauauotamateapokaiwhenuakitanatahu, which has been an official name since 1948, and first appeared in a 1955 map. The New Zealand Geographic Placenames Database, maintained by Land Information New Zealand (LINZ), shows the official name, with macrons, as Taumatawhakatangihangakōauauotamateapōkaiwhenuakitānatahu.

== Tamatea Urehaea ==
Location of Taumata

Tamatea-pōkai-whenua (Tamatea, the explorer of the land) was the father of Kahungunu, ancestor of the Ngāti Kahungunu tribe (iwi). Mention of Tamatea's explorations of the land occur not only in Ngāti Kahungunu legends, but also in the traditions of iwi from Northland, where he is said to have explored the Hokianga and Kaipara harbours.

In traditions from the Bay of Plenty Region, he left a son, Ranginui, who is the ancestor of Ngāti Ranginui of Tauranga. Legends from the East Coast of the North Island tell of his explorations in Ahuriri, Heretaunga, Māhia, Pōrangahau, Tūranga-nui and Wairoa. He travelled via the Mangakopikopiko River, over the Tītī-o-kura saddle via Pohokura to Lake Taupō. The Ōtamatea River is named after him. Tamatea is also the name of a suburb of Napier.

Early South Island legends say that Tamatea sailed down the east coast. His canoe was wrecked in the far south, and transformed into the Tākitimu mountain range. Tamatea then returned to the North Island, and travelled via the Whanganui River.

== In popular culture ==
The name is referenced in various works:

- The name is the subject of a 1960 song by the New Zealand balladeer Peter Cape.
- It features in the 1979 hit single by Quantum Jump, 'The Lone Ranger' where it sets the song's rhythmic tone. "Taumata-whaka-tangi-hanga-kuayuwo-tamate-aturi-pukaku-piki-maunga horonuku-pokaiawhen-uaka-tana-tahu mataku-atanganu-akawa-miki-tora / Me Tonto Kimosabi / Me go and catchee badee / Find him by the shady water / Deep within Apache forest / Find him scalp him eat him up for breakfast"

== See also ==
- List of long place names
- Longest place names in English
