= William Harmon =

American poet (born 1938)

William Harmon (born 1938) is James Gordon Hanes Professor Emeritus in the Humanities at the University of North Carolina at Chapel Hill, author of five books of poetry, and editor of A Handbook to Literature from 1984 to 2011. His poetry has appeared in Blink, Poetry, AGNI, and Light.

== Life ==
William Harmon was born in Concord, North Carolina, a small cotton-mill town northeast of Charlotte. In 1954, at the age of sixteen, he entered the University of Chicago. He graduated in 1958. He was an officer on active duty with the United States Navy between 1960 and 1967, the last year of which was in Vietnam. As an adviser to the South Vietnamese Navy, he wrote its Standard Ship's Organization Manual. He continued as a Reserve officer until 1980, reaching the rank of lieutenant commander. After returning to the United States, he pursued post-graduate work (focused predominantly on trans-Atlantic modernist poetry) at the University of Chicago, where he earned his master's degree in 1968; the University of North Carolina at Chapel Hill, where he earned an additional master's the same year; and the University of Cincinnati, where he earned his doctorate in 1970. His dissertation on Ezra Pound was published by the University of North Carolina Press in 1977. In 1970, he was hired by UNC Chapel Hill, where he remained on the faculty until 2008, when he retired.

His first book of poetry, Treasury Holiday, was published in 1970 by Wesleyan University Press and became the Lamont Poetry Selection of the year. His most recent collection of poetry, Mutatis Mutandis: 27 Invoices, won the Poetry Society of America's William Carlos Williams Award in 1985.

Harmon has been donating an extensive set of correspondences (over 10,000 items, deemed the William Harmon Papers) to the Southern Historical Collection at Wilson Library (located in Chapel Hill, North Carolina). The letters document Harmon's discussions with a range of other poets, including A.R. Ammons, John Ashbery, Robert Bly, Robert Creeley, John Hollander, Richard Wilbur, and Robert Penn Warren.

== Works ==
Poetry

- Mutatis Mutandis: 27 Invoices (1985)
- One Long Poem (1982)
- The Intussusception of Miss Mary America (1976)
- Legion: Civic Choruses (1973)
- Treasury Holiday: Thirty-Four Fits for the Opening of the Fiscal Year (1970)

Edited Reference Works

- A Handbook to Literature (5th-12th eds., 1984-2011)
- Classic Writings on Poetry (2005)
- The Classic Hundred: All-Time Favorite Poems (2nd ed., 1998)
- The Top 500 Poems (1992)
- The Oxford book of American light verse (1979)

Literary Criticism

- Time in Ezra Pound's Work (1977)
- The Poetry Toolkit (2012)
