= Assemblywomen =

Comedy by Aristophanes

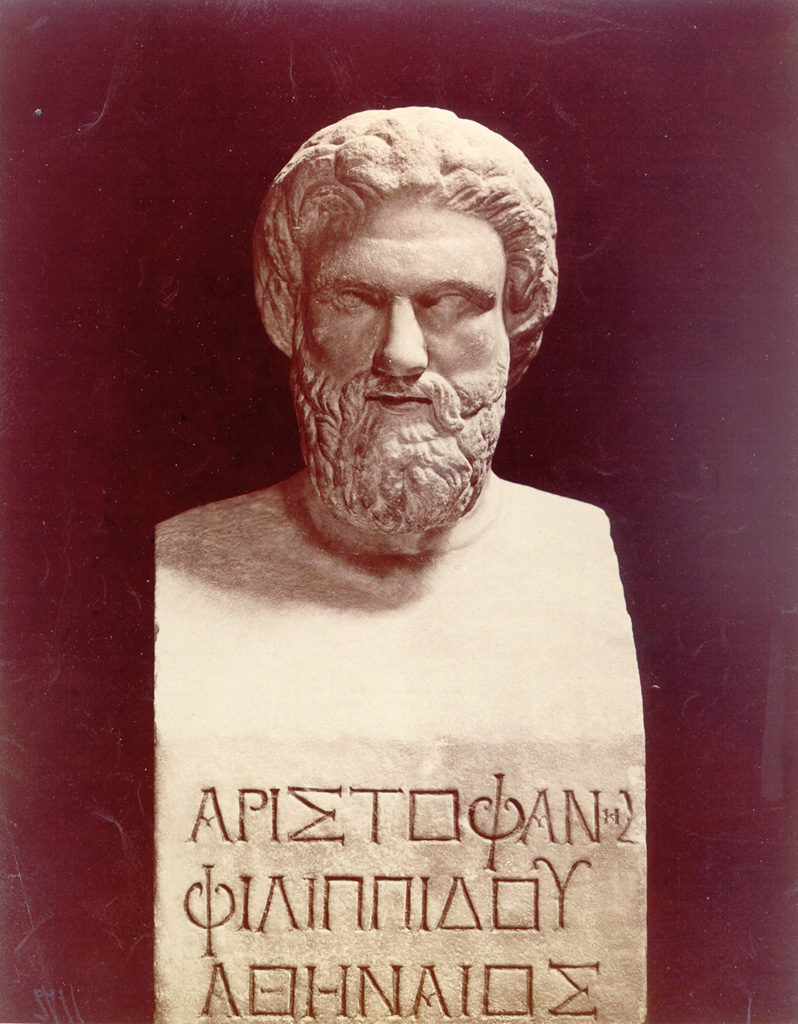
- Aristophanes
- Written by: Aristophanes
- Chorus: Athenian Women
- Setting: An Athenian street

Assemblywomen (Ancient Greek: Ἐκκλησιάζουσαι Ekklesiazousai; also translated as, Congresswomen, Women in Parliament, Women in Power, A Parliament of Women, Assembly-Women, and Women in the Assembly) is a comedy written by the Greek playwright Aristophanes in 391 BC. The play portrays a scenario where the women of Athens assume control of the government and institute totalitarian proto-communist reforms that ban private wealth and enforce sexual equity for the old and unattractive. In addition to Aristophanes' political and social satire, Assemblywomen derives its comedy through sexual and scatological humor. The play aimed to criticize the Athenian government's expropriation of land and wealth at the time.

== Historical background ==
In the early 4th century BC, Athens was reeling from the Peloponnesian War and remained in the midst of continuing battles with Sparta. Athens and its allies, Thebes, Corinth and Argos experienced over two years struggling to rid themselves of the Spartans with many successes and failures along the way. While Athens was in a position to regain naval authority in the Aegean Sea thanks to alliances forged with Persia and King Evagoras of Cyprus, the people of Athens were impoverished. For this reason, the poor favored war as it ensured future employment while the wealthy favored peace, as war required disbursements. Continuation of the Corinthian War inevitably led to increased confiscations and forced contributions from wealthy Athenians. This atmosphere resulted in a material and moral anxiety that was illustrated in the Athens represented by Aristophanes.

Aristotle claimed that the freedoms permitted to Spartan women in the days of Sparta's successful military campaigns had, by the fourth century BCE, led to Sparta's defeat by the Thebans. He observed that at this time, women under the Spartan constitution were not subject to the same restrictions as men, and therefore lived "luxurious lives," while the men remained in military training. As a result of this, the Spartan women at the time of the 369 BCE Theban invasion, were "utterly useless and caused more confusion than the enemy".

At this time, Spartan women were allowed to own property, but Athenian women were not. According to Plato, if Greek women ever had the opportunity to govern, it would have only been for a brief period of time, and only in the event of a specific problem or an emergency. One example could be in the event of a monarchy or tyranny happening related to a man being in charge.

== Plot ==
=== Characters ===
The dramatis personae based on Jeffrey Henderson's translation are:

- Praxagora: an Athenian Wife
- First Woman: a neighbor of Praxagora
- Second Woman: another neighbor of Praxagora
- Blepyrus: Praxagora's Husband
- Neighbor of Blepyrus
- Chremes
- Selfish Man
- Herald: a woman appointed by Praxagora
- First Old Woman
- Girl
- Epigenes: a young man
- Second Old Woman
- Third Old Woman
- Maid of Praxagora

Silent Characters

- Sicon and Parmenon: neighbor's slaves
- Two Girls

=== Setting ===
- An Athenian street

=== Story ===
The play begins with Praxagora emerging from a house on an Athenian street before daybreak. She is wearing a false beard and men's clothing, and she carries a walking stick and a lit lantern. The chorus of Athenian women enter one by one, all dressed in similar costume. In order to be more convincingly masculine, some women have developed tans and stopped shaving their armpits. One woman brings a basket full of yarn in order to get some work done as the assembly fills up, to which Praxagora chastises her for this decision as it will ruin their cover.

The women are wary of the plan and Praxagora attempts to rally them as they practise speaking as men before the assembly. Praxagora is frustrated by the women's inability to pretend to be men, as they swear to Demeter and Persephone rather than Apollo, address the assembled women as ladies, and complain about the discomfort of their disguises and their thirst. Praxagora decides that she alone is capable of speaking to the assembly and practices a speech decrying the corrupt leaders of the city as selfish and unpatriotic through their acts of war and personal enrichment through public funds. She proposes to the women that the men should turn over the Athenian government to the women, stating, "For I propose this law: that we put at once the city's entire rule in the women's hands. Do they not manage households efficiently?" She further explains that women are superior to men because they are harder workers, devoted to tradition and do not bother with useless innovations. She concludes that a women-led government will better protect the soldiers and feed them extra rations, as shrewd negotiators, they will secure more funds for the city. Praxagora impresses the women with her rhetorical skills, and explains that it was learned from listening to orators while living with her husband on the Pnyx, where the Athenian assembly was held. They discuss how they plan to handle opposition and practise how to raise their hands to vote before leaving to attend the assembly by dawn in order to receive pay and a complimentary meal. The chorus of women reiterate their intentions before exiting the stage.

Praxagora's husband Blepyrus emerges from their house wearing Praxagora's nightgown and slippers. He is old and desperately had to relieve himself but could not find his clothing in the dark. As he squats in the street lamenting his constipation, his neighbor arrives and both men realize that their wives and clothing are missing from their homes. Chremes, returning from the assembly, comes upon Blepyrus and his neighbor and explains that he was not paid because of the unprecedented turn-out of pale faced shoe-makers (referring to the women in disguise). He relayed the events of the assembly and Praxagora's speech. Believing she was a "good-looking young man," Chremes explains how he argued women were better at keeping secrets, returning borrowed items without cheating, that they don’t sue or inform on people or try to overthrow the democracy, all points that Blepyrus agreed upon. Now free of attending the assembly, the men are pleased to finally sleep in, but are not excited about having to provide sex to receive their breakfast.

The chorus enters, still in disguise and on their way home from the assembly, trying not to draw attention to themselves. Blepyrus accuses Praxagora of sneaking off with a lover when he finds her returning his cloak. She explains that she was only helping a friend in labor and had to wear his cloak for warmth. She feigns surprise when he explains to her the decision from the morning's assembly, but immediately begins listing the reasons the decision was wise. Praxagora then goes on to explain the details of the new government to Blepyrus. She proposes banning all ownership of private wealth and establishing equal pay for all and a unified standard of living. She further explains that people will no longer have a need for personal wealth as all basic needs will be met by the common fund. She further adds that men and women will be free to sleep with anyone they want, so long as they first sleep with the uglier and older members of the opposite sex. Parental responsibilities will be shared by the community as children will no longer know their fathers. Slaves will work the fields, but are now banned from having sex with free men, and prostitutes will be put out of business. Praxagora elaborates that there will be no more lawsuits, since there can be no debt in a society without private wealth. Punishments for assault will come out of the offender's bread ration and theft will be obsolete as all men will be given their fair share. Walls within homes will be knocked down and all will live in a common living space, courthouses and porticos will be turned into communal dining halls.

In the next scene, Blepyrus' neighbor is laying his household objects out in front of his house to be contributed to the common fund as the Selfish Man enters. The Selfish Man calls the neighbor a fool for following the new laws. He plans on waiting to see if everyone else gives up their property before he does it himself, citing failed decrees from the assembly in the past. The town Herald enters and announces a lavish feast for all to attend. The Selfish Man acts entitled to the feast, but the neighbor points out his reluctance to donate possessions to the common fund disqualifies him from communal events. After the neighbor leaves to donate his possessions, the Selfish Man explains that he intends to keep his belongings and enjoy the free dinner at the same time.

In a different scene, a young girl waits for her boyfriend Epigenes to arrive as an old woman is out looking for a date. They exchange vulgar insults and go inside their homes as Epigenes enters the scene, lamenting the new laws governing sex. He and the girl both speak of their desire for one another, but are interrupted by the old woman. Citing the new law, the old woman attempts to force Epigenes to sleep with her first. As the young girl and the old woman fight over the boy, two more old women enter and drag him away against his will.

In the final scene, a drunken maid enters praising Thasian wine and the new laws. She is looking to bring Blepyrus to dinner at Praxagora's request. She finds Blepyrus passing by, already on his way to dinner with two girls in his arms. They all go to dinner together while the chorus sings praise of the lavish feast they are about to have.

== Analysis ==
Even though the idea of a female-led government was a fantasy at the time, it was not unfamiliar to the people of Athens. The comic tradition of women in politics was in fact common, as seen through Aristophanes' plays Lysistrata and Thesmophoriazusae. The idea of women surpassing their Athenian social order is also seen in Sophocles’ tragedy Antigone.

According to Erich Segal, reading the play as a genuine exploration of female power is incorrect. It follows Aristophanes’ conflict structure of the republic in trouble, a solution suggested and that solution ultimately failing. Aristophanes’ plays mostly derive their narratives on absurd political and social innovations derived from the evolution of the state towards empowering effeminate men while displacing traditionally strong and masculine leadership. The ascent of women in political power in Assemblywomen is yet another commentary on what Aristophanes saw as the shameful effeminacy of the men currently in power in Athens. The fact that women in this instance could enter the assembly and successfully pass as men was a commentary on politicians being indistinguishable from women in costume.

Assemblywomen does not fall neatly within the confines of Old or New Comedy and is generally considered Middle Comedy. While the play follows the plot structure of earlier works by Aristophanes, the formal structure shows new developments, specifically in the function of the chorus. Though prominent in the first and last scenes of the play, the chorus’ lack of involvement throughout the central scenes is more similar to the style of Greek Tragedies. The play lacks a parabasis and has an undeveloped agon, the choral songs between episodes are not included in the script, and the lacuna is often indicated by the note choru ("place for a chorus"), which is more characteristic of Menander and New Comedy.

The law in Assemblywomen regarding personal property was a parody of what Athenians assumed was in the constitution of Sparta. Following the Athenian loss to Sparta, the Spartan system of government was looked at as a successful organization. In 392 BCE, when Assemblywomen would have been performed, it would have still been acceptable for Aristophanes to make fun of the notion that women could have equal rights to men. Later, Plato would realize that people might still take issue with the idea of women being educated. Regardless, he incorporated equality within education into the model for his Republic, as well as common marriages and children so that women would have the opportunity to be companions of men and co-guardians of his ideal state. However, even in Plato's idea of a utopia, he still portrayed women as weaker in nature and should be given lighter duties in wartime - though he did not specify what these lighter duties should be.

Assemblywomen is one of the earliest examples of cross-dressing in fiction.

=== Praxagora ===
As the leader of the assembly scheme, Praxagora holds a certain power and authority over the other women of Athens. The source of her power is derived from her shrewd intelligence. She presents herself as somewhat unwholesome by conspiring against the current political establishment. Praxagora is introspective and possesses many traits belonging to philosophers. She recognizes her own limits as a woman. She knows that not only are women not allowed to vote, but that they are also not allowed in public assembly where the democratic decisions are made. But, she is hardly resided to the civic powerlessness that women of ancient Greece were seemingly destined for.

== Longest word ==
The play contains the longest word in Greek, transliterated as:

Lopadotemachoselachogaleokranioleipsanodrimhypotrimmatosilphiokarabomelitokatakechymenokichlepikossyphophattoperisteralektryonoptekephalliokigklopeleiolagoiosiraiobaphetraganopterygon,

or, in the Greek alphabet:

λοπαδοτεμαχοσελαχογαλεοκρανιολειψανοδριμυποτριμματοσιλφιοκαραβομελιτοκατακεχυμενοκιχλεπικοσσυφοφαττοπεριστεραλεκτρυονοπτοκεφαλλιοκιγκλοπελειολαγῳοσιραιοβαφητραγανοπτερύγων. (1169–74)

Jeffrey Henderson translated the word as a stew of "limpets and saltfish and sharksteak and dogfish and mullets and oddfish with savory pickle sauce and thrushes with blackbirds and various pigeons and roosters and pan-roasted wagtails and larks and nice chunks of hare marinated in mulled wine and all of it drizzled with honey and silphium and vinegar, oil and spices galore." The Greek word contains 171 letters, which far surpasses that of Shakespeare's 27-letter long word, "honorificabilitudinitatibus" in his Love's Labour's Lost V.I.

== Translations ==
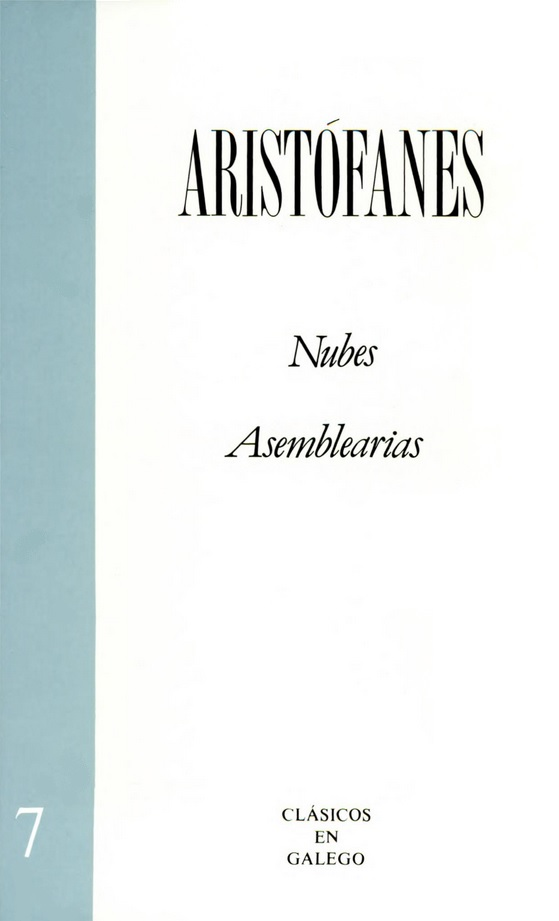
Cover of a Galician translation of Assemblywomen and The Clouds

- William James Hickie, 1853
- Eugene O'Neill Jr., 1938 – full text
- Jack Lindsay, 1971 – available for digital loan
- David Barrett, 1978 – available for digital loan
- Robert Mayhew, 1997
- Stephen Halliwell, 1998
- G. Theodoridis, 2004 – full prose text
