= Antidisestablishmentarianism (word) =

Long word in the English language

The English word antidisestablishmentarianism (UK /ˌæntidɪsɪˌstæblɪʃmənˈtɛəriənɪzəm/ US /ˌæntaɪ-/) is notable for its unusual length of 28 letters and 12 syllables, and is one of the longest words in the English language. It has been cited as the longest word in the English language (excluding coined and technical terms), although some dictionaries do not recognize it because of its low usage in everyday lexicon.

Antidisestablishmentarianism is a political position that originated in 19th century Britain. The position opposed proposals at that time to remove the Anglican Church's status as the established church of England, Ireland, and Wales, but not in Scotland, which had and still has its own separate national church.

The word became known in the public realm in the US via a popular television game show in the 1950s, The $64,000 Question, when a young contestant correctly spelled it to win.

== Recognition ==
There is varied recognition of antidisestablishmentarianism among major English dictionaries. Merriam-Webster does not recognize the word because it is practically unused in the modern era, although they do include disestablishmentarianism and antiestablishmentarianism.

The American Heritage Dictionary of the English Language, Chambers Dictionary, and Oxford English Dictionary similarly exclude antidisestablishmentarianism, but keep smaller variations.

Dictionaries that do include the word are the Cambridge Advanced Learner's Dictionary, Collins English, and Dictionary.com.

The longest word found in a major dictionary is pneumonoultramicroscopicsilicovolcanoconiosis, but this is a technical term that was coined specifically to be the longest word.

== Construction of the word ==
The word construction is as follows (succeeded by the number of letters in the word):

establish (9)
to set up, put in place, or institute (originally from the Latin stare, to stand)
dis-establish (12)
to end the established status of a body, in particular a church, given such status by law, such as the Church of England
disestablish-ment (16)
the separation of church and state (specifically, the goal of the political movement of the 1860s in Britain)
disestablishment-arian (21)
one who subscribes to said movement
anti-disestablishmentarian (25)
one who opposes said movement
antidisestablishmentarian-ism (28)
the movement or ideology that opposes disestablishment

The word construction could be lengthened further in many ways, for example:

antidisestablishmentarian-istically (35)
doing something with antidisestablishmentarian intentions

== In popular culture ==
A slightly longer but less commonly accepted variant can be found in the Duke Ellington song "You're Just an Old Antidisestablishmentarianismist".

== See also ==
- Longest word in English
- Nominalizations in English
