= Donaudampfschiffahrtsgesellschaft =

Shipping company

DDSG Blue Danube Schiffahrt GmbH
- Type: Public
- Industry: Shipping
- Founded: 1829; 197 years ago
- Successor: DDSG-Blue Danube Schiffahrt GmbH; DDSG-Cargo GmbH
- Headquarters: Vienna, Austria
- Services: Shipping, transport
- Parent: Reichswerke AG für Binnenschiffahrt Hermann Göring
- Website: www.ddsg-blue-danube.at

The Erste Donaudampfschiffahrtsgesellschaft (German pronunciation: [ˈeːɐ̯stə ˈdoːnaʊˌdampfˌʃɪffaːɐ̯tsɡəˌzɛlʃaft], lit. 'First-Danube-Steamboat-Shipping Company') or DDSG was a shipping company founded in 1829 by the Austrian government for transporting passengers and cargo on the Danube.

== History ==
The company built its first steamship building factory on the so-called "Óbuda Shipyard" on the Hajógyári Island in Kingdom of Hungary in 1835, which was the first industrial scale steamship building company in the Habsburg Empire.

In 1880, the DDSG was the world's largest river shipping company with more than 200 steamboat ships and about 1000 cargo tugs.

During Nazi rule, the DDSG was involved in transporting Austrian Jews after Kristallnacht, when the Jews were pressured to emigrate elsewhere. From 1938, the DDSG transported Jews who were on so-called "B-immigration transports". The DDSG was also involved in taking large amounts of money and property from Jews in order to transport them. The SS worked with the DDSG in making the exit permits for Jews easier to obtain, since the Nazis at the time simply wanted them to leave the country. Although the Gestapo had leverage over the DDSG, the DDSG was a group that operated on its own will, in order to profit from forced Jewish emigration.

In 1991, the company was split into a passenger transportation enterprise and a cargo transport company. The company was sold to a private owner in 1993. Today, the DDSG exists in the form of the two private companies — DDSG-Blue Danube Schiffahrt GmbH (passenger transport) and the DDSG-Cargo GmbH.

Ever since the German spelling reform of 1996, "-schifffahrt-" is written with three "f"s; as the name belongs to a company that existed before the spelling reform, the old form of the name is used when referring to the company.

The name of the company is well known in German-speaking countries as a starter to humorously construct even longer compound words. Donaudampfschiffahrtsgesellschaftskapitänsmütze is an example, which potentially might even have been used, but this is unlikely. It means a "DDSG captain's hat". Another common example is Donaudampfschiffahrtselektrizitätenhauptbetriebswerkbauunterbeamtengesellschaft which means "Association for Subordinate Officials of the Main Maintenance Building of the DDSG".
