= Lists of long and short words =

These are lists of long and short words and names.

== By language ==
- Longest words
- List of longest Croatian words
- Longest word in English
- Longest word in French
- Longest word in Romanian
- Longest word in Spanish
- Longest word in Turkish

== By subject ==
- List of short place names
- List of long place names
- List of short species names
- List of long species names
- Names of large numbers

== See also ==
- Compound (linguistics)
- Longest English sentence
- One-letter word
- Disambiguation pages for English letters:
  - A
  - B
  - C
  - D
  - E
  - F
  - G
  - H
  - I
  - J
  - K
  - L
  - M
  - N
  - O
  - P
  - Q
  - R
  - S
  - T
  - U
  - V
  - W
  - X
  - Y
  - Z
