= Spanish as a second or foreign language =

Use of Spanish as a non-native language

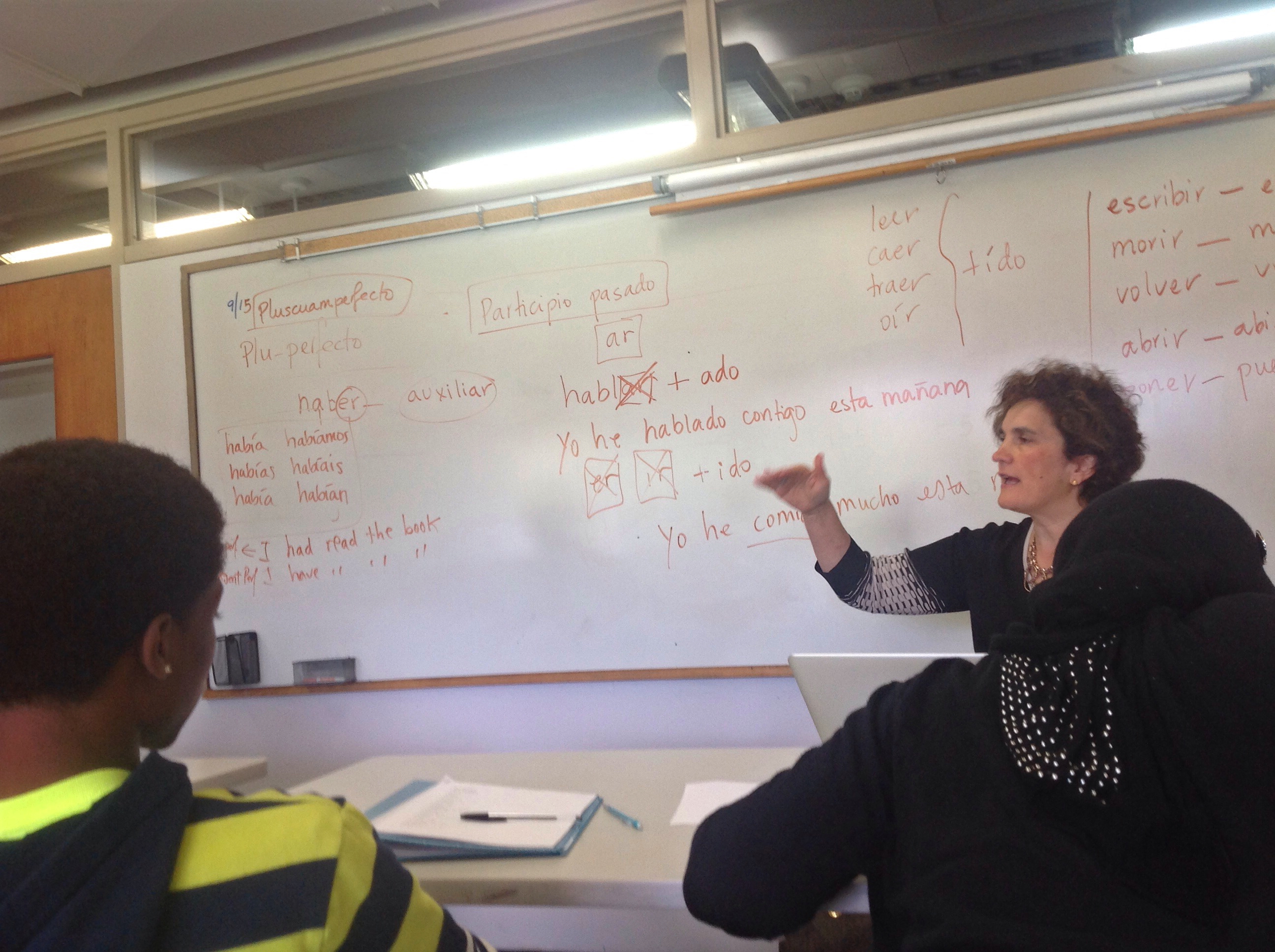
Spanish taught as a second language to a class of native English speakers at an American private school in Massachusetts

The term Spanish as a second or foreign language is the learning or teaching of the Spanish language for those whose first language is not Spanish.

== Regional programmes ==
=== Argentina ===
In October 2001, the Ministry of Education, Science and Technology and the Ministry of Foreign Relations, International Commerce and Culture of the Argentine Republic approved the guidelines in order to evaluate the knowledge and use of Spanish as a Second or Foreign Language in Argentina.

Meanwhile in 2004, a group of national universities created an inter-university consortium oriented towards the teaching, evaluation and certification of Spanish as a Second or Foreign Language (or ELSE from the Spanish, Español como Lengua Segunda y Extranjera), aiming to contribute to political and educational linguistics.

By June of the same year, three national universities (University of Buenos Aires (UBA), Universidad Litoral (UNL) and the University of Córdoba (UNC)) were working together to design and implement the first official examination to measure competence of Spanish as a foreign language. The exam is called CELU (Certificate of Use of Language in Spanish) and was approved by Resolution 28 in January 2005.

==== The Certification of Spanish Language and Use ====
The CELU (Certificate of Use of Language in Spanish) is a certificate of competence in the Spanish language from Argentina. Like the DELE (Diploma de Español como Lengua Extranjera), it also has international validity. The Certificate can be taken by speakers of any language other than Spanish in order to validate their knowledge of Spanish as a second language in their work or study.

In Argentina it is the only examination officially recognised by the Ministry of Education and the Ministry of Foreign Affairs and Culture. Any speaker who can use Spanish in an effective manner, whose goal is to interact efficiently with the other members of the community can take the CELU, independently of the course or method that was used to learn the language.

=== Spain ===
Español como lengua extranjera (ELE) is the term used to refer to various systems used by different learning institutions that teach the Spanish language to speakers of other languages, like the Escuelas Oficiales de Idiomas and the Instituto Cervantes.

Following the Common European Framework of Reference for Languages or the CEFR, these institutions offer examinations that will measure the competence of a learner. There are six exams (A1, A2, B1, B2, C1 and C2) which can be taken independently (i.e. it is not necessary to pass A1 to get B2) no matter the method of instruction used by the learners.

Español en Toledo, a Spanish course started by the University of Castile-La Mancha General Foundation, brings students to monuments and historical sites in the city of Toledo, Spain for more experiential learning.

==== Diplomas de Español como Lengua Extranjera ====
The "Diplomas de Español como Lengua Extranjera" (Certificates of Spanish as a Foreign Language) is an official diploma granted by the Instituto Cervantes on behalf of the Spanish Ministry of Education to evaluate a person's knowledge of Spanish.

There are six levels of qualification, each corresponding to a certain level described by the Common European Framework of Reference for Languages:

1. Diploma de Español (Nivel A1) (level A1): This qualification attests to sufficient linguistic ability for a very basic range of the most commonly simple expressions used in the Spanish-speaking world and in order to satisfy immediate needs of a concrete type.
2. Diploma de Español (Nivel A2) (level A2): This qualification attests to sufficient linguistic ability for understanding a basic range of the commonly simple and immediate relevance of expressions used in the Spanish-speaking world (basic personal and family information, shopping, local geography, employment).
3. Diploma de Español (Nivel B1) (level B1): This qualification attests to sufficient linguistic ability for understanding and responding appropriately in most normal day-to-day situations and for expressing desires and needs in a basic way.
4. Diploma de Español (Nivel B2) (level B2:This qualification validates sufficient linguistic ability to get by in average day-to-day situations in normal communication circumstances, which do not require specialized use of the language.
5. Diploma de Español (Nivel C1) (level C1): At this level, users are expected to be able to use the structures of a language with ease and fluency. Users are able to adapt their language use to a variety of social situations, and express opinions and take part in discussions
6. Diploma de Español (Nivel C2) (level C2): This qualification accredits the necessary linguistic competence to integrate in situations requiring an advanced use of the language and knowledge of the cultural customs embedded within it.

=== United States ===
Spanish is taught in schools all over the United States as a second or foreign language. The global number of Spanish-speakers consists of approximately 559 million persons. Objectives for Spanish-language education include preparing students to use the language for speaking, listening, reading and writing and to learn about the varied Spanish-speaking cultures as a context in which the language is used.

Spanish-language education in the United States aims to create global citizens competently able to communicate and collaborate with peoples from other cultures, who may be different from themselves, and thereby able to empathize with others' perspectives and experiences. In order to achieve this type of competency, teachers must obtain proficiency and receive training in language acquisition theory and methodology.

==== Teacher education requirements ====
Some requirements of language teachers are the following: demonstrate a high level of proficiency in listening, speaking, reading and writing; obtain a bachelor's degree in the Spanish language, perform a successful practicum in teaching the language with an experienced supervising teacher, and obtain a teaching license in the state in which the teacher will be employed.

To teach at a university, you will be required to have a degree in Philology or Translation, a master's degree and a doctorate. On the other hand, to give private Spanish classes there are no mandatory requirements, although it is advisable to have specific training in Spanish as a foreign language.

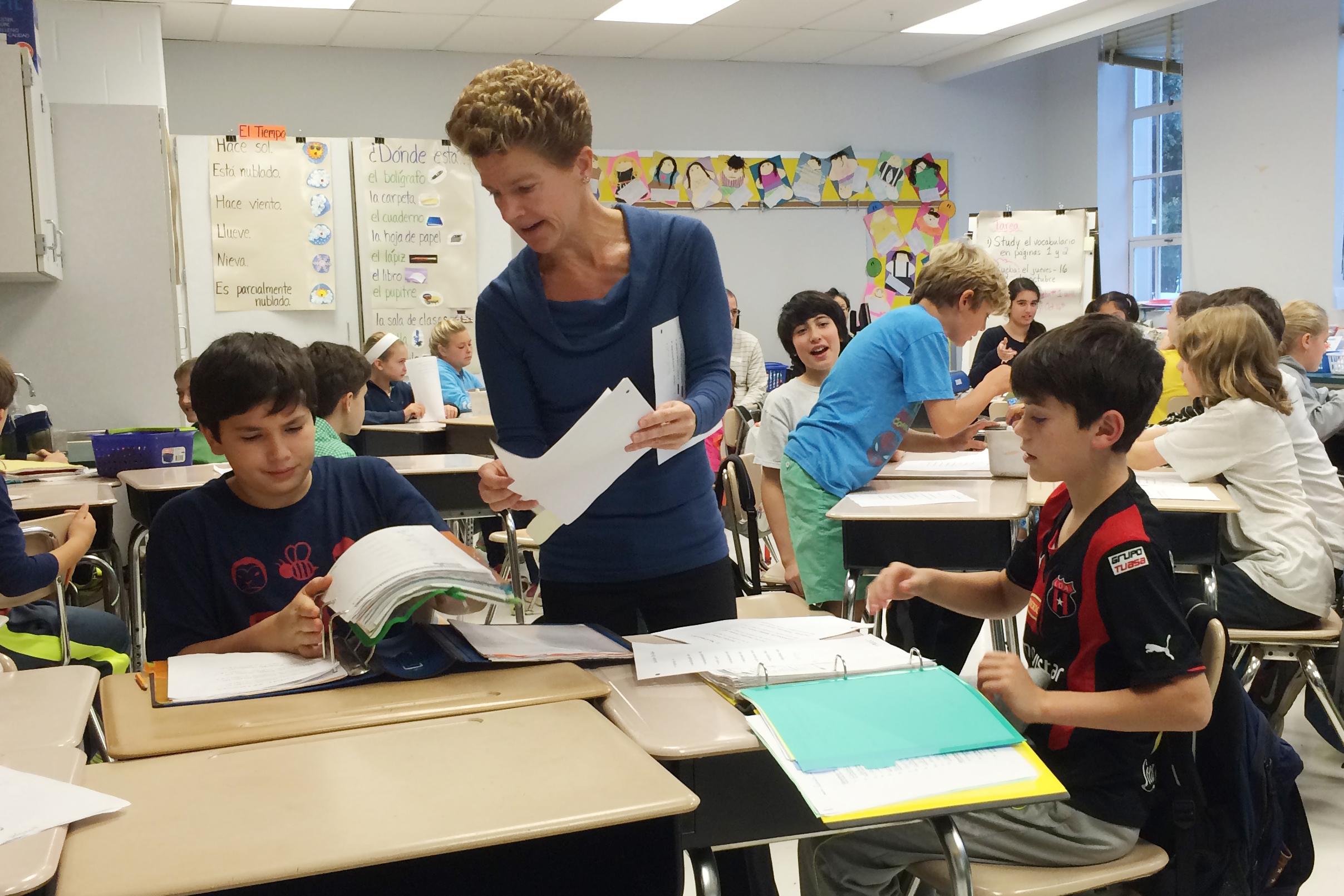

==== Teaching methodology ====
Practices in teaching methods were designed with theories of language and language acquisition, as well as educational trends of the time. Language teachers learn of the varying methodologies and their role in the history of language education and implement them according to instructional need. The following are methodologies that reflect how theories of language acquisition have adapted over time:

- The Grammar-translation method promoted translating texts between students' first language and the target language, emphasizing reading and writing skills.
- The Direct method focused on the use of the target language for instruction, avoiding the use of students' native language. Use of realia, pictures, gestures, question/response and dictation were instrumental in the development of oral instruction provided via the direct method.
- The Audio-lingual method used dialogues to promote students' learning of chunks of language with repetition, imitation and methodological practices and exercises that were to develop listening and speaking skills in a non-spontaneous context.
- The Silent Way maintained the principle of deductive instruction in which students are provided context from which they deduce how the language is used (grammatical rules) in the samples provided them

==== Language Standards ====
The standards taught in world language classes are those set by The American Council on the Teaching of Foreign Languages (ACTFL), which combine "the 5 C's": Communication, Culture, Connections, Comparisons and Community. In addition to the standards, ACTFL also provides proficiency guidelines and performance descriptors to aid teachers and administrators determine students' individual performance and level of language in all four skills: listening, speaking, reading and writing. Established in 1967, ACTFL has provided language educators with tools for instruction and opportunities for professional growth. ACTFL "has set industry standards, established proficiency guidelines, advocated for language education funding, and connected colleagues at the ACTFL Annual Convention".

== Resources ==
There are a vast number of resources online, including both resources dedicated specifically to the study of Spanish as a second language, as well as more general resources, such as Infoling.

== See also ==
- English as a second or foreign language
- Language education
- List of countries where Spanish is an official language
- List of English–Spanish interlingual homographs
- Most common words in Spanish
- Second-language acquisition
- Spanish Champs, Spanish education curriculum
