= List of English–Spanish interlingual homographs =

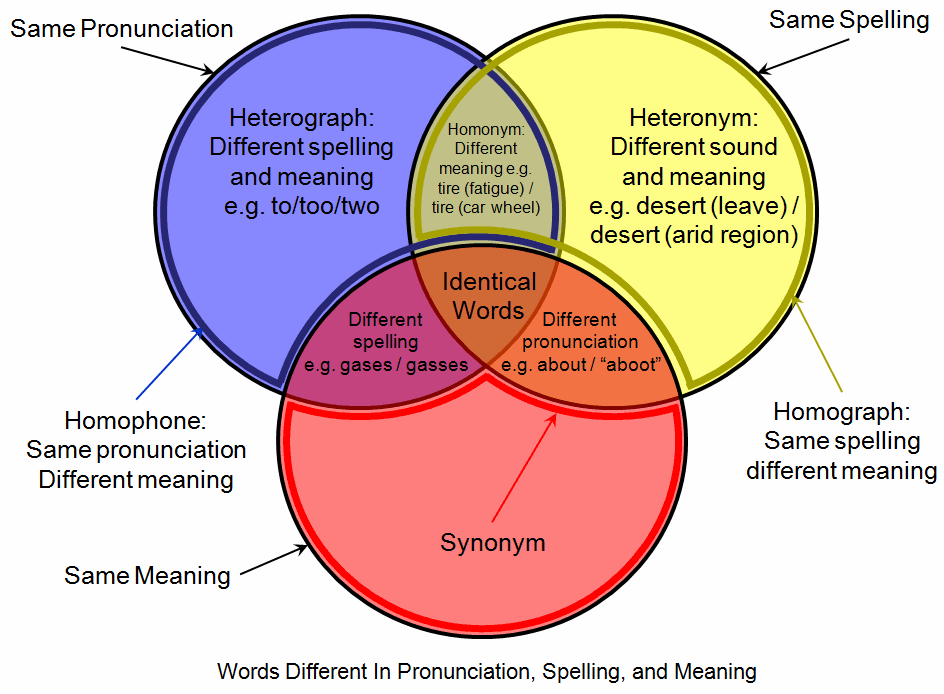
How words in one or more languages can differ in pronunciation, spelling, and meaning (click to enlarge)

This is a list of words that occur in both the English language and the Spanish language, but which have different meanings and/or pronunciations in each language. Such words are called interlingual homographs. Homographs are two or more words that have the same written form.

This list includes only homographs that are written precisely the same in English and Spanish: They have the same spelling, hyphenation, capitalization, word dividers, etc. It excludes proper nouns and words that have different diacritics (e.g., invasion/invasión, pâté/paté).

== Relationships between words ==
The words below are categorised based on their relationship: cognates, false cognates, false friends, and modern loanwords. Cognates are words that have a common etymological origin. False cognates are words in different languages that seem to be cognates because they look similar and may even have similar meanings, but which do not share a common ancestor. False friends do share a common ancestor, but even though they look alike or sound similar, they differ significantly in meaning. Loanwords are words that are adopted from one language into another. Since this article is about homographs, the loanwords listed here are written the same not only in English and Spanish, but also in the language that the word came from.

Many of the words in the list are Latin cognates. Because Spanish is a Romance language (which means it evolved from Latin), many of its words are either inherited from Latin or derive from Latin words. Although English is a Germanic language, it, too, incorporates thousands of Latinate words that are related to words in Spanish. Yet even with so many Latin cognates, only a small minority are written precisely the same in both languages.

Even though the words in this list are written the same in both languages, none of them are pronounced the same—not even the word no.

== Cognates ==
The cognates in the table below share meanings in English and Spanish, but have different pronunciation.

Some words entered Middle English and Early Modern Spanish indirectly and at different times. For example, a Latinate word might enter English by way of Old French, but enter Spanish directly from Latin. Such differences can introduce changes in spelling and meaning.

Although most of the cognates have at least one meaning shared by English and Spanish, they can have other meanings that are not shared. A word might also be used in different contexts in each language.

=== Arabic cognates ===
1. alcohol
2. alfalfa
3. henna (Note: In Spanish, the preferred word is alheña.)
4. imam
5. soda (Note: False friends)

=== Aymara cognates ===
1. alpaca(s)

=== German cognates ===
1. zinc

=== Greek cognates ===
All of the following Greek cognates are nouns. In addition, gas and gases are verbs in English.

1. amnesia
2. anemia(s)
3. aorta(s)
4. auto(s)
5. beta(s)
6. drama(s)
7. enema(s)
8. gas(es)
9. gastritis
10. gingivitis
11. melodrama(s)
12. metro(s)
13. otitis
14. panorama(s)
15. sepia(s)
16. zeta(s)

=== Japanese cognates ===
1. judo
2. karaoke
3. kimono
4. mecha(s) (Note: From Japanese メカ (meka), an abbreviation of the English adjective mechanical)
5. sushi
6. tsunami(s)

=== Latin cognates ===
1. abdomen
2. absorbed
3. abuse(s)
4. accede(s)
5. acceded
6. acuse(s)
7. admire(s)
8. antecede(s)
9. anteceded
10. adore(s)
11. alias
12. anterior
13. arteriosclerosis
14. ascended
15. aspire(s)
16. atlas
17. balance(s)
18. base(s)
19. calibre(s)
20. cede(s)
21. cheque(s)
22. civil
23. clan
24. combine(s)
25. compare(s)
26. compile(s)
27. complete(s)
28. concede(s)
29. condense(s)
30. conserve(s)
31. converse(s)
32. console(s)
33. contended
34. control
35. converge(s)
36. converged
37. cosmos
38. cruel
39. debate(s)
40. declare(s)
41. defended
42. define(s)
43. depended
44. depone(s)
45. deponed
46. derive(s)
47. detective(s)
48. determine(s)
49. diabetes
50. dispute(s)
51. don (Note: False friends)
52. eclipse(s) (Note: Originally Greek)
53. emerge(s)
54. emerged
55. enclave(s)
56. escape(s)
57. excuse(s)
58. exhale(s)
59. expulse(s)
60. fallen
61. fatigue(s)
62. formula(s)
63. fume(s)
64. fusile(s)
65. gratis
66. grave(s)
67. herpes
68. ignore(s)
69. imagine(s)
70. indices
71. induce(s)
72. impulse(s)
73. inclusive
74. inflame(s)
75. inspire(s)
76. invite(s)
77. laurel
78. marches
79. mire(s)
80. move(s)
81. mediocre
82. nave(s)
83. noble
84. oasis
85. observe(s)
86. opine(s)
87. parasol
88. pare(s)
89. patine(s)
90. pelvis
91. perfume(s)
92. plan(es)
93. precede(s)
94. preceded
95. prepare(s)
96. pretended
97. pulse(s)
98. pubis
99. recuse(s)
100. relieve(s)
101. removed
102. resolved
103. respire(s)
104. responded
105. semen
106. simple
107. sublime
108. suspense
109. tended
110. tire(s)
111. use(s)
112. vended
113. virus
114. vote(s) (Note: In Spanish, vote is a verb: the formal singular imperative (et al.) of votar: The noun is voto.)

==== Words with an -a ending ====
1. acacia
2. academia
3. ala
4. alga
5. arena(s)
6. aroma(s) (Note: Originally Greek)
7. aula(s)
8. aurora(s)
9. azalea(s)
10. bacteria
11. campana(s)
12. concha(s) (Note: False friends)
13. errata(s)
14. extra(s)
15. fauna(s)
16. flora(s)
17. gardenia(s)
18. hernia(s)
19. idea(s)
20. influenza(s)
21. insignia(s)
22. lava(s)
23. media(s)
24. nostalgia
25. pasta(s)
26. persona(s)
27. petunia(s)
28. retina(s)
29. saliva(s)
30. vagina(s)
31. villa(s)
32. visa(s)

==== Words with an -able ending ====
1. abominable
2. adaptable
3. adjustable
4. admirable
5. adoptable
6. adorable
7. alterable
8. amortizable
9. bailable
10. biodegradable
11. cable
12. comparable
13. computable
14. culpable
15. curable
16. degradable
17. durable(s)
18. evitable
19. favorable
20. habitable
21. implacable
22. improbable
23. inalterable
24. inevitable
25. innumerable
26. irritable
27. laudable
28. miserable
29. notable
30. penetrable
31. rentable
32. sociable
33. utilizable
34. variable(s)
35. vulnerable

==== Words with an -al ending ====
All of the following words are adjectives and/or nouns.

1. abdominal
2. aboriginal
3. accidental
4. actual (Note: False friends)
5. adverbial
6. anal
7. animal
8. arsenal
9. arterial
10. artificial
11. asexual
12. astral
13. austral
14. autumnal
15. aval
16. axial
17. banal
18. bestial
19. bicameral
20. brutal
21. cabal
22. canal
23. cantal
24. capital
25. cardinal
26. carnal
27. caudal
28. causal
29. central
30. cereal
31. ceremonial
32. coaxial
33. continental
34. cordial
35. corporal
36. cultural
37. decagonal
38. decimal
39. diagonal
40. dual
41. ducal
42. editorial
43. episcopal
44. eternal
45. eventual
46. experimental
47. facial
48. fatal
49. fecal
50. federal
51. femoral
52. ferial
53. festival
54. fetal
55. feudal
56. filial
57. final
58. fiscal
59. focal
60. formal
61. funeral
62. general
63. genial
64. genital
65. global
66. gradual
67. habitual
68. heptagonal
69. hexagonal
70. homosexual
71. horizontal
72. hospital
73. ideal
74. imperial
75. impersonal
76. individual
77. infernal
78. informal
79. jovial
80. labial
81. laical
82. lateral
83. latitudinal
84. legal
85. local
86. longitudinal
87. madrigal
88. magisterial
89. magistral
90. mal
91. manual
92. marginal
93. marital
94. marsupial
95. material
96. mayoral
97. medieval
98. mental
99. metal
100. mineral
101. moral
102. mural
103. nasal
104. natal
105. natural
106. naval
107. nonagonal
108. normal
109. occidental
110. octagonal
111. oral
112. ordinal
113. original
114. oval
115. paranormal
116. pedal
117. pedestal
118. penal
119. pentagonal
120. personal
121. plural
122. portal
123. principal
124. provincial
125. provisional
126. racial
127. radial
128. radical
129. recital
130. rectal
131. regional
132. ritual
133. rival
134. rural
135. sexual
136. social
137. subnormal
138. temporal
139. terminal
140. total
141. transversal
142. trivial
143. umbilical
144. umbral
145. universal
146. usual
147. vaginal
148. visual
149. vertical
150. vocal
151. zodiacal

==== Words with an -ar ending ====
1. altar
2. articular
3. auricular
4. auxiliar
5. circular
6. cultivar
7. insular
8. irregular
9. lar
10. lunar
11. nuclear
12. ocular
13. peculiar
14. perpendicular
15. polar
16. pulsar
17. popular
18. rectangular
19. regular
20. similar
21. singular
22. solar
23. tabular
24. talar
25. uvular
26. vallar
27. valvular
28. vascular
29. vulgar

==== Words with an -el ending ====
1. cartel (Note: False friends) (Note: In some Spanish-speaking countries, cartel may alternately be spelled cártel.)
2. pastel

==== Words with an -er ending ====
1. defender
2. deponer (Note: False friends)
3. emerger
4. mover
5. pretender
6. primer
7. remover
8. resolver
9. responder
10. revolver
11. suspender
12. tender

==== Words with an -ible ending ====
1. audible
2. combustible(s)
3. comestible(s)
4. compatible
5. destructible
6. flexible
7. fusible
8. horrible
9. incompatible
10. incombustible(s)
11. indestructible
12. inflexible
13. intangible(s)
14. irresistible
15. irreversible
16. ostensible
17. reversible
18. sensible (Note: False friends)
19. tangible
20. terrible

==== Words with an -o ending ====
1. canto
2. credo(s)
3. euro(s)
4. folio(s)
5. gusto (Note: False friends)
6. halo (Note: Originally Greek)
7. primo
8. radio(s)
9. solo(s)
10. tornado(s)
11. veto(s)
12. video(s)

==== Words with an -or ending ====
All of the following words are adjectives and/or nouns.

1. actor
2. auditor
3. candor
4. clamor (Note: In English, also functions as an intransitive verb)
5. conductor
6. doctor (Note: In English, also functions as either an intransitive or transitive verb)
7. exterior
8. factor
9. favor
10. furor
11. honor
12. horror
13. humor
14. inferior
15. interior
16. interlocutor
17. labor
18. labrador (Note: False friends)
19. mayor
20. monitor
21. motor
22. pastor
23. posterior
24. reactor
25. rector
26. rumor
27. sector
28. superior
29. supervisor
30. terror
31. vigor

=== Māori cognates ===
1. kiwi(s) (Note: Entered Spanish via English)

=== Nahuatl cognates ===
1. avocado(s)
2. chocolate(s)
3. coyote(s)
4. guacamole(s)
5. peyote(s)
6. quetzal
7. tamales

=== Proto-Indo-European cognates ===
1. me
2. no
3. gripe(s) (Note: In Spanish, gripe ("the flu") is a loanword from French (grippe). The English word grip also comes from grippe. All of these words have the same Proto-Indo-European origin as a verb that means "to grab" or "to grasp".)

=== Quechua cognates ===
1. guano(s) (Note: Entered English via Spanish)
2. poncho(s) (Note: Or possibly from the Mapuche language)
3. pisco(s) (Note: Entered English via Spanish)

=== Russian cognates ===
1. vodka(s)

=== Sinhalese cognates ===
1. anaconda(s)

=== Taíno cognates ===
1. iguana(s) (Note: Spanish corruption of the Taíno word iwana, which entered Spanish via English.)

=== Tamil cognates ===
1. mango(s) (Note: Mango is a multi-generational corruption from Tamil that entered English via the Portuguese word manga.)

=== Tupi cognates ===
1. jaguar
2. tapioca

=== Turkish cognates ===
1. fez

=== Wolof cognates ===
1. banana(s) (Note: Possibly from one of the Niger–Congo languages other than Wolof; entered English via either Spanish or Portuguese)

== False cognates ==
Although the words in this section are written identically in English and Spanish, they have different meanings in each language, and they are not cognates.

1. a
2. afear
3. alas
4. aliases
5. as
6. auditoria
7. ave
8. barred
9. batiste
10. bote
11. calla
12. can(es)
13. case
14. cola(s)
15. coma(s)
16. come(s)
17. con
18. da(s)
19. dad
20. dais
21. dan
22. den
23. dice(s)
24. dime(s)
25. dinos
26. do(s)
27. doled
28. done
29. dude(s)
30. ex(es)
31. fresco(s)
32. gala(s)
33. gane
34. gen
35. gran(es)
36. grape(s)
37. ha(s)
38. hay
39. he
40. id
41. ingle(s)
42. intended
43. la(s)
44. lamer
45. lave(s)
46. lea(s)
47. lean
48. lee(s)
49. leed
50. leer
51. leo
52. liar
53. lote(s)
54. manga(s)
55. mar(es)
56. mate(s)
57. maya
58. mayo(s)
59. mead
60. meter
61. mole(s)
62. mote(s)
63. once
64. pacer
65. pagan
66. pan(es)
67. papa(s)
68. par(es)
69. pedo(s)
70. pee(s)
71. peed
72. peen
73. peer
74. pica(s)
75. pie(s)
76. pillar
77. pita(s)
78. placer
79. playa(s)
80. publican
81. quince
82. quite
83. rape(s)
84. red(es)
85. remate(s)
86. replicase(s)
87. robe(s)
88. romped
89. romper
90. saber
91. sable(s)
92. salve(s)
93. sauce(s)
94. sin
95. so
96. son
97. taller
98. ten
99. tender
100. tolled
101. toller
102. tose(s)
103. tosed
104. urge(s)
105. vale(s)
106. van
107. viola(s)

== Loanwords ==
The table below lists English-to-Spanish and Spanish-to-English loanwords, as well as loanwords from other modern languages that share the same orthography in both English and Spanish. In some cases, the common orthography resulted because a word entered the Spanish lexicon via English. These loanwords may retain spelling conventions that are foreign to Spanish (as in whisky). In Spanish, only loanwords use the letters k and w.

=== English-to-Spanish loanwords ===
All of the following loanwords are either nouns or gerunds. Words ending in -ing are gerunds in English and nouns in Spanish.

1. airbag(s)
2. antivirus
3. audiovisual
4. backup
5. banjo(s)
6. bit(s)
7. byte
8. camping
9. chat(s)
10. chip(s)
11. clip(s)
12. club(s)
13. collie
14. convoy
15. doping
16. email(s)
17. gag(s)
18. gene(s)
19. hangar
20. iceberg
21. input(s)
22. jersey
23. jumbo
24. magnate(s)
25. modem
26. motocross
27. multimedia
28. parking
29. picnic(s)
30. polo(s)
31. pop (Note: Applies only to the music genre sense of the word.)
32. pub(s)
33. punk(s)
34. radar
35. rail
36. rally
37. rifle(s)
38. ring
39. robot(s)
40. rock
41. rugby
42. shock(s)
43. shorts
44. show(s)
45. software
46. sprint(s)
47. surf
48. test(s)
49. unisex
50. whisky
51. windsurfing
52. yuppie

=== Spanish-to-English loanwords ===
Although the meanings of the following loanwords overlap, most of them have different senses and/or shades of meaning in Spanish and English. Generally, loanwords have more diverse and nuanced meanings in the originating language than they do in the adopting language.

1. armada(s)
2. armadillo(s)
3. arroyo(s)
4. ayuntamiento(s)
5. azulejo(s)
6. bajada(s)
7. balsa(s)
8. banda
9. banderilla(s)
10. burro(s)
11. caballero(s)
12. cacao
13. coca
14. cria(s)
15. esparto(s)
16. guerrilla(s)
17. hacienda(s)
18. hammock(s) (Note: Spanish word hamaca comes from Taino "hamaka".)
19. hidalgo(s)
20. hombre(s)
21. jalapeño(s)
22. machete(s)
23. macho
24. mantilla(s)
25. manzanilla
26. maraca(s)
27. margarita(s)
28. marina(s)
29. masa
30. matador
31. menudo(s)
32. mestizo(s)
33. mosquito(s) (Note: In Spanish, mosca means "fly"; mosquito literally means "little fly".)
34. mulato(s)
35. nacho(s)
36. nada
37. negro
38. padre(s)
39. paella(s)
40. patio(s)
41. peluca
42. peseta(s)
43. peso(s)
44. picador
45. pimiento(s)
46. pinto
47. piñata(s)
48. plaza(s)
49. pronto
50. pueblo(s)
51. rodeo(s)
52. rumba
53. salsa(s)
54. suave
55. taco(s)
56. tango(s)
57. tapa(s)
58. tequila(s)
59. tortilla(s)

=== Loanwords from other languages ===
The following loanwords occur in both Modern English and Modern Spanish, but originated in another language. Several of the words entered the Spanish language via English.

==== From Finnish ====
1. sauna(s)

==== From French ====
1. autoclave(s)
2. ballet(s)
3. canapé
4. postal
5. taxi(s) (Note: In French, taxi is an abbreviation of taximètre (taximeter).)

==== From Italian ====
1. adagio(s)
2. aria(s)
3. mafia(s)
4. pizza(s)
5. ravioli(s)

==== From Quechua ====
1. llama(s) (Note: Entered English via Spanish)
2. puma(s) (Note: Entered English via Spanish)

==== From Swahili ====
1. safari(s)

==== From Zulu ====
1. impala(s)

== See also ==
- Comparative linguistics
- Homograph
- Pseudo-anglicism

English-specific

- English orthography
- History of English
- Foreign language influences in English
- List of English homographs
- List of Germanic and Latinate equivalents in English
- Lists of English words by country or language of origin
- Longest word in English
- Most common words in English

Spanish-specific

- Spanish orthography
- History of the Spanish language
- Influences on the Spanish language
- Longest word in Spanish
- Most common words in Spanish
