= List of Chinese–Japanese false friends =

There are many false friendships between the Chinese and Japanese languages. These are words that look or sound similar to those in another language but have a significantly different meaning. The majority of these false friends result from the use of Chinese characters in the Japanese script, called Kanji.

== History ==
According to Chinese legend, Chinese characters were invented by Cangjie, one of the bureaucrats under the Yellow Thearch who coined symbols known as "zi" (字) following a study of the landscape, animals, and the galaxy seen in the sky. "Zì" (字) was said to be the first Chinese character created, and Cangjie supposedly related it to a mythical story of the day these characters were created.

Chinese words and characters were introduced to Japan through letters, coins, swords, and seals imported from China. As far as is currently known, King of Na gold is the earliest import bearing Chinese characters. This gold was presented to Yamato by Emperor Guangwu of Han. The Japanese of this era most likely had no knowledge of scripts and seem to have remained illiterate until the fifth century.

The earliest known Japanese documents were written by Korean officials and bilingual Chinese employed at the Yamato court. Afterwards, a group of people known as the fuhito were organised under the monarch to read and write Chinese characters. The Yamato court began sending full-scale diplomatic missions to China, leading to increased literacy within the Japanese court. The Chinese characters could be stencilled onto thin rectangular strips of wood, which aided communication during this time.

As a result of the aforementioned lack of a Japanese writing system, Chinese was used almost exclusively in texts. The Heian period (794–1185) facilitated the emergence of a system known as kanbun, which involved the use of Chinese text with diacritical marks that allowed Japanese speakers to read and restructure Chinese sentences. Chinese characters also came to be used in writing Japanese words phonetically, resulting in modern kana syllabaries. Japan adopted a writing system known as man'yōgana and used it to write the ancient poetry anthology Man'yōshū. This anthology used a number of Chinese characters.

== Adaptation of kanji ==
In modern Japanese, kanji is integrated into writing systems through content words such as adjective stems, noun, and verb stems. The growth experienced in the integration of kanji in writing systems has increased the number of false friends existing between the Chinese and Japanese languages. In some instances, kanji is considered difficult to read relating to the context applied. For instance, hiragana and katakana are writing systems that descend from kanji and have characters that are used to write phonetic complements, adjective endings, and inflected verbs used to disambiguate readings and give simple definitions to some miscellaneous words that are hard to comprehend in the writing systems.

Chinese characters are among the most widely adopted and oldest writing systems. In addition, the Chinese characters are integrated into the learning systems of most nations in East Asia and predominate in China and Japan. Consequently, most of the characters used in Japanese kanji adopt their meaning from the Chinese logographic characters. Functional literacy in written Chinese requires knowledge of between three and four thousand characters, as shown in Chinese studies.

Both Japanese kanji and Chinese characters were simplified around the World War II era (shinjitai and the Chinese Character Simplification Scheme, respectively). There are numerous national standard lists of characters, pronunciations, and forms that are distinctly defined by Japanese kanji and Chinese writing systems. In Japanese orthography, a substantial number of common characters have simplified forms that have been used since the end of WWII. Most uncommon characters are written in Japanese traditional forms that are identical or nearly identical to the Chinese traditional forms. Characters have been simplified in Mainland China as well. Today, many characters are used with similar pronunciation and structure but have different meanings according to the respective languages.

== Cultural effects ==
False friends in writing systems occur when words in two distinct languages resemble each other in structural appearance or sound but have a different meaning. False friends can be identified as homophones, although they are culturally bound since they are defined in two particular languages. False friends have impacts on the cultural definition of the societies using the languages. For instance, the Chinese language uses numerous characters that define its language. Japanese kanji that emanate from Chinese traditional characters define the Japanese language. Consequently, the Japanese language has most of its words borrowed and developed from the Chinese tradition. The two distinct languages tend to share a similar linguistic history, which is characterised by the use of homographs in the language. However, the fact that the two languages share a similar linguistic history has motivated the usage of similar words in the languages that have distinct meanings.

The Chinese and Japanese languages use words that are similar but have different pronunciations and meanings in their respective languages. The Chinese and Japanese languages have numerous false friends. False friends present linguistic homographs and synonyms based on the culturally and societally bound languages. Among the cultural effects are contresense, which occurs when a writer uses a false friend in a context whose meaning is the opposite of the original meaning. In modern society, writing systems have been improved following the increased number of characters integrated into the systems. The difference in pronunciation and meaning indicates homograph elements in false friends. This supports the fact that the Japanese language was developed from literary Chinese.

Most of the Chinese and Japanese false friends arise through various actions of semantic change. Since most of the Japanese language characters are borrowed from the Chinese language, there is a shift that defines the similarity of the context presented. This motivates the need to be careful while writing since the meanings between the paired languages have very different raising definitions that differ in very distinct contexts. Chinese and Japanese cultures have distinct social and cultural activities that define different terminologies that determine the nature of the context to be published. A bilingual writer seeking to publish context in Chinese and Japanese needs to be aware of false friends in order to present context that draws similar meaning to both languages. Most language learners fall into the false friends trap in the learning process.

== List of false friends ==
This list highlights some commonly encountered false friends.

Word			Definition		Remarks
Chinese (Traditional)	Japanese (Shinjitai)	Chinese (Simplified)	(Standard) Chinese	Japanese	Remarks
私			private, selfish or personal	I, me, myself	Also a first-person singular pronoun in Classical Chinese.
娘			mother; woman (esp. young girl)	daughter; young girl	
湯		汤	soup	hot water; hot spring	Also means hot water in Eastern Min and Classical Chinese.
侍	侍		to wait upon; to serve	samurai; servant	
走			to walk	to run	Also means run in Cantonese, Hakka, Min, and Classical Chinese.
王妃			princess consort; concubine of king	queen consort	
棚			tent; shed	shelf	
腕	腕		wrist	arm	
鳥		鸟	bird	chicken or bird (dependent on context)	
豬	猪		pig	boar	
手紙	手紙	手纸	toilet paper	a letter (written message)	
不勉強	不勉強	不勉强	(literally) not forced	idleness	
汽車			automobile and motor vehicle	a steam locomotive	
先生			sir, mister or teacher	teacher	
愛人			a lover or mistress; a spouse, wife or husband (PRC only)	a lover or mistress	
連帶	連帯	连带	to be related; to be involved; to be entailed	solidarity	
老婆			wife	old woman	
小人			villain, person of low status / character	child, small person	Also means child in Wu Chinese.
丈夫			husband or brave gentleman	durable, unbreakable or robustness; health	
大丈夫			real man, man of character	all right, okay	
風船		风船	sailboat	balloon	
邪魔			a demon; wicked spirit; the devil	a hindrance, obstacle or nuisance; (Buddhism) demon	
非常			very; extremely; (formal) extraordinary; unusual	something unusual; extraordinary; emergency or unusual	In Japanese, 非常 on its own means emergency, 非常に means very (same as Chinese).
前年	前年		the year before last year	last year; the previous year	
方面			aspect	direction	
情報	情報	情报	intelligence; information (of a military or espionage nature)	news, information or gossip	
檢討	検討	检讨	self-criticism	consideration; discussion	
新聞	新聞	新闻	news	newspaper	Originally a clipping of 新聞紙 Japanese.
約束	約束	约束	to restrain; (mathematics and databases) a constraint	an appointment or promise	
暗算			scheme; to plot against	mental arithmetic	
人間		人间	the material world; human society	human	
說話	説話	说话	to speak	a folktale or story	
交代			to hand over; to explain; to confess	alternation; change; relief; (work) shift; taking turns	
格式			format; model	formality; social rules; social standing; math expression	
應酬	応酬	应酬	to socialize; social activity; dinner party	a retort; a response	
人參/人蔘	人参		ginseng	carrot; ginseng	
放心			to be at ease	to be in a trance; to be at ease	
旅館	旅館	旅馆	hotel	a Japanese traditional-style inn	
風俗		风俗	social tradition	social customs; the sex industry (euphemistically)	
天井			atrium or courtyard	ceiling	
中古			the Middle Ages	a second-hand item	
樂	楽	乐	happiness; fun; joy; pleasure	ease; comfort	楽しい means fun in Japanese.
標榜	標榜	标榜	the act of advertising; to parade; to brag or to boast	standing for someone; advocacy	
浴衣			a bathrobe	yukata, a type of light robe mainly used for casual wear	
親友	親友	亲友	close friends and relatives collectively	a close friend	
文句			syntax and wording in a given manuscript	a complaint	
手心			hollow of one's palm	consideration	
醫生	医生		medical doctor	medical student	
扁桃體	扁桃体	扁桃体	tonsil (chiefly PRC)	amygdala	
電車	電車	电车	tram	electric multiple unit train	
怪我			(literally) to blame me	injury	In Japanese, the kanji are ateji.
我慢			(literally) I am slow	patience	In Japanese, the kanji are ateji.
馬鹿		马鹿	horse and deer	idiot	In Japanese, the kanji are ateji.
切手			(literally) to cut one's hand	postage stamp	The meaning of postage stamp is borrowed into Taiwanese Hakka and Hokkien.
適當	適当	适当	suitable	suitable; half-minded, sloppy	
坊			workshop	monk; monks dwelling; boy	
明白			to understand; clear, obvious	clear, obvious	
床			bed	floor	
茶碗			tea bowl, teacup	teacup, rice bowl	
可憐		可怜	to pity, pitiful	sweet (e.g. young girls, flowers blooming), touchingly lovely; pitiful	
麒麟			qilin, mythical creature	qilin, giraffe	Also means giraffe in Taiwanese Hokkien and literary Chinese.
皮肉			(literally) skin and flesh	irony; sarcasm	
女將	女将	女将	female military officer	proprietress (of a traditional Japanese inn, restaurant, shop), landlady	
大家			everybody	landlord	
工夫			time and effort to do something	devising a way, contriving	
噓		嘘	to exhale slowly, to sigh	lie	
野菜			edible wild herbs	vegetable	
下手			to start doing	unskilled, bad at	
演出			to perform	to direct (a movie, play)	
暴走			to walk tirelessly	acting rashly; running wildly	
先輩		先辈	older generation, elder	senior (at school, work), superior	
高等學校	高等学校		college, university	high school	
大名			formal name	Japanese feudal lord	
勉強		勉强	far-fetched	study	
葛藤			Kudzu	conflict; complication; troubles; discord	
