= Certificate of Use of Language in Spanish =

Argentinian Spanish language proficiency test

The Certificate of Use of Language in Spanish, or CELU (Spanish: Certificado de Español: Lengua y Uso), is an exam designed to determine the level of proficiency in the Argentinian Spanish language. The exam can be taken by anyone whose mother language is not Spanish and needs to demonstrate he has a certain level of proficiency of the language, whether it is for working or studying, in Spanish-speaking countries. The exam is required by universities in Argentina for foreigners and it is also accepted as a valid exam in Brazil and China.

== Candidates ==
Any person whose mother language is not Spanish can take this exam. They must be at least 16 years of age and certify a minimum three years of high school education (EGB III according to the current educational system in Argentina, roughly someone who has just passed to the 12th grade in the American system).

Passing the exam fulfills the language requirements for studying or working in Argentina where knowledge of Spanish is a requirement.

== Grading ==
There are two "pass" grades, either "Intermediate" or "Advanced" level, awarded to candidates who achieve these grades. Candidates who do not pass are not given a grade. Both grades reflect how proficient the person is in the use of Spanish as a foreign language, especially in dealing with everyday situations and work related or academic issues.

This exam is aimed at certifying a certain level of command of the language, therefore, regardless of the regional variation a candidate may know, they will be able to understand the situations to be dealt with in the exam.

== Acceptance ==
The CELU is recognized as a certificate which demonstrates a person's knowledge of the Spanish language in:

- Argentina
- Brazil
- China
- Italy

== Parts of the Exam ==
Format
Section	Skills	Time Allowed	Activity
Written	Reading; Listening; Writing	3 hours	Listening to texts; Producing an essay aimed at an informal or a formal reader.
Oral	Reading; Listening; Speaking	15 to 20 minutes	Reading short texts and discussing them

== Dates ==
Exams are taken in June and November. Application is opened three months prior to the examination dates and remains open for about one month.

== Exam venues ==
In Argentina:

- Buenos Aires
- Córdoba
- La Pampa
- La Plata
- Mar del Plata
- Quilmes
- Río Cuarto
- San Luis
- San Martín
- Santa Fe
- Tandil
- San Fernando del Valle de Catamarca
- Paraná, Entre Ríos

In Brazil:

- Brasília
- Campinas
- Curitiba
- Rio de Janeiro
- São Paulo
- Porto Alegre
- Santa Maria

In Germany:

- Berlin

In France:

- Paris

In Russia:

- Moscow

== University Consortium for the Evaluation of Knowledge and Use of Spanish as a Second Language ==
The following Universities are currently part of the Consortium:

- Universidad de Buenos Aires
- Universidad Nacional de Catamarca
- Universidad Nacional del Centro de la Provincia de Buenos Aires
- Universidad Nacional del Comahue
- Universidad Nacional de Córdoba
- Universidad Nacional de La Pampa
- Universidad Nacional de La Plata
- Universidad Nacional del Litoral
- Universidad de Lomas de Zamora
- Universidad Nacional de Mar del Plata
- Universidad Nacional de Quilmes
- Universidad Nacional de Río Cuarto
- Universidad Nacional de Río Negro
- Universidad Nacional de San Luis
- Universidad Nacional de General San Martín
- Universidad Nacional de Villa María
- Universidad Nacional de Entre Ríos
- Universidad Nacional de Tucumán

== See also ==
- Spanish as a Second Language
