= Most common words in Spanish =

Below are two estimates of the most common words in Modern Spanish. Each estimate comes from an analysis of a different text corpus. A text corpus is a large collection of samples of written and/or spoken language, that has been carefully prepared for linguistic analysis. To determine which words are the most common, researchers create a database of all the words found in the corpus, and categorized them based on the context in which they are used.

The first table lists the 100 most common word forms from the Corpus de Referencia del Español Actual (CREA), a text corpus compiled by the Real Academia Española (RAE). The RAE is Spain's official institution for documenting, planning, and standardising the Spanish language. A word form is any of the grammatical variations of a word.

The second table is a list of 100 most common lemmas found in a text corpus compiled by Mark Davies and other language researchers at Brigham Young University in the United States. A lemma is the primary form of a word—the one that would appear in a dictionary. The Spanish infinitive tener ("to have") is a lemma, while tiene ("has")—which is a conjugation of tener—is a word form.

== Real Academia Española ==
The list below comes from "1000 formas más frecuentes" (transl. 1000 most frequent word forms)", a list published by the Real Academia Española (RAE) from analysis of more than 160 million word forms found in the Corpus de Referencia del Español Actual (transl. Reference Corpus of Current Spanish), or CREA. CREA is a computerised corpus of texts written in Spanish, and of transcripts of spoken Spanish. It includes books, magazines, and newspapers with a wide variety of content, as well as transcripts of spoken language from radio and television broadcasts and other sources. All the works in the collection are from 1975 to 2004. CREA includes samples from all Spanish-speaking countries.

The list of "2000 most frequent word forms" comes from an analysis of CREA version 3.2. Plurals, verb conjugations, and other inflections are ranked separately. Homonyms, however, are not distinguished from one another. CREA 3.2 was published in June 2008.

Most frequent word forms out of ~160 million words (RAE 2008)
Rank	Word form	Occurrences	Part of speech	Translation
1	de	9,999,518	preposition	of; from
2	la	6,277,560	article, pronoun	the; third person feminine singular pronoun
3	que	4,681,839	conjunction	that, which
4	el	4,569,652	article	the
5	en	4,234,281	preposition	in, on
6	y	4,180,279	conjunction	and
7	a	3,260,939	preposition	to, at
8	los	2,618,657	article, pronoun	the; third person masculine direct object
9	se	2,022,514	pronoun	-self, oneself (reflexive)
10	del	1,857,225	contraction	from the
11	las	1,686,741	article, pronoun	the; third person feminine direct object
12	un	1,659,827	article	a, an
13	por	1,561,904	preposition	by, for, through
14	con	1,481,607	preposition	with
15	no	1,465,503	adverb	no; not
16	una	1,347,603	article	a, an, one
17	su	1,103,617	possessive	his/her/its/your
18	para	1,062,152	preposition	for, to, in order to
19	es	1,019,669	verb	is
20	al	951,054	contraction	to the
21	lo	866,955	article, pronoun	the; third person masculine direct object
22	como	773,465	conjunction	like, as
23	más	661,696	adjective	more
24	o	542,284	conjunction	or
25	pero	450,512	conjunction	but
26	sus	449,870	possessive	his/her/its/your
27	le	413,241	pronoun	third person indirect object
28	ha	380,339	verb	he/she/it has [done something]; you (formal) have [done something]
29	me	374,368	pronoun	me
30	si	327,480	conjunction	if, whether
31	sin	298,383	preposition	without
32	sobre	289,704	preposition	on top of, over, about
33	este	285,461	adjective	this
34	ya	274,177	adverb	already; still
35	entre	267,493	preposition	between
36	cuando	257,272	conjunction	when
37	todo	247,340	adjective	all, every
38	esta	238,841	adjective	this
39	ser	232,924	verb	to be
40	son	232,415	verb	they are, you (pl.) are
41	dos	228,439	number	two
42	también	227,411	adverb	too, also, as well
43	fue	223,791	verb	was
44	había	223,430	verb	I/he/she/it/there was (or used to be)
45	era	219,933	verb	was
46	muy	208,540	adverb	very
47	años	203,027	noun (masculine)	years
48	hasta	202,935	preposition	until
49	desde	198,647	preposition	from; since
50	está	194,168	verb	is
51	mi	186,360	possessive	my
52	porque	185,700	conjunction	because
53	qué	184,956	pronoun	what?; which?; how adjective
54	sólo	170,552	adverb	only, solely
55	han	169,718	verb	they/you (pl.) have [done something]
56	yo	167,684	pronoun	I
57	hay	164,940	verb	there is/are
58	vez	163,538	noun (feminine)	time, instance
59	puede	161,219	verb	can
60	todos	158,168	adjective	all; every
61	así	155,645	adverb	like that
62	nos	154,412	pronoun	us
63	ni	153,451	conjunction, adverb	neither; nor; no even
64	parte	148,750	noun (masculine / feminine)	part; message
65	tiene	147,274	verb	has
66	él	139,080	pronoun (masculine)	he, it
67	uno	136,020	number	one
68	donde	132,077	preposition	where
69	bien	130,957	adjective	fine, well
70	tiempo	130,896	noun (masculine)	time; weather
71	mismo	130,746	adjective	same
72	ese	127,976	pronoun	that
73	ahora	125,661	adverb	now
74	cada	124,558	determiner	each; every
75	e	123,729	conjunction	and
76	vida	123,491	noun (feminine)	life
77	otro	121,983	adjective	other, another
78	después	121,746	preposition	after
79	te	120,052	pronoun	to you, for you; yourself
80	otros	119,500	pronoun	others
81	aunque	115,556	conjunction	though, although, even though
82	esa	115,377	adjective	that
83	eso	114,523	pronoun	that
84	hace	114,507	verb	he/she/it does/makes
85	otra	113,982	adjective, pronoun	other; another
86	gobierno	113,011	noun (masculine)	government
87	tan	112,471	adverb	so
88	durante	112,020	preposition	during
89	siempre	111,557	adverb	always
90	día	110,921	noun (masculine)	day
91	tanto	110,679	adjective, adverb	so much
92	ella	110,620	pronoun	she, her; it
93	tres	109,542	number	three
94	sí	108,631	noun, pronoun	yes, if; reflexive pronoun
95	dijo	108,471	verb	said; told
96	sido	107,352	past participle	been
97	gran	106,991	adjective	large, great, big
98	país	104,568	noun (masculine)	country
99	según	104,204	preposition	as; according to
100	menos	103,498	adjective	less; fewer

== Mark Davies ==
In 2006, Mark Davies, an associate professor of linguistics at Brigham Young University, published his estimate of the 5000 most common words in Modern Spanish. To make this list, he compiled samples only from 20th-century sources—especially from the years 1970 to 2000. Most of the sources are from the 1990s. Of the 20 million words in the corpus, about one-third (~6,750,000 words) come from transcripts of spoken Spanish: conversations, interviews, lectures, sermons, press conferences, sports broadcasts, and so on. Among the written sources are novels, plays, short stories, letters, essays, newspapers, and the encyclopedia Encarta. The samples, written and spoken, come from Spain and at least 10 Latin American countries. Most of the samples were previously compiled for the Corpus del Español (2001), a 100 million-word corpus that includes works from the 13th century through the 20th.

The 5000 words in Davies' list are lemmas. A lemma is the form of the word as it would appear in a dictionary. Singular nouns and plurals, for example, are treated as the same word, as are infinitives and verb conjugations. The table below includes the top 100 words from Davies' list of 5000. This list distinguishes between the definite articles lo and la and the pronouns lo and la; all are ranked individually. The adjectives ese and esa are ranked together (as are este and esta) ), but the pronoun eso is separate. All conjugations of a verb are ranked together.

A highlighted row indicates that the word was found to occur especially frequently in samples of spoken Spanish.

Most frequent lemmas out of ~20 million words (Davies 2006)
Rank	Lemma	Occurrences	Part of speech	Translation
1	el / la	2,037,803	article	the
2	de	1,319,834	preposition	of, from
3	que	662,653	conjunction	that, which
4	y	562,162	conjunction	and
5	a	529,899	preposition	to, at
6	en	507,233	preposition	in, on
7	un	434,022	article	a, an
8	ser	374,194	verb	to be
9	se	329,012	pronoun	-self, oneself (reflexive)
10	no	257,365	adverb	no
11	haber	196,962	verb	to have
12	por	190,975	preposition	by, for, through
13	con	184,597	preposition	with
14	su	187,810	adjective	his, her, their, your
15	para	126,061	preposition	for, to, in order to
16	como	106,840	conjunction	like, as
17	estar	106,429	verb	to be
18	tener	106,642	verb	to have
19	le	98,211	pronoun	third person indirect object
20	lo	91,035	article	the
21	lo	92,519	pronoun	third person masculine direct object
22	todo	88,057	adjective	all, every
23	pero	82,435	conjunction	but, yet, except
24	más	92,352	adjective	more
25	hacer	81,619	verb	to do; to make
26	o	82,444	conjunction	or
27	poder	76,738	verb	to be able to, can
28	decir	79,343	verb	to tell, say
29	este / esta	80,544	adjective	this
30	ir	70,352	verb	to go
31	otro	61,726	adjective	other, another
32	ese / esa	60,989	adjective	that
33	la	55,523	pronoun	third person feminine direct object
34	si	53,608	conjunction	if, whether
35	me	95,577	pronoun	me
36	ya	46,778	adverb	already, still
37	ver	45,854	verb	to see
38	porque	44,500	conjunction	because
39	dar	40,233	verb	to give
40	cuando	39,726	conjunction	when
41	él	38,597	pronoun	he
42	muy	39,558	adverb	very, really
43	sin	40,432	preposition	without
44	vez	35,286	noun (feminine)	time, occurrence
45	mucho	36,391	adjective	much, many, a lot
46	saber	37,092	verb	to know
47	qué	42,000	pronoun	what?; which?; how adjective
48	sobre	35,038	preposition	on top of, over, about
49	mi	45,636	adjective	my
50	alguno	30,485	adjective / pronoun	some; someone
51	mismo	29,569	adjective	same
52	yo	54,635	pronoun	I
53	también	33,348	adverb	also
54	hasta	29,506	preposition / adverb	until, up to; even
55	año	33,053	noun (masculine)	year
56	dos	27,733	number	two
57	querer	28,696	verb	to want, love
58	entre	30,756	preposition	between
59	así	24,832	adverb	like that
60	primero	26,553	adjective	first
61	desde	25,288	preposition	from, since
62	grande	25,963	adjective	large, great, big
63	eso	31,636	pronoun (neuter gender)	that
64	ni	24,261	conjunction	not even, neither, nor
65	nos	26,349	pronoun	us
66	llegar	22,878	verb	to arrive
67	pasar	22,466	verb	to pass; to happen; to spend time
68	tiempo	22,432	noun (masculine)	time, weather
69	ella(s)	24,770	pronoun	she; (plural) them
70	sí	33,828	adverb	yes
71	día	24,715	noun (masculine)	day
72	uno	21,407	number	one
73	bien	21,589	adverb	well
74	poco	20,986	adjective / adverb	little, few; a little bit
75	deber	22,232	verb	should, ought to; to owe
76	entonces	23,548	adverb	so, then
77	poner	20,330	verb	to put (on); to get [adjective]
78	cosa	23,943	noun (feminine)	thing
79	tanto	20,531	adjective	much
80	hombre	20,292	noun (masculine)	man, mankind, husband
81	parecer	19,964	verb	to seem, to look like
82	nuestro	20,666	adjective	our
83	tan	19,002	adverb	such, a, too, so
84	donde	18,852	conjunction	where
85	ahora	21,030	adverb	now
86	parte	20,319	noun (feminine)	part, portion
87	después	20,229	adverb	after
88	vida	18,045	noun (feminine)	life
89	quedar	18,152	verb	to remain, to stay
90	siempre	17,689	adverb	always
91	creer	21,257	verb	to believe
92	hablar	19,006	verb	to speak, to talk
93	llevar	17,062	verb	to take, to carry
94	dejar	18,185	verb	to let, to leave
95	nada	19,365	pronoun	nothing
96	cada	17,155	adjective	each, every
97	seguir	16,104	verb	to follow
98	menos	15,527	adjective	less, fewer
99	nuevo	17,381	adjective	new
100	encontrar	15,556	verb	to find

== See also ==
- Longest word in Spanish
- List of English–Spanish interlingual homographs
- Most common words in English
- Word lists by frequency
- Letter frequency
- Morphology (linguistics)
