= Escuela Oficial de Idiomas =

Network of language schools in Spain

Official School of Languages
- Spanish: Escuela Oficial de Idiomas
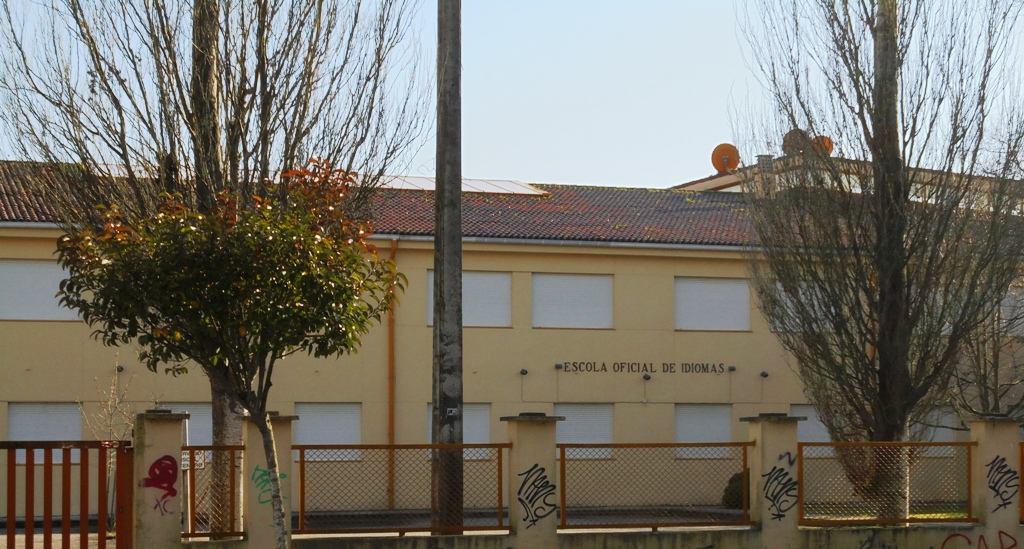
- Façade of the Official School of Languages in Pontevedra

Information
- Former name: Escuela Central de Idiomas
- Established: 1911; 115 years ago

The Escuelas Oficiales de Idiomas (EOI) (English: Official School of Languages) are a nationwide network of publicly funded language schools in Spain that are found in most substantial towns. They are dedicated to the specialized teaching of modern languages, not just Spanish as a second or foreign language but any modern language for which there is a significant demand. The EOIs are centers that are both funded and managed by the regional education authorities of the various Autonomous communities of Spain, and they are framed within the non-university special regime, which facilitates subsidized or grant-assisted access and support to suitable candidates.

Foreign students of all levels of competence are welcome, and may enroll locally at the advertised times (usually in September). However, to ensure suitable placement, prospective students are often required to provide documentary evidence of their level of educational achievement. This should ordinarily be a certificate recognized in their country of origin, but in exceptional cases, a testimonial from a former teacher can be sufficient.

== History ==
The first school opened in Madrid in 1911 under the name Escuela Central de Idiomas, which from the outset included English, French, and German in its curriculum. In the 1911 enrollment appear the names of several notable people including Maria de Maeztu Whitney, Claudio Sánchez-Albornoz and Carmen de Burgos. The study of the Spanish language for foreigners and the teaching of Moroccan Arabic were introduced the following year. Soon afterwards Italian, Portuguese and Esperanto were added.

This first school was located in a ducal property owned by the Countess of Medina and Torres, No. 3 in Cuesta de Santo Domingo street. The then-Ministry of Public Instruction paid the Countess six thousand pesetas for rent, which corresponds to approximately 20,000 Euros in early 21st century spending power.

Although the school had roughly equal numbers of male and female students in its earliest years, after about 1918, the number of women enrolled began to consistently exceed that of men. It is also noteworthy there were no examination standards until the end of the fourth year.

During the dictatorship of Primo de Rivera the school was attached to the Complutense University of Madrid, and during the civil war, classes were suspended. In 1957, the introduction of Russian language courses into the school took place. The Russian teacher at that time recounted that during the first years, there would usually be a secret policeman present in her classes, who left about a month after starting the course.

The new regime of enseñanza libre was introduced in 1960, meaning that students no longer had to start with the beginner's class, but were rather given the opportunity to prove their pre-existing knowledge in order to immediately access classes of a higher competence level. This measure contributed to further growth in student numbers, with the number of teachers being more than doubled in 1964.

Due to the high demand, three new schools in Barcelona, Valencia and Bilbao were created in September 1964. They respectively were opened from 1966 to 1971. These schools were all called Escuelas Oficiales de Idiomas, marking the birth date of the nationwide EOI network.

In 1965, Chinese was introduced. In 1968, four other Schools were created in Alicante, A Coruña, Málaga and Zaragoza. From the 1970s onwards, other languages of Spain were added, such as Catalan, Valencian, Basque, and Galician. In 1982, four more Schools were created in Burgos, Ciudad Real, Murcia and Salamanca, bringing the total number of establishments up to twelve.

Following the restoration of democracy in 1978, the direction of the individual "EOIs" was transferred to the various departments of education of their respective autonomous communities, which expanded and developed the service according to their different regional needs and policies, with only a loose national framework in place. It has been argued that inconsistent standards caused by this arrangement have led to EOI certificates becoming less competitive next to private and international institutes. Nevertheless, the network grew substantially in the following decades, and as of 2020 consists of more than 300 Escuelas Oficiales and Aulas adscritas.

== Regulation ==
In Spain, studies of the Official Language School (EE.OO.II.), are regulated by Organic Law 2/2006 of Education, Royal Decree 806/2006 of 30 June, establishing the calendar Application of the new organization of the education system and Royal Decree 1629/2006, of 29 December, by fixing the basics of teaching curriculum of specialized language regulated by Organic Law 2/2006, of May 3, Education. This standard replaces the previous (BOE of 10 September, Sorting corresponding to the first level of the specialized language), by Royal Decree 1523/1989 of 1 December (BOE of 18 December, Content first Minimum level of Foreign Language Teaching Specialist) and by Royal Decree 47/1992 (minimum content of the first level of the Spanish languages). They stated that each language studies were divided into two cycles:

  - Elemental Cycle (3 courses, minimum 120 hours each).
  - Superior Cycle (2 courses, 120 hours minimum each).

The Organic Law 2/2006 on Education (LOE) modifies this situation, adapting to the current scheme of three levels:

  - Basic level (equivalent to A2 of the Common European Framework of Reference)
  - Intermediate (equivalent to B1 of the Common European Framework of Reference)
  - Advanced Level (equivalent to B2 of the Common European Framework of Reference )

In practice, some regions (Andalusia, Catalonia and Navarra) have created curricula of five years to impart the teachings of the three levels while others have opted Communities plans six years, with two years at each level. The same law equates the old certificate with the Elemental Cycle Intermediate Certificate and Certificate of Proficiency old with the new Advanced Level Certificate.

Some regions, such as La Rioja and the Balearic Islands, have also implemented levels C1 and C2 in some languages.

Names of levels might change following the recently passed Organic Law of Education LOMCE. Schools all over Spain follow in their curricula the descriptions given by the CEFR and teach from A1 to B2 or up to C1 or C2.

== Number of EOIs ==
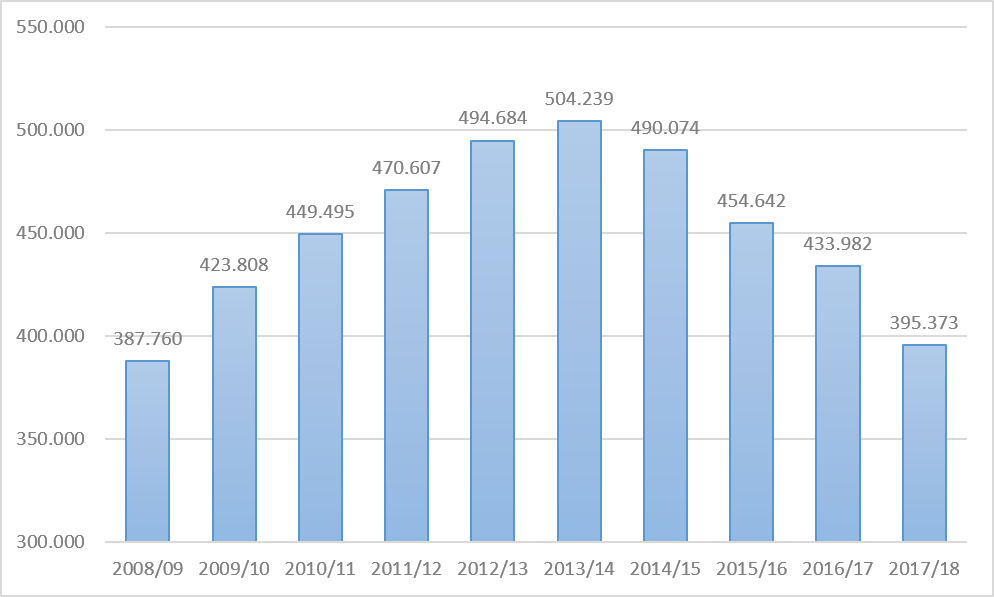
Evolution of student numbers in Spanish EOIs from course 2008/09 to course 2017/18.

The schools are dependent on each Autonomous Community. The number of schools in each community as of 2020 is as follows:

- Andalucía (52)
- Aragón (12)
- Asturias (8)
- Cantabria (3)
- Castilla-La Mancha (13 with 4 extensions)
- Castilla y León (14)
- Catalonia (45)
- Ceuta and Melilla (1 each)
- Extremadura (9)
- Galicia (11)
- Madrid (30 with 5 extensions)
- Murcia (5 with 3 extensions)
- Navarra (3)
- Valencia (24)
- Balearic Islands (6 with 3 extensions)
- Canary Islands (22)
- País Vasco (15)
- La Rioja (3 with 4 extensions)

== Prerequisites ==
The prerequisite to enter an EOI is to have completed the first of the two cycles of secondary education in Spain or the equivalent abroad. Spain is the only country in the European Union offering this kind of public education and issues official certificates for it.

== Subjects ==
The 22 languages (Note: This list includes all languages covered by the Real Decreto 1629/2006 of 4 January 2007. Individual schools are however free to offer additional languages, like the EOI Barcelona Drassanes.) offered vary according to school size. Many small schools only have courses in English, French and German, though Italian and Portuguese are also frequently offered. Regional languages like Catalan or Galician are usually only taught in their respective communities.

- Arabic
- Catalan
- Chinese
- Danish
- Dutch
- English (North-American and British)
- Euskera
- Finnish
- French
- Galician
- German
- Greek
- Irish
- Italian
- Japanese
- Korean
- Polish
- Portuguese
- Romanian
- Russian
- Spanish for foreigners
- Swedish

Some EOI offer also summer courses and programs specialized in translation, writing, business or law.

== Bibliography ==
- Cuenca Ballesteros, Pedro (2017). La Ley Moyano y las Escuelas Oficiales de Idiomas (in Spanish). Zaragoza: Universidad de Zaragoza. ISBN 978-84-16935-01-7.
- Nistal Ramón, Teresa; Yuste López, Noemí (2016). Fondos de la Escuela Central de Idiomas en el Archivo Central de la Secretaría de Estado de Educación (1945-1970) (PDF) (in Spanish). Archivo Central de la Secretaría de Estado de Educación. Archived from the original (PDF) on 2020-07-21.
- Rodríguez Rubio, Raquel Eugenia (2016). Historia de las Escuelas Oficiales de Idiomas bajo el prisma de su legislación (Thesis) (in Spanish). Universidad de Alcalá.
