= Interlingual homograph =

Word with different meaning in different languages

An interlingual homograph is a word that occurs in more than one written language, but which has a different meaning or pronunciation in each language. For example the word "done" is an adjective in English (pronounced /dʌn/), a verb in Spanish (present subjunctive form of donar) and a noun in Czech (vocative singular form of don, pronounced /ˈdonɛ/).

A homograph is a word that is written the same as another word, but which (usually) has a different meaning. Interlingual means "spanning multiple languages". In some cases, the identical spelling of a word in two languages is coincidental; in other cases, it is because they descend from the same ancestor word. Words that come from the same ancestor are called cognates.

Another way of describing interlingual homographs is to say that they are orthographically identical, since a language's orthography describes the rules for writing the language: spelling, diacritics, capitalization, hyphenation, word dividers, etc.

== See also ==
- Heterography and homography – Distinct words with identical written forms
- Homoglyph – Different glyphs which are visually similar
- Homograph – Distinct words with identical written forms
- List of English–Spanish interlingual homographs
- Polysemy – Capacity for a sign to have multiple related meanings
- Translingualism – Aspects relevant across several languages
