= Longest word in Romanian =

Longest word of the Romanian language

The longest word in the Romanian language is pneumonoultramicroscopicsilicovolcaniconioză, the long name of silicoză (silicosis). It consists of 44 letters and refers to a chronic respiratory disease. Its name in the English language is pneumonoultramicroscopicsilicovolcanoconiosis, which is itself the longest English word registered in a major English dictionary. Nevertheless, neither this word nor several subsequent Romanian longest words are recognized by the Dicționarul explicativ al limbii române ("Explanatory Dictionary of the Romanian Language", DEX). Instead, the longest word collected by the DEX is electroglotospectrografie, which is a medical stabilization method, has 25 letters and comes from the French word électroglottospectrographie.

The list of the longest Romanian words is the following:

- Pneumonoultramicroscopicsilicovolcaniconioză − 44 letters, the silicosis disease, not admitted by the DEX.
- Difosfopiridinnucleotidpirofosfatază − 36 letters, an enzyme, not admitted by the DEX.
- Encefalomielopoliradiculonevrită − 32 letters, a type of neuritis, not admitted by the DEX.
- Gastropiloroduodenojejunostomie − 31 letters, a kind of surgical operation, not admitted by the DEX.
- Diclordifeniltriclormetilmetan − 30 letters, a chemical substance, not admitted by the DEX.
- Electroglotospectrografie − 25 letters, a medical stabilization method, admitted by the DEX.

The following longest Romanian words are mostly made up of words with 23 or 21 letters.

There are also other Romanian words that break other records within the language. The longest word that can be formed with only two vowels is uiuiu (an interjection) and the longest one that uses all vowels including the ones with diacritics is autoînsămânțările. Both are registered in the DEX.

== See also ==
- Longest words
- Longest word in English
- Longest word in French
- Longest word in Spanish
- Longest word in Turkish
