= False friend =

Words in two languages that sound similar but have very different meanings

An example of false friends in German and English

In linguistics, a false friend is a word in a different language that looks or sounds similar to a word in a given language, but differs significantly in meaning. Examples of false friends include English embarrassed and Spanish embarazada ('pregnant'); English parents versus Portuguese parentes and Italian parenti (the latter two both meaning 'relatives'); English demand and French demander ('ask'); and English gift, German Gift ('poison'), and Norwegian gift (both 'married' and 'poison').

The term was introduced by a French book, Les Faux Amis : ou, Les Trahisons du vocabulaire anglais (False friends: or, the betrayals of English vocabulary), published in 1928.

As well as producing completely false friends, the use of loanwords often results in the use of a word in a restricted context, which may then develop new meanings not found in the original language. For example, Angst means 'fear' in a general sense (as well as 'anxiety') in German, but when it was borrowed into English in the context of psychology, its meaning was restricted to a particular type of fear described as "a neurotic feeling of anxiety and depression". Also, gymnasium meant both 'a place of education' and 'a place for exercise' in Latin, but its meaning became restricted to the former in German and to the latter in English, making the expressions into false friends in those languages as well as in Ancient Greek, where it started out as 'a place for naked exercise'.

== Definition and origin ==
False friend words are bilingual homophones or bilingual homographs, i.e., words in two or more languages that look similar (homographs) or sound similar (homophones), but differ significantly in meaning. False friend letters are homographic graphemes (written characters) that differ significantly in pronunciation.

The origin of the term is as a shortened version of the expression 'false friend of a translator', the English translation of a French expression (French: faux amis du traducteur) introduced by Maxime Kœssler and Jules Derocquigny in their 1928 book, with a sequel, Autres Mots anglais perfides.

== Causes ==
From the etymological point of view, false friends can be created in several ways.

=== Shared etymology ===
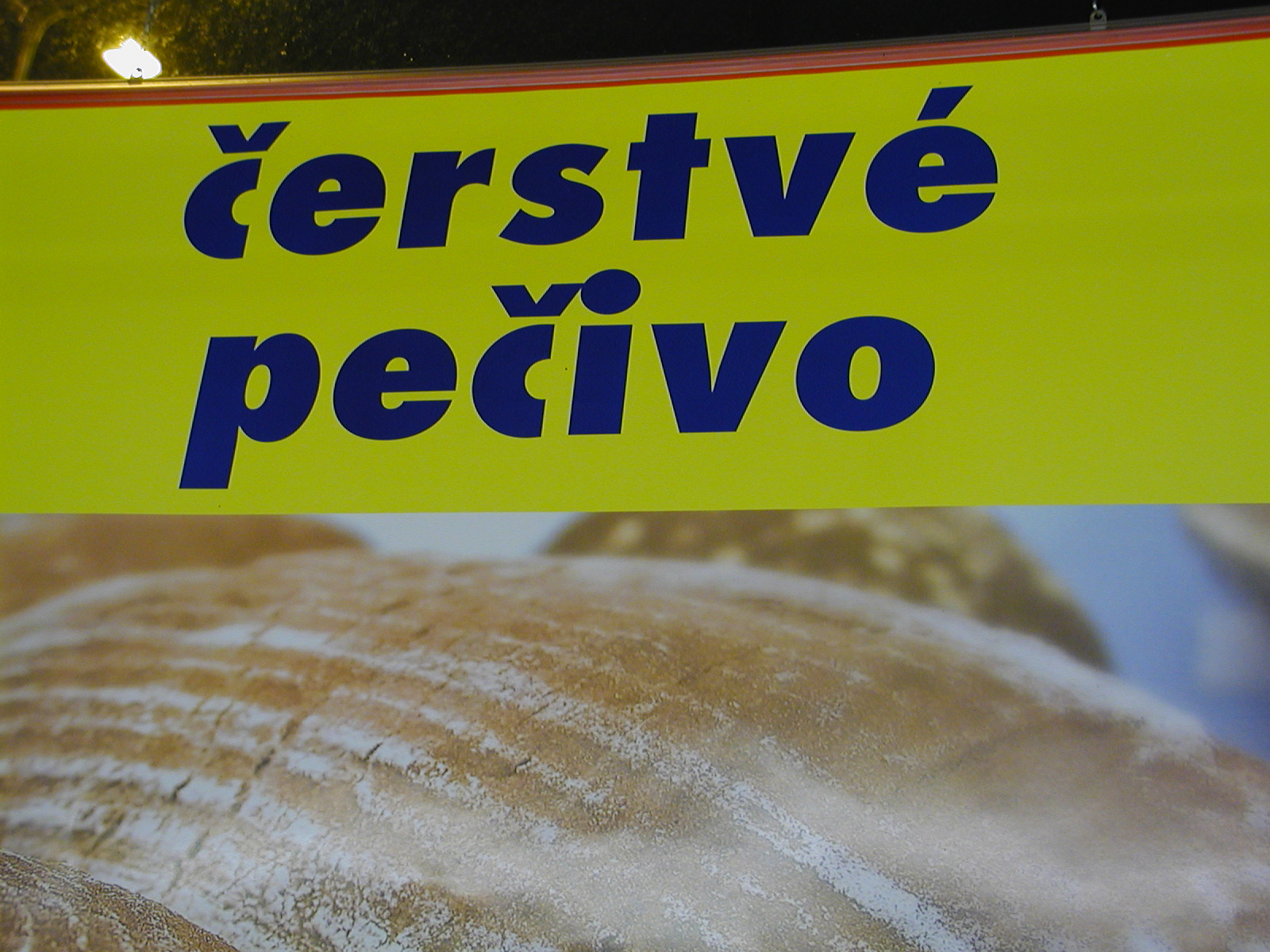
An example of a West Slavic shared etymology. In Czech and Slovak, čerstvé pečivo means 'fresh baked goods', in Polish, czerstwe pieczywo means 'stale bread', in Ukrainian, черстве печиво (čerstve pečyvo) means 'hardened cookie (bakery)', and in Russian, chyorstvy means "stale" again.

If language A borrowed a word from language B, or both borrowed the word from a third language or inherited it from a common ancestor, and later the word shifted in meaning or acquired additional meanings in at least one of these languages, a native speaker of one language will face a false friend when learning the other. Sometimes, presumably both senses were present in the common ancestor language, but the cognate words took on different restricted senses in Language A and Language B.

==== In loanwords ====
Actual, which in English is usually a synonym of real, has a different meaning in other European languages, in which it means 'current' or 'up-to-date', and has the logical derivative as a verb, meaning 'to make current' or 'to update'. Actualise (or actualize) in English means 'to make a reality of'.

The Italian word confetti ('sugared almonds') has acquired a new meaning in English, French and Dutch; in Italian, the corresponding word is coriandoli.

English and Spanish, both of which have borrowed from Ancient Greek and Latin, have multiple false friends, such as:

English	Spanish translation	Spanish	English translation
actually	en realidad	actualmente	currently
advertisement	publicidad	advertencia	warning
bizarre	extraño	bizarro	brave

English and Japanese also have diverse false friends, many of them being wasei-eigo and gairaigo words.

==== In native words ====
The word friend itself has cognates in the other Germanic languages, but the Scandinavian ones (like Swedish frände, Danish frænde) predominantly mean 'relative'. The original Proto-Germanic word meant simply 'someone whom one cares for' and could therefore refer to both a friend and a relative, but it lost various degrees of the 'friend' sense in the Scandinavian languages, while it mostly lost the sense of 'relative' in English (the plural friends is still, rarely, used for 'kinsfolk', as in the Scottish proverb Friends agree best at a distance, quoted in 1721).

The Estonian and Finnish languages are related, which gives rise to false friends such as swapped forms for south and south-west:

Estonian	Finnish	English
lõuna	etelä	south
edel	lounas	south-west

Or Estonian vaim ('spirit' or 'ghost') and Finnish vaimo ('wife'); or Estonian koristaja ('a cleaner') and Finnish koristaja ('a decorator').

A high level of lexical similarity exists between German and Dutch, but shifts in meaning of words with a shared etymology have in some instances resulted in 'bi-directional false friends':

German	Dutch	English
See	meer	mere (lake)
Meer	zee	sea

Note that the Low German die See means 'sea', and thus is not a false friend.

German	Dutch	English
mögen	houden van	like
dürfen	mogen	be allowed to
wagen	durven	dare

The meanings could diverge significantly. For example, the Proto-Malayo-Polynesian word *qayam ('domesticated animal') became specialized in descendant languages: Malay/Indonesian ayam ('chicken'), Cebuano ayam ('dog'), and Gaddang ayam ('pig').

=== Homonyms ===
In Swedish, the word rolig means 'fun': ett roligt skämt 'a funny joke', while in the closely related languages Danish and Norwegian it means 'calm' (as in 'he was calm despite all the commotion around him'). However, the Swedish original meaning of 'calm' is retained in some related words such as ro 'calmness', and orolig 'worrisome, anxious', literally 'un-calm'. The Danish and Norwegian word semester means term (as in school term), but the Swedish word semester means holiday. The Danish word frokost means lunch, while the Norwegian word frokost and the Swedish word frukost both mean breakfast.

=== Pseudo-anglicisms ===
Pseudo-anglicisms are new words formed from English morphemes independently from an analogous English construct and with a different intended meaning.

Japanese is notable for its pseudo-anglicisms, known as wasei-eigo ('Japan-made English').

== Semantic change ==
In bilingual situations, false friends often result in a semantic change—a real new meaning that is then commonly used in a language. For example, the Portuguese humoroso ('capricious') changed its meaning in American Portuguese to 'humorous', owing to the English surface-cognate humorous.

The American Italian fattoria lost its original meaning, 'farm', in favor of 'factory', owing to the phonetically similar surface-cognate English factory (cf. Standard Italian fabbrica, 'factory'). Instead of the original fattoria, the phonetic adaptation American Italian farma became the new signifier for 'farm' (Weinreich 1963: 49; see 'one-to-one correlation between signifiers and referents').

Due to the closeness between Italian terra rossa ('red soil') and Portuguese terra roxa 'purple soil', Italian farmers in Brazil used terra roxa to describe a type of soil similar to the red Mediterranean soil. The actual Portuguese word for 'red' is vermelha. Nevertheless, terra roxa and terra vermelha are still used interchangeably in Brazilian agriculture.

Quebec French is also known for shifting the meanings of some words toward those of their English cognates, but such words are considered false friends in European French. For example, éventuellement is commonly used as 'eventually' in Quebec but means 'perhaps' in Europe.

This phenomenon is analyzed by Ghil'ad Zuckermann as '(incestuous) phono-semantic matching'.

== See also ==
- Auto-antonym
- Dunglish
- Equivalence in language translation
- Etymological fallacy
- False cognate
- False etymology
- Folk etymology
- Linguistic interference (language transfer)
- List of Chinese–Japanese false friends
- Spanglish
- Swenglish
