= Longest word in Spanish =

This article describes some of the longest words in the Spanish language.

esternocleidooccipitomastoideos (31 letters) is the plural of the noun esternocleidooccipitomastoideo, which is the sternocleidomastoid, a muscle in the human neck. The word has a 22-letter synonym: esternocleidomastoideo, which is shorter because it omits the Latin prefix occipito- ('occipital'). Both words are abbreviated as ECOM.

The 24-letter word electroencefalografistas, plural of electroencefalografista, means 'electroencephalographists' or 'electroencephalographers': specialists in the brain measurement technology of electroencephalography (EEG).

The 23-letter adverb anticonstitucionalmente means 'anticonstitutionally'. Anticonstitucionalmente is also the Portuguese translation; the French translation, anticonstitutionnellement, is an exceptionally long word as well (25 letters).

== Long words ==
In the table below, all of the Spanish nouns except for arteriosclerosis can be pluralised by adding an s (es for internacionalizaciones) to the end. The adjective otorrinolaringológico can also be pluralised with an s; the plurals of the other adjectives end in es.

The RAE column indicates whether the Real Academia Española lists and defines the word in the Diccionario de la lengua española, its official dictionary.

Word	Letters	Syllables	Part of speech	Translation	RAE	Ref.
hipopotomonstrosesquipedaliofobia	33	13	noun	hippopotomonstrosesquipedaliophobia	No	
esternocleidooccipitomastoideo	30	13	noun	sternocleidomastoid	No	
hexakosioihexekontahexafobia	28	10	noun	hexakosioihexekontahexaphobia	No	
anticonstitucionalmente	23	9	adverb	anticonstitutionally	No	
electroencefalografista	23	10	noun	electroencephalographer	Yes	
esternocleidomastoideo	22	9	noun	sternocleidomastoid	Yes	
electroencefalografía	21	10	noun	electroencephalography	Yes	
otorrinolaringológico	21	10	adjective	otorhinolaryngological	Yes	
internacionalización	20	8	noun	internationalization	Yes	
electroencefalograma	20	9	noun	electroencephalogram	Yes	
otorrinolaringología	20	10	noun	otorhinolaryngology	Yes	
electrocardiografía	19	9	noun	electrocardiography	Yes	
desafortunadamente	18	8	adverb	unfortunately	Yes	
anticonstitucional	18	7	adjective	anticonstitutional	Yes	
desconsoladamente	17	7	adverb	disconsolately	Yes	
interculturalidad	17	7	noun	interculturality	Yes	
arteriosclerosis	16	6	noun	arteriosclerosis	Yes	
electrodoméstico	16	7	noun	home appliance	Yes	
inconstitucional	16	6	adjective	unconstitutional	Yes	
limpiaparabrisas	16	7	noun	windshield wiper	Yes	
inexorablemente	15	7	adverb	inexorably	Yes	
lamentablemente	15	6	noun	unfortunately	Yes	
paralelepípedo	14	7	noun	parallelepiped	Yes	

== See also ==
- Longest words
- Longest word in English
- Longest word in French
- Longest word in Romanian
- Longest word in Turkish
- Cognate
- List of English–Spanish interlingual homographs
- Most common words in Spanish
