= Longest word in Turkish =

Word in the Turkish language

As an agglutinative language, Turkish allows the construction of words by adding many suffixes to a word stem. The longest word in the Turkish language used in a text is muvaffakiyetsizleştiricileştiriveremeyebileceklerimizdenmişsinizcesine which has 70 letters. It is derived from the noun muvaffakiyet ('success') and means 'as though you are from those whom we may not be able to easily make into a maker of unsuccessful ones'. It was used in a contrived story designed to use this word.

Not considering suffixes, the longest Turkish dictionary words have 20 letters: kuyruksallayangiller (the biological family Motacillidae), ademimerkeziyetçilik ('decentralization') and elektroensefalografi ('electroencephalography'). In comparison, the word muvaffakiyet has 12 letters, so it should be possible to use various other suffixes to make an even longer word from these ones. Therefore, -sizleştiricileştiriveremeyebileceklerimizdenmişsinizcesine can be added as a suffix to any meaningful Turkish noun. For example, ademimerkeziyetçiliksizleştiricileştiriveremeyebileceklerimizdenmişsinizcesinedir is another possible longest meaningful word in Turkish with 81 letters, which means 'as though you are from those whom we may not be able to easily make into a maker of decentralizationless ones'.

There is no principled grammatical reason for not being able to make a Turkish word indefinitely long, as there are suffixes that can act recursively on a word stem. In practice, however, such words would become unintelligible after a few cycles of recursion.

== Grammar ==
Turkish grammar is highly agglutinative, enabling the construction of words by stringing together various morphemes. It is theoretically possible for some words to be inflected an infinite number of times because certain suffixes generate words of the same type as the stem word, such that the new word can be modified again with the same suffix(es). An example for such a recursive pattern is:

ev-de-ki-nin-ki-ler-de-ki . . .
house-LOC-REL-POS3s-REL-PLU-LOC-REL . .
... the one of the one in the one at the house.

Thus, case and possessive suffixes interspersed with the -ki- suffix can be added indefinitely to a noun, although in practice this would not be observed more than a few times.

The causative morpheme can also be used recursively to generate indefinitely long words that are grammatically valid. This morpheme shows quite some irregularity, but its regular form is -DIr, where -D- is either -t- (after a voiceless consonant) or -d- (otherwise), and -I- is one of -ı-, -i-, -u- or -ü- (depending on vowel harmony).

Turkish	Literal gloss	Natural gloss
piş-ir-di-ler	they cooked it	
piş-ir-t-ti-ler	they caused it to be cooked	they had it cooked
piş-ir-t-tir-di-ler	they caused it to be caused to be cooked	they had someone have it cooked
piş-ir-t-tir-t-ti-ler	they caused it to be caused to be caused to be cooked	they had someone have someone have it cooked
piş-ir-t-tir-t-tir-di-ler	they caused it to be caused to be caused to be caused to be cooked	they had someone have someone have someone have it cooked

Multiple uses of this suffix are rare, but there is no theoretical limit.

== History ==
The tongue twister Çekoslovakyalılaştıramadıklarımızdan mısınız is often said to be the longest word in Turkish, despite in written form appearing to be two separate words. This is because the question particle mi is by convention separated from the verb, despite being considered part of it. It means 'are you one of those people whom we could not make to be Czechoslovak?' A slight modification, Çekoslovakyalılaştıramadıklarımızdanmışsınız, (43 letters; 'you are reportedly one of those that we could not make Czechoslovak') is, however, even longer and, as it contains no question particle, it is written contiguously.

After the dissolution of Czechoslovakia, Afyonkarahisarlılaştırabildiklerimizdenmişsinizcesine (53 letters) was often said to be the longest word in Turkish. It means 'as if you are one of the people that we made to be originating from Afyonkarahisar'. After the publication of longer words in popular media, it lost its popularity.

=== Muvaffakiyetsizleştiricileştiriveremeyebileceklerimizdenmişsinizcesine ===
The word muvaffakiyetsizleştiricileştiriveremeyebileceklerimizdenmişsinizcesine (70 letters) was proposed by Köksal Karakuş as the longest word in Turkish. Its use is illustrated by the following situation:

Kötü amaçların güdüldüğü bir öğretmen okulundayız. Yetiştirilen öğretmenlere öğrencileri nasıl muvaffakiyetsizleştirecekleri öğretiliyor. Yani öğretmenler birer muvaffakiyetsizleştirici olarak yetiştiriliyorlar. Fakat öğretmenlerden biri muvaffakiyetsizleştirici olmayı, yani muvaffakiyetsizleştiricileştirilmeyi reddediyor, bu konuda ileri geri konuşuyor. Bütün öğretmenleri kolayca muvaffakiyetsizleştiricileştiriverebileceğini düşünen okul müdürü bu duruma sinirleniyor, ve söz konusu öğretmeni makamına çağırıp ona diyor ki:
"Muvaffakiyetsizleştiricileştiriveremeyebileceklerimizdenmişsinizcesine laflar ediyormuşsunuz ha?"

We are in a teachers' training school that has evil purposes. The teachers who are being educated in that school are being taught how to make unsuccessful ones from students. So, one by one, teachers are being educated as makers of unsuccessful ones. However, one of those teachers refuses to be maker-of-unsuccessful-ones, in other words, to be made a maker-of-unsuccessful-ones; he talks about and criticizes the school's stand on the issue. The headmaster who thinks every teacher can be made easily into a maker-of-unsuccessful-ones gets angry. He invites the teacher to his room and says:
"You are talking as if you were one of those we can not easily turn into a maker-of-unsuccessful-ones, right?"

=== Word formation ===
Turkish	English
Muvaffak	Successful
Muvaffakiyet	Success ('successfulness')
Muvaffakiyetsiz	Unsuccessful ('without success')
Muvaffakiyetsizleş(-mek)	(To) become unsuccessful
Muvaffakiyetsizleştir(-mek)	(To) make one unsuccessful
Muvaffakiyetsizleştirici	Maker of unsuccessful ones
Muvaffakiyetsizleştiricileş(-mek)	(To) become a maker of unsuccessful ones
Muvaffakiyetsizleştiricileştir(-mek)	(To) make one a maker of unsuccessful ones
Muvaffakiyetsizleştiricileştiriver(-mek)	(To) easily make one a maker of unsuccessful ones
Muvaffakiyetsizleştiricileştiriverebil(-mek)	(To) be able to make one easily a maker of unsuccessful ones
Muvaffakiyetsizleştiricileştiriveremeyebil(-mek)	Not (to) be able to make one easily a maker of unsuccessful ones
Muvaffakiyetsizleştiricileştiriveremeyebilecek	(S/he who) will not be able to make one easily a maker of unsuccessful ones
Muvaffakiyetsizleştiricileştiriveremeyebilecekler	Those who will not be able to make one easily a maker of unsuccessful ones
Muvaffakiyetsizleştiricileştiriveremeyebileceklerimiz	Those who we will not be able to make easily a maker of unsuccessful ones
Muvaffakiyetsizleştiricileştiriveremeyebileceklerimizden	From those whom we will not be able to easily make a maker of unsuccessful ones
Muvaffakiyetsizleştiricileştiriveremeyebileceklerimizdenmiş	(S/he) happens to be have been from among those whom we will not be able to easily make a maker of unsuccessful ones
Muvaffakiyetsizleştiricileştiriveremeyebileceklerimizdenmişsiniz	You happen to have been from among those whom we will not be able to easily make a maker of unsuccessful ones
Muvaffakiyetsizleştiricileştiriveremeyebileceklerimizdenmişsinizcesine	As though you happen to have been from among those whom we will not be able to easily make a maker of unsuccessful ones

== See also ==
- Agglutination
- Longest word in English
- Longest word in French
- Longest word in Romanian
- Longest word in Spanish
- Longest words
