= Mark Davies (linguist) =

American linguist (born 1963)

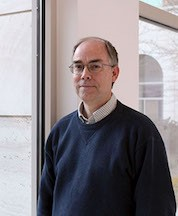
- Born: April 22, 1963 (age 63)
- Known for: Corpus linguistics, Historical linguistics, Syntactic change

Academic background
- Education: Brigham Young University (BA); Brigham Young University (MA); University of Texas, Austin (PhD)

Academic work
- Discipline: Corpus linguistics, historical linguistics, syntactic change
- Institutions: Illinois State University; Brigham Young University
- Website: mark-davies.org

Mark E. Davies (born 1963) is an American linguist. He specializes in corpus linguistics and language variation and change. He is the creator of most of the text corpora from English-Corpora.org (including the Corpus of Contemporary American English/ COCA) as well as the Corpus del español and the Corpus do português. He has also created large datasets of word frequency, collocates, and n-grams data, which have been used by many large companies in the fields of technology and also language learning.

Davies earned a bachelor's degree with a double major in linguistics and Spanish from Brigham Young University (BYU) in 1986, followed by an MA in Spanish linguistics from BYU in 1989. He earned his Ph.D. in Iberoromance philology and linguistics from the University of Texas at Austin in 1992. He has received several grants from the National Endowment for the Humanities and the National Science Foundation, to create and use corpora of English, Spanish, and Portuguese.

From 1992 to 2003, Davies was a professor of Spanish at Illinois State University. He was then a professor of linguistics at Brigham Young University from 2003 until his retirement in 2020. At BYU he received numerous awards for research, including the "Karl G. Maeser Research and Creative Arts Award" in 2015 (one of just two given at the university). At BYU, he taught courses in corpus linguistics, historical linguistics, and English grammar.

== Books ==
- Davies, Mark and Kathy Hayward Davies. 2017. A Frequency Dictionary of Spanish: Core Vocabulary for Learners. Second edition: revised and expanded. Routledge.
- Davies, Mark and Dee Gardner. 2010. A Frequency Dictionary of American English: Word Sketches, Collocates, and Thematic Lists. Routledge.
- Gries, Stefan, Stefanie Wulff, and Mark Davies. 2009. Corpus linguistic applications: current studies, new directions. Rodopi.
- Davies, Mark and Ana Maria Raposo Preto-Bay. 2007. A Frequency Dictionary of Portuguese: Core Vocabulary for Learners. Routledge.
- Davies, Mark. 2005. A Frequency Dictionary of Spanish: Core Vocabulary for Learners. First edition. Routledge.
- Davies, Mark. 2004. El uso del Corpus del Español y otros corpus para investigar la variación actual y los cambios históricos. Tokyo: University of Sophia.

== Other selected publications (since 2005) ==
- Davies, Mark. 2021. "The Coronavirus Corpus: Design, construction, and use". International Journal of Corpus Linguistics. 26(4): 583–98.
- Davies, Mark and Giovanni Parodi. 2021. "Constitución de corpus crecientes del español". In Giovanni Parodi, Pascual Cantos, Chad Howe. The Routledge Handbook of Spanish Corpus Linguistics.
- Kim, Jong-Bok and Mark Davies. 2020. "English what with absolute constructions: a Construction Grammar perspective." English Language and Linguistics 24(4): 637–666.
- Davies, Mark. 2020. "The TV and Movies corpora: design, construction, and use." International Journal of Corpus Linguistics. 26(1): 10–37.
- Davies, Mark and Jong-Bok Kim. 2019. "The advantages and challenges of ‘big data’: Insights from the 14 billion word iWeb corpus". Linguistic Research 36(1), 1-34.
- Davies, Mark. 2019. "The best of both worlds: Multi-billion word ‘dynamic’ corpora". In Piotr Banski, et al. Proceedings of the Workshop on Challenges in the Management of Large Corpora (CMLC-7) 2019. Mannheim: Leibniz-Institut fur Deutsche Sprache.
- Davies, Mark and Jong-Bok Kim. 2019. "Historical shifts with the into-causative construction in American English." Linguistics 57: 29–58.
- Gardner, Dee and Mark Davies. 2018. "Sorting them all out: Exploring the separable phrasal verbs of English." System 76: 197–209.
- Davies, Mark. 2018. "Using (and useful) corpora for the study of the history of English". In Teaching the History of the English Language, eds. Chris Palmer and Colette Moore. MLA Options for Teaching Series.
- Davies, Mark. 2018. "Corpus-based studies of lexical and semantic variation: The importance of both corpus size and corpus design." In From data to evidence in English language research (Digital Linguistics), eds. Suhr, Carla, Terttu Nevalainen and Irma Taavitsainen. Leiden: Brill. 34–55.
- Davies, Mark. 2018. "Uso del Corpus del Español y los corpus relacionados para la lexicografía histórica española." In Historia del léxico español y Humanidades digitales. Eds. Alejandro Fajardo, et al. Berlin: Peter Lang. 49–76.
- Davies, Mark. 2017. "Using Large Online Corpora to Examine Lexical, Semantic, and Cultural Variation in Different Dialects and Time Periods". In Corpus-Based Sociolinguistics, ed. Eric Friginal et al. London: Routledge. 19–82.
- Kim, Jong-Bok and Mark Davies. 2016. "The Into Causative Construction in English: A Construction-based Perspective." English Language and Linguistics 20 (1): 55–83.
- Biber, Douglas, Jesse Egbert, and Mark Davies. 2015. "Exploring the Composition of the Web: A Corpus-based Taxonomy of Web Registers". Corpora 10 (1): 11–45.
- Davies, Mark and Robert Fuchs. 2015. "Expanding Horizons in the Study of World Englishes with the 1.9 Billion Word Global Web-Based English Corpus (GloWbE)." English World-Wide 36: 1-28.
- Davies, Mark. 2014. "Making Google Books n-grams useful for a wide range of research on language change". International Journal of Corpus Linguistics 19 (3): 401–16.
- Davies, Mark. 2014. "Powerful (yet simple) comparisons of a wide range of phenomena in British and American English". ICAME Journal 38:35-56.
- Davies, Mark. 2014. "Creating and Using the Corpus do Português and the Frequency Dictionary of Portuguese". In Working with Portuguese Corpora, eds. Tony Berber Sardinha and Telma Ferreira. Continuum Publishers. 89–110.
- Davies, Mark. 2014. "Examining syntactic variation in English: the importance of corpus design and corpus size". English Language and Linguistics 19 (3): 1-35.
- Gardner, Dee and Mark Davies. 2013. "A New Academic Vocabulary List." In Applied Linguistics 35: 1-24.
- Davies, Mark. 2012. "Expanding Horizons in Historical Linguistics with the 400 million word Corpus of Historical American English". Corpora 7: 121–57.
- Davies, Mark. 2012. "Examining Recent Changes in English: Some Methodological Issues". In The Oxford Handbook of the History of English, eds. Terttu Nevalainen and Elizabeth Closs Traugott. Oxford: Oxford Univ. Press. 263–87.
- Davies, Mark. 2011. "Synchronic and Diachronic Uses of Corpora". In Perspectives on Corpus Linguistics: Connections & Controversies, eds. Vander Viana, Sonia Zyngier and Geoff Barnbrook. Philadelphia: John Benjamins. 63–80.
- Davies, Mark and Dee Gardner. 2011. "Creating and Using the Frequency Dictionary of Contemporary American English: Word Sketches, Collocates, and Thematic Lists". In Corpus-based studies in language use, language learning, and language documentation, ed. John Newman, et al. Amsterdam: Rodopi. 283–97.
- Davies, Mark. 2011. "The Corpus of Contemporary American English as the First Reliable Monitor Corpus of English". Literary and Linguistic Computing 25: 447–65.
- Davies, Mark. 2010. "Creating Useful Historical Corpora: A Comparison of CORDE, the Corpus del Español, and the Corpus do Português". In Diacronía de las lenguas iberorromances: nuevas perspectivas desde la lingüística de corpus, ed. Andrés Enrique-Arias. Frankfurt/Madrid: Vervuert/Iberoamericana. 137–66.
- Davies, Mark. 2009. "The 385+ Million Word Corpus of Contemporary American English (1990-2008+): Design, Architecture, and Linguistic Insights". International Journal of Corpus Linguistics. 14: 159–90.
- Davies, Mark. 2009. "Relational databases as a robust architecture for the analysis of word frequency". In What's in a Wordlist?: In Investigating Word Frequency and Keyword Extraction, ed. Dawn Archer. London: Ashgate. 53–68.
- Davies, Mark. 2008. "Spanish and Portuguese Corpus Linguistics". Studies in Hispanic and Lusophone Linguistics. 1:149-86.
- Davies, Mark and Dee Gardner. 2007. "Pointing Out Frequent Phrasal Verbs: A Corpus-Based Analysis". TESOL Quarterly 41:339-59.
- Davies, Mark. 2006. "Towards the first comprehensive survey of register variation in Spanish". In Corpus Linguistics Beyond the Word: Corpus Research from Phrase to Discourse, ed. Eileen Fitzpatrick. Rodopi. 73–86.
- Biber, Douglas, Mark Davies, James Jones, and Nicole Tracy-Ventura. 2006. "Spoken and written register variation in Spanish: A Multi-dimensional Analysis." Corpora 1:1-37.
- Davies, Mark. 2005. "The advantage of using relational databases for large corpora: speed, advanced queries, and unlimited annotation". International Journal of Corpus Linguistics 10: 301–28.
