= Longest word in French =

List of the longest words in french

This article lists some of the longest words in the French language.

As in many languages, chemical nomenclature may be used to construct indefinitely long chemical names (if referring to fictional molecules), and therefore is not on this list. The chemical name of titin could be translated, and therefore would be the longest technical word in the French language.

The longest word listed below, hippopotomonstrosesquippedaliophobique (38 letters) means, ironically, "suffering from the fear (or phobia) of long words". The word is formed from the Latin word sesquipedalia (singular sesquipedalis), which the Ancient Roman poet Horace used in Ars Poetica to describe excessively long words; literally, it means "a foot-and-a-half long".

Like the other adejctives in the list, hippopotomonstrosesquippedaliophobique can be pluralised by adding the letter s to the end. The adjective interdépartemental (18 letters), which also appears in the list, can be made longer by appending the letters es, which gives its plural, grammatically gendered form.

== Long words ==
Word	Letters	Syllables	Part of speech	Translation	Ref.
hippopotomonstrosesquippedaliophobique	38	13	Adjective	hippopotomonstrosesquipedaliophobic	
dichlorodiphényltrichloroéthane	31	11	Noun	dichlorodiphenyltrichloroethane (DDT)	
hexakosioihexekontahexaphobie	29	13	Noun	hexakosioihexekontahexaphobia	
intergouvernementalisation	26	10	Noun	intergovernmentalisation	
anticonstitutionnellement	25	9	Adverb	anticonstitutionally	
apopathodiaphulatophobie	24	10	Noun	apopathodiaphulatophobia	
désinstitutionnalisation	24	9	Noun	deinstitutionalization	
autocheirothanatophobie	23	9	Noun	autocheirothanatophobia	
paraskevidékatriaphobie	23	10	Noun	paraskavedekatriaphobia	
dyspondéromorphophobie	22	8	Noun	dysponderomorphophobia	
magnétoplasmadynamique	22	9	Adjective	Magnetoplasmadynamic	
interdépartemental	18	7	Adjective	interdepartmental	
triskaïdekaphobie	17	6	Noun	triskaidekaphobia	

== See also ==
- Longest words
- Longest word in English
- Longest word in Romanian
- Longest word in Spanish
- Longest word in Turkish
