= Spanish Champs =

Spanish Champs is a multimedia preschool and kindergarten Spanish curriculum consisting of song CDs, karaoke CDs, video DVDs, storybooks, song Books, a coloring book, and a teacher's guide. Spanish Champs was initially released in 2005 as a song CD and a video DVD, and the complete curriculum was released in 2009.

== Description ==
Spanish Champs teaches children Spanish through structured play situations, including singing, stories, skits, video, karaoke, games, contests and activities.

Spanish Champs was created by Progressive Language. The videos feature actress Aline Casanova, a native of Mexico. Spanish Champs song CDs were created at Eagle Rock Studios in Albuquerque, New Mexico. All the songs were arranged and produced by Roger Baker.

== Themes covered ==
Level 1: greetings, introductions, colors, numbers, clothes, food, body, manners, feelings. Key verbs: to be, to want, to like, to have.

Level 2: more colors, more numbers, animals, family, action verbs and commands, adjectives and descriptions.

== Pedagocial principles ==
Children pass through several phases as they acquire a language: gathering, key word, and sentence. In the gathering phase, when children are exposed to the new language they start to hear and distinguish sounds. In the key word phase they start to identify and use key content words. For example, to express "I am hungry", they would simply use the key word "hungry". In the sentence phase, children begin to use phrases and complete sentences. There is a long delay from starting to distinguish sounds to being able to use complete sentences.

The Spanish Champs curriculum includes resources to enable each phase this natural learning cycle. Spanish Champs uses a combination of songs, karaoke, video skits, games, contests, stories and activities to teach Spanish.
