= Infoling =

Email list for Spanish-language linguistics

Infoling is a moderated email list for announcements and information related to Spanish-language linguistics. Its range includes topics like native languages of the Americas and teaching Spanish as a second language. There are over 12,000 members in 53 countries who receive updates via e-mail or social media. The website also features a searchable database of many thousands of books, articles, and dissertation announcements and reviews.
