= Homograph =

Distinct words with identical written forms

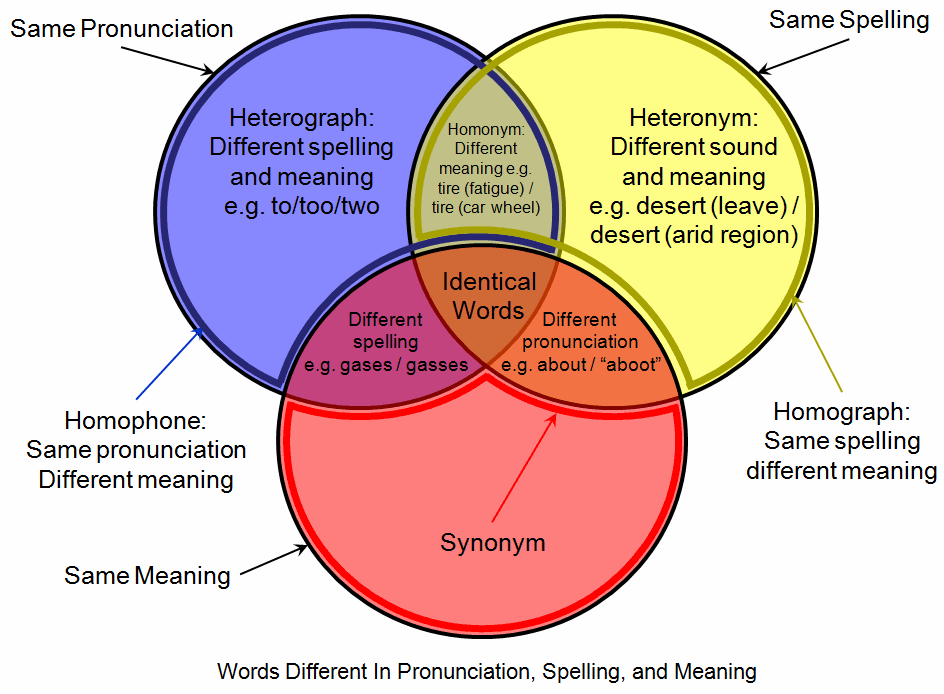
Venn diagram showing the relationships between homographs (yellow) and related linguistic concepts

A homograph (from the Greek: ὁμός, homós 'same' and γράφω, gráphō 'write') is a word that shares the same written form as another word but has a different meaning. However, some dictionaries insist that the words must also be pronounced differently, while the Oxford English Dictionary says that the words should also be of "different origin". In this vein, The Oxford Guide to Practical Lexicography lists various types of homographs, including those in which the words are discriminated by being in a different word class, such as hit, the verb to strike, and hit, the noun a strike.

If, when spoken, the meanings may be distinguished by different pronunciations, the words are also heteronyms. Words with the same writing and pronunciation (i.e. are both homographs and homophones) are considered homonyms. However, in a broader sense the term "homonym" may be applied to words with the same writing or pronunciation. Homograph disambiguation is critically important in speech synthesis, natural language processing and other fields. Identically written different senses of what is judged to be fundamentally the same word are called polysemes; for example, wood (substance) and wood (area covered with trees).

== In English ==
Examples:

- sow (verb) /soʊ/ – to plant seed

sow (noun) /saʊ/ – female pig

where the words are heteronyms, spelt identically but pronounced differently. Here confusion is not possible in spoken language but could occur in written language.

- bear (verb) – to support or carry

bear (noun) – the animal

where the words are homonyms, identical in spelling and pronunciation (/bɛər/), but different in meaning and grammatical function.

The above examples are of etymologically unrelated words. Some homographs are also etymological doublets, meaning they come from the same source and are spelt the same way in Modern English, but their distinct meanings are tied to their distinct pronunciations:

- Dominican /dəˈmɪnɪkən/ – of the Dominican Order or the Dominican Republic (fully anglicized, based on the Latin pronunciation of Dominicus [dɔˈmɪnɪkʊs], named for Saint Dominic)

Dominican /ˌdɒmɪˈniːkən/ – of Dominica (slightly modified from the Spanish pronunciation of Dominica [ðomiˈnika], named for Latin diēs Dominica [ˈdjjɛːs dɔˈmɪnɪka] meaning "the Lord's Day" or "Sunday")

Both words ultimately come from Latin dominicus [dɔˈmɪnɪkʊs] meaning "of the Lord."

- violist /ˈvaɪəlɪst/ – viol player

violist /viˈoʊlɪst/ – viola player

Both viol and viola come from Latin vitula.

=== More examples ===
Word	Example of first meaning	Example of second meaning
lead	Gold is denser than lead /lɛd/.	The mother duck will lead /liːd/ her ducklings around.
close	"Will you please close /kloʊz/ that door!"	The tiger was now so close /kloʊs/ that I could smell it...
wind	The wind /wɪnd/ howled through the woodlands.	Wind /waɪnd/ your watch.
minute	I will be there in a minute /ˈmɪnɪt/.	That is a very minute /maɪˈnuːt///maɪˈnjuːt/ amount.

== In Chinese ==
Many Chinese varieties have homographs, called 多音字 (pinyin: duōyīnzì) or 重形字 (pinyin: chóngxíngzì), 破音字 (pinyin: pòyīnzì).

=== Old Chinese ===
Modern study of Old Chinese has found patterns that suggest a system of affixes. One pattern is the addition of the prefix /*ɦ/, which turns transitive verbs into intransitive or passives in some cases:

Word	Pronunciation_{a}	Meaning_{a}	Pronunciation_{b}	Meaning_{b}
見	*kens	see	*ɦkens	appear
敗	*prats	defeat	*ɦprats	be defeated
All data from Baxter, 1992.

Another pattern is the use of a /*s/ suffix, which seems to create nouns from verbs or verbs from nouns:

Word	Pronunciation_{a}	Meaning_{a}	Pronunciation_{b}	Meaning_{b}
傳	*dron	transmit	*drons	(n.) record
磨	*maj	grind	*majs	grindstone
塞	*sɨk	(v.) block	*sɨks	border, frontier
衣	*ʔjɨj	clothing	*ʔjɨjs	wear, clothe
王	*wjaŋ	king	*wjaŋs	be king
All data from Baxter, 1992.

=== Middle Chinese ===
Many homographs in Old Chinese also exist in Middle Chinese. Examples of homographs in Middle Chinese are:

Word	Pronunciation_{a}	Meaning_{a}	Pronunciation_{b}	Meaning_{b}
易	/jĭe꜄/	easy	/jĭɛk꜆/	(v.) change
別	/bĭɛt꜆/	(v.) part	/pĭɛt꜆/	differentiate, other
上	/꜂ʑĭaŋ/	rise, give	/ʑĭaŋ꜄/	above, top, emperor
長	/꜀dʲʱĭaŋ/	long	/꜂tʲĭaŋ/	lengthen, elder
Reconstructed phonology from Wang Li on the tables in the article Middle Chinese. Tone names in terms of level (꜀平), rising (꜂上), departing (去꜄), and entering (入꜆) are given. All meanings and their respective pronunciations from Wang et al., 2000.

=== Modern Chinese ===
Many homographs in Old Chinese and Middle Chinese also exist in modern Chinese varieties. Homographs which did not exist in Old Chinese or Middle Chinese often come into existence due to differences between literary and colloquial readings of Chinese characters. Other homographs may have been created due to merging two different characters into the same glyph during script reform (See Simplified Chinese characters and Shinjitai).

Some examples of homographs in Cantonese from Middle Chinese are:

Word	Pronunciation_{a}	Meaning_{a}	Pronunciation_{b}	Meaning_{b}
易	[jiː˨]	easy	[jɪk˨]	(v.) change
上	[ɕœːŋ˩˧]	rise, give	[ɕœːŋ˨]	above, top, emperor
長	[tɕʰœːŋ˨˩]	long	[tɕœːŋ˧˥]	lengthen, elder

== See also ==
- Colexification – Multi-meaning encoding in words, comprising vagueness, polysemy, and homonymy
- False friend – Words in two languages that sound similar but have very different meanings
- Homoglyph – Different glyphs which are visually similar
- Homonym – Words spelled or pronounced the same with different meanings
- IDN homograph attack – Visually similar letters in domain names
- Interlingual homograph – Word with different meaning in different languages
- Syncretism (linguistics) – Relation between words with different morphosyntactic features but identical form
- Synonym – Words or phrases of the same meaning

== Bibliography ==
- Drury, Donald A. (1969). "Homographs and Pseudo-Homographs". Word Ways. 2 (3): 146–154.
- Ryan, William M. (1968). "Affixes and the Making of Homographs and Homonyms". American Speech. 43 (2): 138–141. doi:10.2307/454547. ISSN 0003-1283.
